= George W. Hartman =

American football coach (1867–1954)

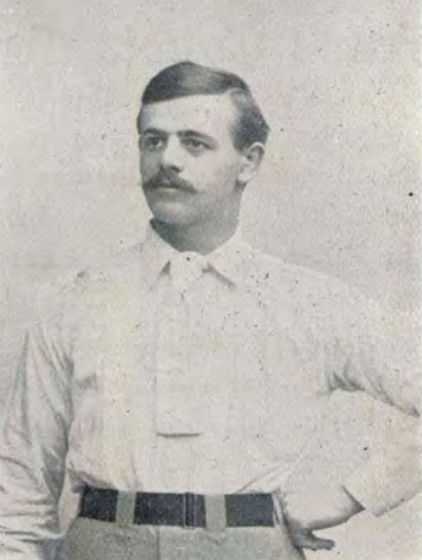
- Hartman pictured in The Oriflamme (1897), Franklin & Marshall College yearbook

Biographical details
- Born: October 5, 1867; Leinbachs, Pennsylvania, U.S.
- Died: April 9, 1954 (aged 86); Jesup, Georgia, U.S.

Playing career
- 1892–1894: Franklin & Marshall
- Position: Left tackle

Coaching career (HC unless noted)
- 1894: Franklin & Marshall

Head coaching record
- Overall: 6–4

George Washington Hartman (October 5, 1867 – April 9, 1954) was an American college football player and coach, teacher, physical director, and minister of the Reformed Church in America. He served as the captain of Franklin & Marshall College in Lancaster, Pennsylvania in 1894, during a period of time when the captain also served as the team's head coach. Hartman led Franklin & Marshall to record of a 6–4 during the 1894 season.

Hartman was born on October 5, 1867, in Leinbachs, Pennsylvania, to George C. and Rebecca Leinbach Hartman. He grew up on his father's farm before attending Keystone State Normal School—now known as Kutztown University of Pennsylvania—from 1884 to 1886. He taught from 1885 to 1887, and then spent four years as a traveling salesman. Hartman returned to teaching at Leesport, Pennsylvania during the winter of 1890–91. He entered Franklin & Marshall in 1891 with the class of 1895. Hartman graduated from Franklin & Marshall in 1895 with a Bachelor of Arts degree.

In 1901, Hartman was the pastor of the Reformed Church of Orwigsburg, Pennsylvania. On May 29, 1901, he married Carrie Maud Reed at the home of her parents, in Doylestown, Pennsylvania. In 1918, Hartman served in the American Expeditionary Forces (AEF) during World War I. He was the brother of United States Army officer John Daniel Leinbach Hartman.

Hartman spent 20 years as the pastor at Wentz's Reformed Church in Worcester, Pennsylvania before retiring in May 1948. He died on April 9, 1954, in Jesup, Georgia, while traveling though the American South with his son, John D. Hartman, a professor at Cornell University.

== Head coaching record ==
Year	Team	Overall	Conference	Standing	Bowl/playoffs
Franklin & Marshall (Independent) (1894)
1894	Franklin & Marshall	6–4			
Franklin & Marshall:		6–4			
Total:		6–4			
