= Pennsylvania Route 363 =

State highway in Montgomery County, Pennsylvania

Pennsylvania Route 363

Route information
- Maintained by PennDOT
- Length: 11.960 mi (19.248 km)
- Existed: 1928–present

Major junctions
- South end: US 422 in Audubon
- PA 73 in Worcester
- North end: PA 63 in Lansdale

Location
- Country: United States
- State: Pennsylvania
- Counties: Montgomery

Highway system
- Pennsylvania State Route System; Interstate; US; State; Scenic; Legislative
← PA 362	→ PA 364

Pennsylvania Route 363 (PA 363) is a state highway located in Montgomery County, Pennsylvania that is a spur of PA 63. The route, which is signed north-south, runs 11.96 mi (19.25 km) from an interchange with U.S. Route 422 (US 422) in Audubon northeast to an intersection with PA 63 in Lansdale. The route runs mostly through suburban areas of central Montgomery County, passing some farmland in Worcester Township. PA 363 is designated along Trooper Road, Ridge Pike, Park Avenue, and Valley Forge Road. In the community of Worcester, the route crosses PA 73.

PA 363 was first designated by the Pennsylvania Department of Highways in 1928 to run from PA 23 in Port Kennedy to PA 63 in Lansdale. In the 1940s, PA 363 was extended west on present-day PA 23 to end near Valley Forge. The route was extended south from Valley Forge to US 30 in Devon in 1961. In the 1960s, the route was redirected to follow Gulph Road southeast to US 202 in King of Prussia. By 1989, the south end of PA 363 was relocated to the US 422 interchange. The Betzwood Bridge, which had carried PA 363 over the Schuylkill River, was removed in 1995. The partial interchange with US 422 became a full interchange in 2015.

== Route description ==
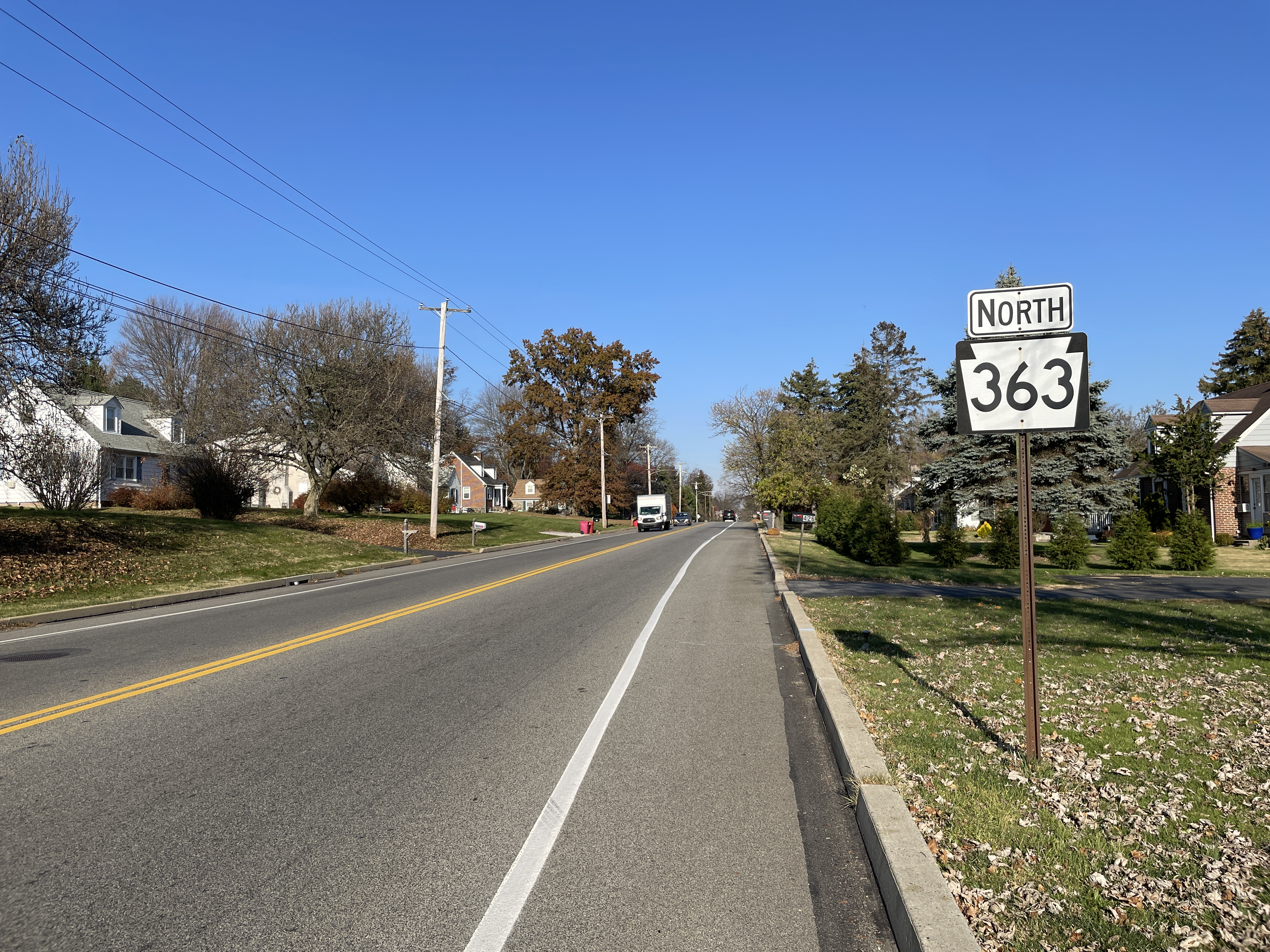
PA 363 northbound past Egypt Road in Audubon

PA 363 begins at a partial cloverleaf interchange with the US 422 freeway (Pottstown Expressway) near Valley Forge National Historical Park in Montgomery County, from where Trooper Road continues south to a dead end at the Schuylkill River. From this point, the route heads northeast on four-lane divided Trooper Road, forming the border between Lower Providence Township to the northwest and West Norriton Township to the southeast as it runs through the community of Audubon. The road passes a business park to the northwest and residential neighborhoods to the southeast as it narrows into an undivided road and enters areas of shopping centers. Here, the route becomes a divided highway again and intersects Egypt Road.

PA 363 continues as a two-lane undivided road past more homes before it reaches the Ridge Pike/West Main Street junction. At this point, the route turns northwest onto Ridge Pike and fully enters Lower Providence Township, passing businesses as a three-lane road with a center left-turn lane. PA 363 turns northeast onto two-lane Park Avenue in the community of Trooper and runs through more residential areas. A short distance after entering Worcester Township, the route comes to the community of Fairview Village and crosses Germantown Pike in a commercial area.

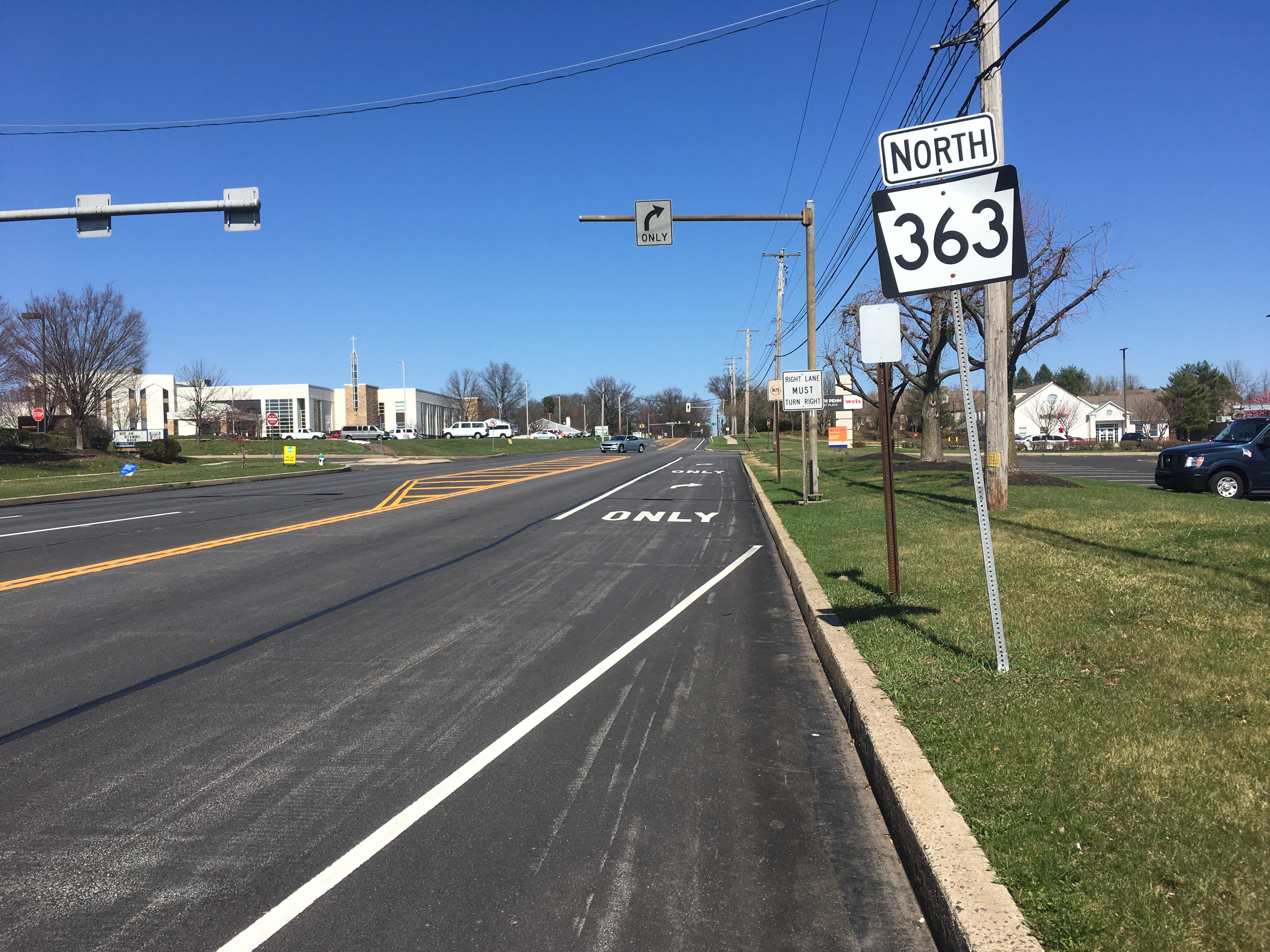
PA 363 northbound past Sumneytown Pike near Lansdale

Upon crossing Germantown Pike, PA 363 becomes known as Valley Forge Road and continues into agricultural areas with scattered residential neighborhoods. The amount of development increases until the road comes to the junction with PA 73 (Skippack Pike) in the community of Worcester. After the PA 73 intersection, PA 363 continues past areas of housing developments to the west and farmland to the east before it reaches Morris Road. At this point, the route enters the North Penn Valley region and becomes the border between Towamencin Township to the northwest and Upper Gwynedd Township to the southeast, crossing under Interstate 476 (Pennsylvania Turnpike Northeast Extension) along this stretch.

The road passes through residential neighborhoods before entering commercial areas and crossing Sumneytown Pike. PA 363 heads to the southeast of North Penn High School and runs past a mix of homes and businesses as it gains a center left-turn lane on the approach to the Allentown Road junction. A short distance later, the route enters the borough of Lansdale and passes homes as a two-lane road. PA 363 reaches its northern terminus at an intersection with PA 63 (West Main Street) in Lansdale, where Valley Forge Road continues north as a local street.

== History ==
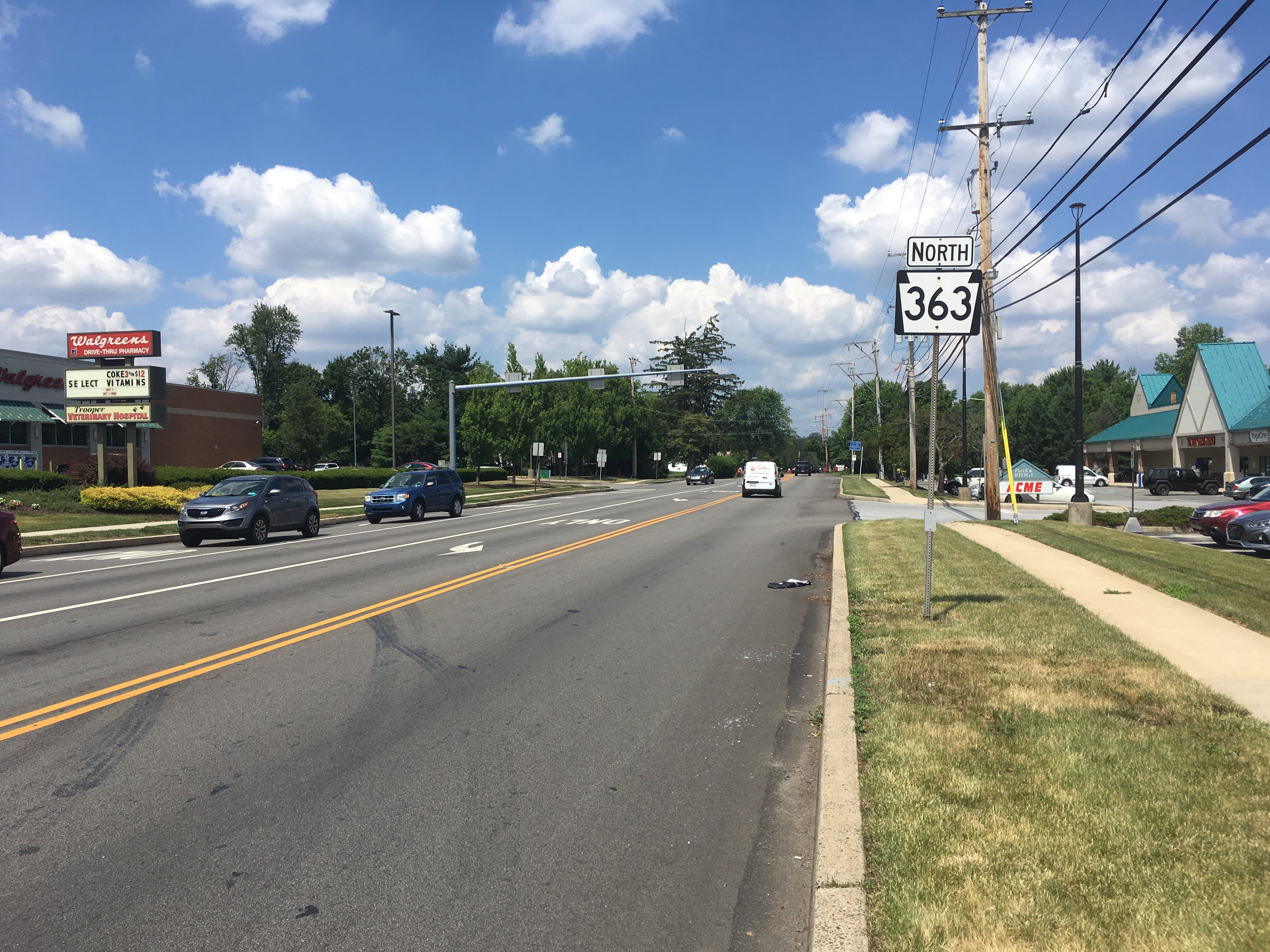
PA 363 northbound past Ridge Pike in Trooper

When Pennsylvania first legislated routes in 1911, present-day PA 363 was not given a number with the exception of the Ridge Pike portion, which was designated as part of Legislative Route 146. In 1928, PA 363 was designated to run between PA 23 in the Port Kennedy section of Upper Merion Township and PA 63 in Lansdale. The route headed north across the Schuylkill River near the present US 422 bridge, before heading north on Trooper Road and east on Egypt Road to an intersection with US 422 (Ridge Pike). PA 363 headed west concurrent with US 422 before heading north on Park Avenue and following its current alignment north to Lansdale. At this time, the route was paved between PA 23 and the north end of the US 422 concurrency. By 1930, PA 363 was rerouted to follow Trooper Road between Egypt Road and US 422. At this time, the entire length of the route was paved.

By 1945, PA 363 was extended west to end at PA 23 a short distance to the east of the community of Valley Forge. This portion of route was cosigned with PA 23 Truck by 1950. In 1961, PA 363 was extended south from Valley Forge to US 30 in Devon along Valley Creek Road, Valley Forge Road, Devon State Road, and Waterloo Road, replacing the PA 83 designation along this stretch of road. PA 363 was rerouted to follow Gulph Road from Port Kennedy to US 202 in King of Prussia, with PA 23 being rerouted to follow the former PA 363 between Valley Forge and Port Kennedy, by 1967. Also by this time, the US 422 concurrency on Ridge Pike had been removed and a freeway had been built that connected PA 363 a short distance north of the Schuylkill River to the US 202 freeway on the border of Chester and Montgomery counties. By 1970, a portion of the former alignment of PA 363 along Valley Forge Road and Valley Creek Road south of Valley Forge became part of PA 252.

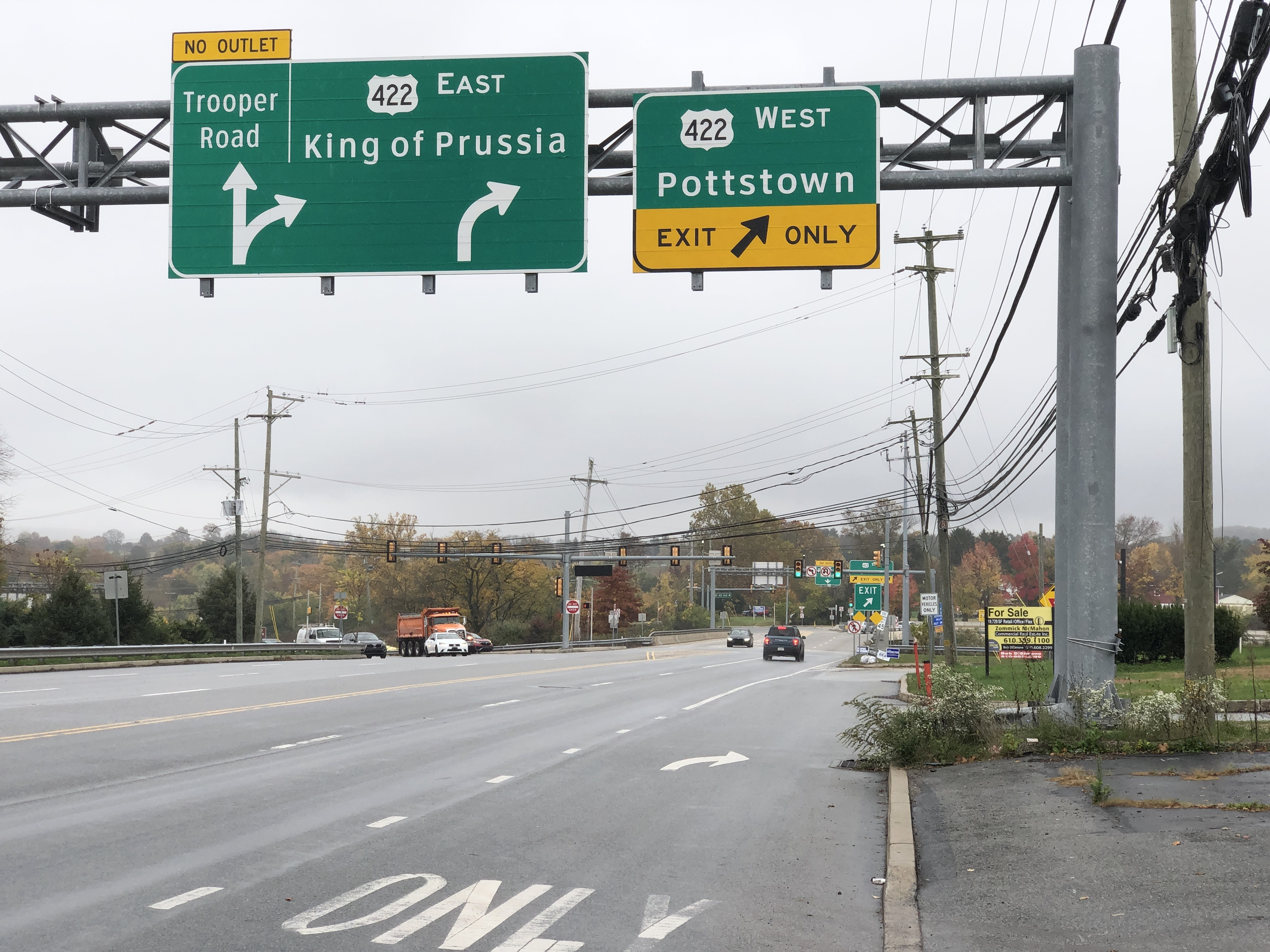
Southern terminus of PA 363 at US 422 along the Lower Providence Township/West Norriton Township border

By 1989, the southern terminus of PA 363 was cut back to its current location at the US 422 interchange. In 1991, the Betzwood Bridge, which formerly carried PA 363 over the Schuylkill River, was closed because of structural issues. The bridge was removed in 1995 and limited bicycle and pedestrian access to Valley Forge National Historical Park from the north, with a temporary bike path being erected on the parallel US 422 bridge. There were plans to replace the Betzwood Bridge with a structure carrying two vehicle traffic lanes and a multi-use trail; these plans never advanced. Ultimately, the National Park Service secured federal funding for a mixed-use trail bridge to connect the trails in the north and south sides of Valley Forge National Historical Park at the site of the old bridge. Named Sullivan's Bridge after Revolutionary War General John Sullivan, construction began on the new bridge in May 2014 and it opened August 19, 2016, for pedestrian and bicycle traffic. In 2013, work on improvements to the interchange between PA 363 and US 422 started, which added a ramp from PA 363 to westbound US 422 and from eastbound US 422 to PA 363. The new ramps opened to traffic on December 1, 2015.

== Major intersections ==
The entire route is in Montgomery County.

Location	mi	km	Destinations	Notes
Lower Providence–West Norriton township line	0.000	0.000	Trooper Road south	Continuation south
Lower Providence–West Norriton township line	0.000	0.000	US 422 – King of Prussia, Pottstown	Interchange
Worcester Township	7.675	12.352	PA 73 (Skippack Pike) – Skippack, Center Square	
Lansdale	11.960	19.248	PA 63 (Main Street) – Hatfield, Sellersville	Northern terminus
1.000 mi = 1.609 km; 1.000 km = 0.621 mi
