= Mike Wilson (American football/baseball) =

American football and baseball player (1896–1978)

- Catcher
- Born: December 2, 1896; Edge Hill, Pennsylvania, U.S.
- Died: May 16, 1978 (aged 81); Boynton Beach, Florida, U.S.
- Batted: Right Threw: Right

MLB debut
- June 4, 1921, for the Pittsburgh Pirates

Last MLB appearance
- September 5, 1921, for the Pittsburgh Pirates

MLB statistics
- Batting average: .000
- Games played: 5
- At bats: 4
- Stats at Baseball Reference

Teams
- Pittsburgh Pirates (1921); Football career

Profile
- Positions: End, guard, quarterback

Personal information
- Listed height: 5 ft 10 in (1.78 m)
- Listed weight: 167 lb (76 kg)

Career information
- High school: Northeast (PA)
- College: Lehigh

Career history
- Buffalo All-Americans (1922); Rochester Jeffersons (1922); Rock Island Independents (1923–1924, 1926)

Awards and highlights
- Collyers Eye Mag.: 1st Team All-NFL (1924)

Career statistics
- Games: 17
- Stats at Pro Football Reference

Samuel Marshall "Mike" Wilson (December 2, 1896 – May 16, 1978) was an American professional football and baseball player. He played four seasons in the National Football League (NFL) and the first American Football League between 1922 and 1926, and part of one Major League Baseball season in 1921.

== Football ==
A native of Edge Hill, Pennsylvania, he played college football for Lehigh and professional football in the NFL as an end and back. He appeared in 17 NFL games, 16 as a starter. In 1922 Wilson was an end with the NFL's Buffalo All-Americans however he finished the season with the Rochester Jeffersons. In 1923, he played for the Rock Island Independents. While Wilson took a break from football in 1925, he was a played once again in 1926 with the Independents, which were now playing in the AFL.

== Baseball ==
Wilson played five games as a catcher for the Pittsburgh Pirates in 1921, going hitless in four at bats. He continued to play in the minors until 1928 before retiring.

== Sources ==
- Career statistics from Baseball Reference · Baseball Reference (Minors) · Retrosheet · Baseball Almanac
- "Buffalo's Two Sports Guys" (PDF). PFRA Annual. 19 (4). Professional Football Researchers Association: 1–5. 1997. Archived from the original (PDF) on October 6, 2010.
