= Pennsylvania Route 73 =

State highway in Pennsylvania, US

Pennsylvania Route 73
- PA 73 in red and PA 73 Truck in blue

Route information
- Maintained by PennDOT
- Length: 62.319 mi (100.293 km)
- Existed: 1928–present

Major junctions
- West end: PA 61 near Leesport
- US 222 in Maiden Creek; PA 12 in Breezy Corner; PA 100 in Gilbertsville; PA 29 in Schwenksville; US 202 in Center Square; PA 309 in Springfield Township; PA 611 near Jenkintown; US 1 in Philadelphia; US 13 in Philadelphia; I-95 in Philadelphia
- East end: Route 73 at the New Jersey state line in Palmyra, NJ

Location
- Country: United States
- State: Pennsylvania
- Counties: Berks, Montgomery, Philadelphia

Highway system
- Pennsylvania State Route System; Interstate; US; State; Scenic; Legislative
← PA 72	→ PA 74

Pennsylvania Route 73 (PA 73) is a 62.32-mile (100.29 km) long east–west state highway in southeastern Pennsylvania. It runs from PA 61 near Leesport southeast to the New Jersey state line on the Tacony–Palmyra Bridge over the Delaware River in Philadelphia, where the road continues south as New Jersey Route 73. The route passes through rural areas of Berks County, crossing U.S. Route 222 (US 222) in Maiden Creek before heading southeast through Oley and Boyertown. PA 73 continues into Montgomery County and intersects PA 100 in Gilbertsville and PA 29 in Schwenksville before it heads into the northwest suburbs of Philadelphia. The route passes through Skippack and intersects US 202 in Center Square, PA 309 in Springfield Township, and PA 611 near Jenkintown. PA 73 continues through Northeast Philadelphia on Cottman Avenue, crossing US 1 (Roosevelt Boulevard) and US 13 (Frankford Avenue) before coming to an interchange with Interstate 95 (I-95) near the Tacony–Palmyra Bridge.

Predating the Interstate and U.S. Highway Systems, the Skippack Pike, a modern section of the route, served as the primary connector between Philadelphia and the northwest suburbs. The Skippack Pike dates back to 1713 and was completed as a turnpike in 1855. Legislative Route 197 connected Reading to Philadelphia along the PA 73 corridor in 1911. PA 73 was designated in 1928 to run from PA 23 near Blue Ball east to US 1 in Philadelphia, heading north to Reading and northeast to Oley before heading southeast to Philadelphia. The route was extended east to the Tacony–Palmyra Bridge after it opened in 1929. The portion of route between Leesport and Maiden Creek became the eastern part of PA 383 by 1930. PA 73 was shifted to its current alignment in eastern Montgomery County in the 1950s. The western terminus of PA 73 was realigned to Leesport by 1966; the former route between Blue Ball and Reading became PA 625 while most of the remainder between Reading and Oley is now unnumbered. PA 73 was shifted to its current routing to the Tacony–Palmyra Bridge in the 1960s, having previously followed Frankford Avenue and Robbins and Levick streets on a one-way pair.

== Route description ==
=== Berks County ===
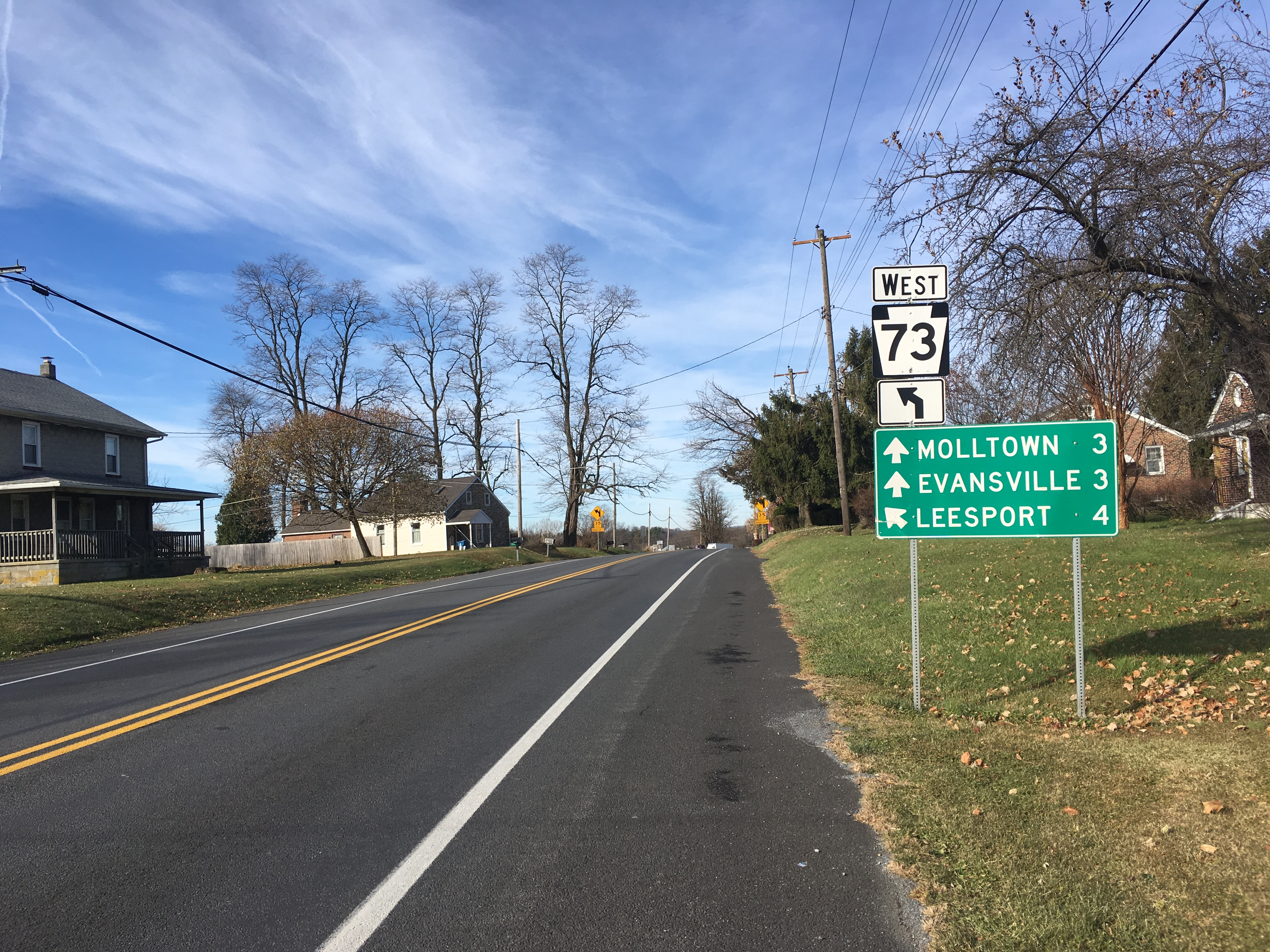
PA 73 westbound in Maidencreek Township

PA 73 begins at an intersection with PA 61 in Ontelaunee Township, Berks County, to the north of the city of Reading and to the southeast of the borough of Leesport. From this intersection, the route heads northeast on two-lane undivided Lake Shore Drive past a mix of farm fields and development, passing south of Schuylkill Valley High School. The road continues east into wooded areas and runs along the south shore of Lake Ontelaunee, where it crosses Maiden Creek at the dam that forms the lake. Past the lake, PA 73 enters Maidencreek Township and comes to a bridge over Norfolk Southern's Evansville Industrial Track railroad line as it runs through agricultural areas with some homes. The route heads east-southeast and intersects US 222 in the community of Maiden Creek. PA 73 continues along Main Street and runs through residential areas in the community of Blandon, where it crosses Norfolk Southern's Reading Line at-grade. Past Blandon, the road curves south into forested areas in the South Mountain range and enters Ruscombmanor Township as Blandon Road. The route turns southeast through wooded areas with some residential and commercial development and intersects PA 12 in Breezy Corner. PA 73 continues east through rural land in the Oley Valley region, where it reaches a roundabout with PA 662.

At this point, PA 662 joins PA 73 for a concurrency, and the two routes follow Memorial Highway into Oley Township. The road heads through farms and woods before running past a few businesses in the community of Oley, bypassing the residential center of the community to the southwest. At the east end of Oley, PA 662 splits to the southeast at a roundabout and PA 73 continues east on West Philadelphia Avenue past residential development. The route heads into a mix of farmland and woodland with some homes, crossing the Manatawny Creek before curving southeast and passing through the community of Pleasantville. The road leaves the Oley Valley region and enters Earl Township, running through forested areas with some fields and residences and passing through Shanesville. Past this, the route crosses Ironstone Creek twice and begins to run parallel to the creek, which is located southwest of the road. PA 73 heads east and crosses into Colebrookdale Township, where it makes a turn to the south. The route runs through more rural areas with some homes and curves southeast near Gablesville. The road continues east into the borough of Boyertown, where it splits from Ironstone Creek, and becomes lined with homes. PA 73 heads southeast into the commercial downtown and intersects the eastern terminus of PA 562 at Reading Avenue, at which point it becomes East Philadelphia Avenue. The route crosses the Colebrookdale branch operated by the Colebrookdale Railroad at-grade north of the Boyertown station and continues past more residences in the eastern part of Boyertown.

=== Montgomery County ===
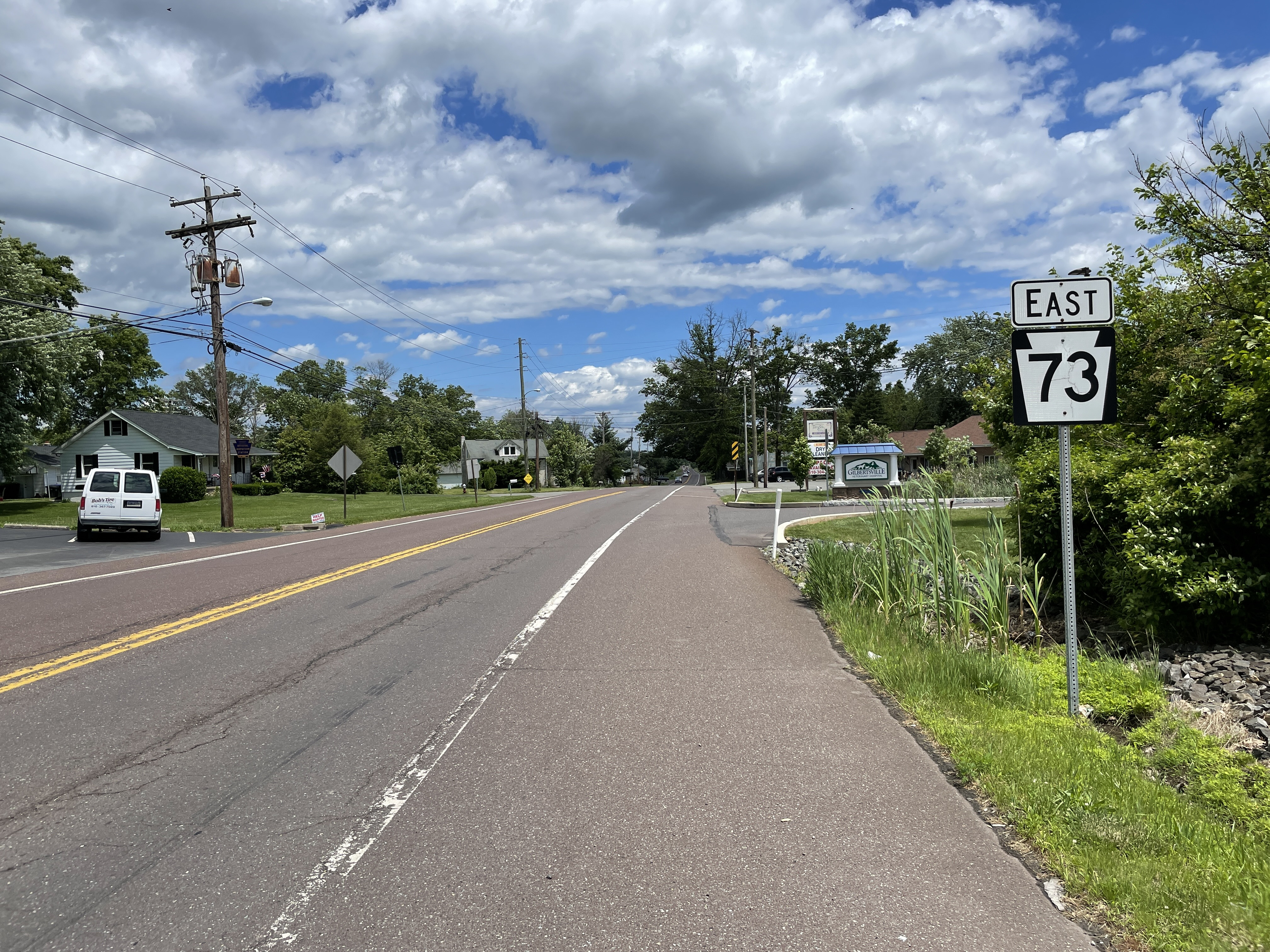
PA 73 eastbound in Gilbertsville

PA 73 crosses into Douglass Township in Montgomery County and continues along East Philadelphia Avenue into commercial areas, widening into a four-lane divided highway as it reaches a diamond interchange with PA 100. Past this interchange, the route becomes a three-lane road with a center left-turn lane and passes a mix of homes and businesses in the community of Gilbertsville. PA 73 narrows to two lanes and continues to an intersection with Swamp Pike and Gilbertsville Road, at which point it turns east to remain along East Philadelphia Avenue and runs past residential subdivisions. The road enters New Hanover Township, where the name becomes Big Road, and passes through a mix of fields and woods with some development. In the community of Layfield, the route intersects PA 663, with that route joining for a short concurrency and the road crossing Swamp Creek before PA 663 splits to the northeast. Following this, PA 73 runs southeast through farmland with some trees and homes, passing through New Hanover Square. The road crosses into Upper Frederick Township, where it heads through rural land with residences and runs through the communities of Frederick and Obelisk. The route continues into Lower Frederick Township and passes through farmland with some development before it reaches a roundabout at PA 29 in the community of Zieglerville. Here, PA 73 turns southeast to join PA 29 on Gravel Pike, running through wooded areas with some homes and crossing Swamp Creek. The road becomes Main Street and heads south on the border between the borough of Schwenksville to the west and Lower Frederick Township to the east, running between wooded neighborhoods to the west and the Perkiomen Creek and Perkiomen Trail to the east. PA 29/PA 73 fully enters Schwenksville and runs past homes and businesses, turning to the southeast.

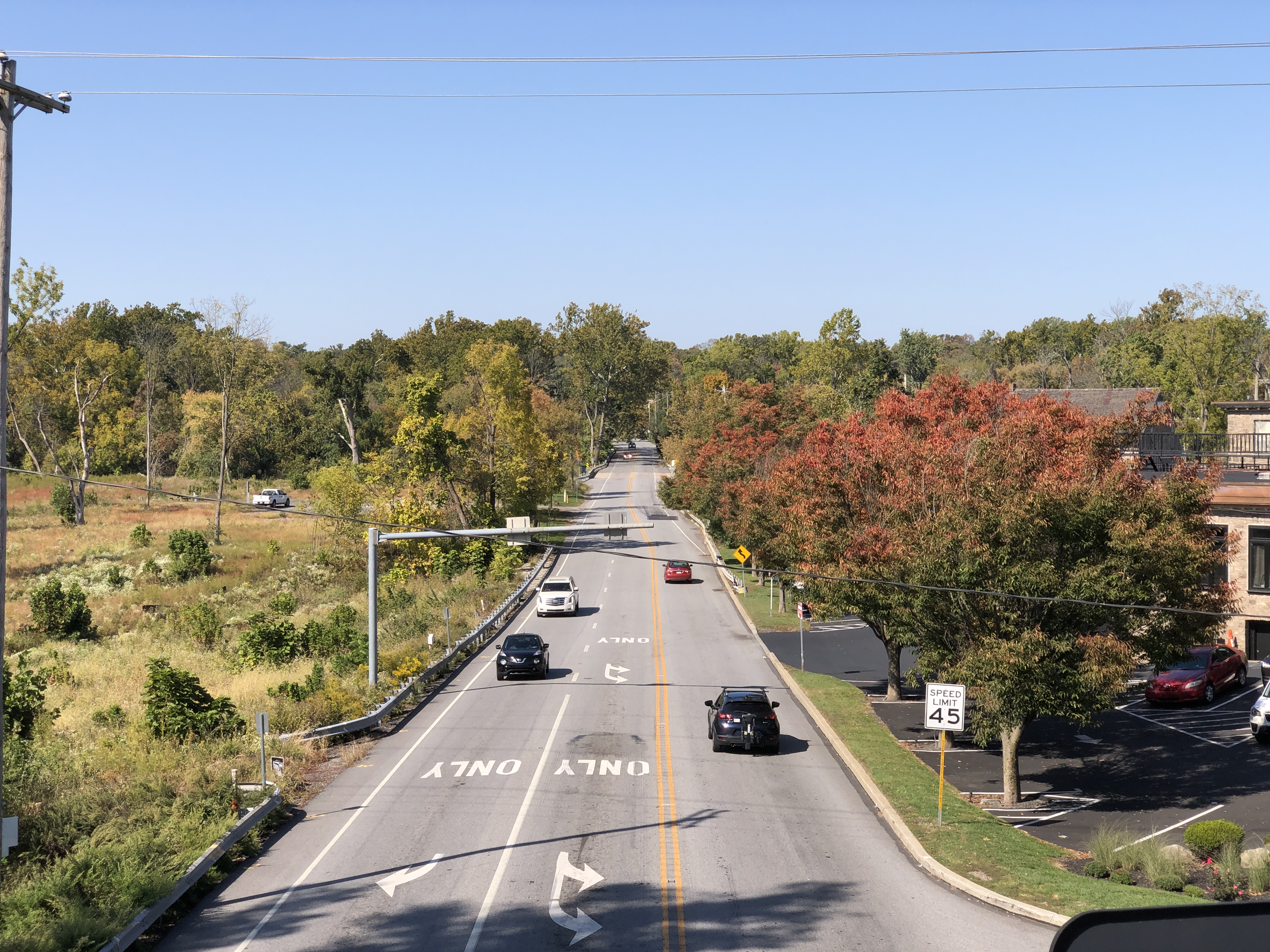
PA 73 westbound along Skippack Pike in Whitemarsh Township

At the south end of the borough, PA 73 splits from PA 29 by turning northeast onto Skippack Pike and immediately crossing the Perkiomen Trail and the Perkiomen Creek into Perkiomen Township. The road turns southeast through wooded areas on the east bank of the creek and crosses the East Branch Perkiomen Creek into Skippack Township. The route curves east away from the Perkiomen Creek and runs through a mix of farmland and woodland with some homes to the north of State Correctional Institution – Phoenix, curving southeast. PA 73 comes to an intersection with PA 113 in a commercial area and continues through the community of Skippack, where it is lined with homes and businesses. The road passes through wooded areas and fields within Evansburg State Park, where it crosses Skippack Creek. The route continues past suburban residential development with some woods and fields as it enters Worcester Township and heads through the community of Cedars before it reaches an intersection with PA 363 in the community of Worcester. Past this intersection, PA 73 runs through a mix of fields, woods, and homes and comes to a bridge under I-476 (Pennsylvania Turnpike Northeast Extension) immediately before it crosses North Wales Road into Whitpain Township in the community of Belfry. The road heads across CSX's Stony Creek Branch railroad line at-grade and passes residential neighborhoods prior to reaching a junction with US 202 in commercial areas in the community of Center Square. The route continues through suburban residential areas with some businesses and runs through Blue Bell. PA 73 heads into Whitemarsh Township at the Butler Pike intersection in the community of Broad Axe and runs through a mix of fields and woods with some homes, passing under the Pennsylvania Turnpike (I-276). The road crosses the Wissahickon Creek in Fort Washington State Park before it comes to Bethlehem Pike in the community of Whitemarsh.

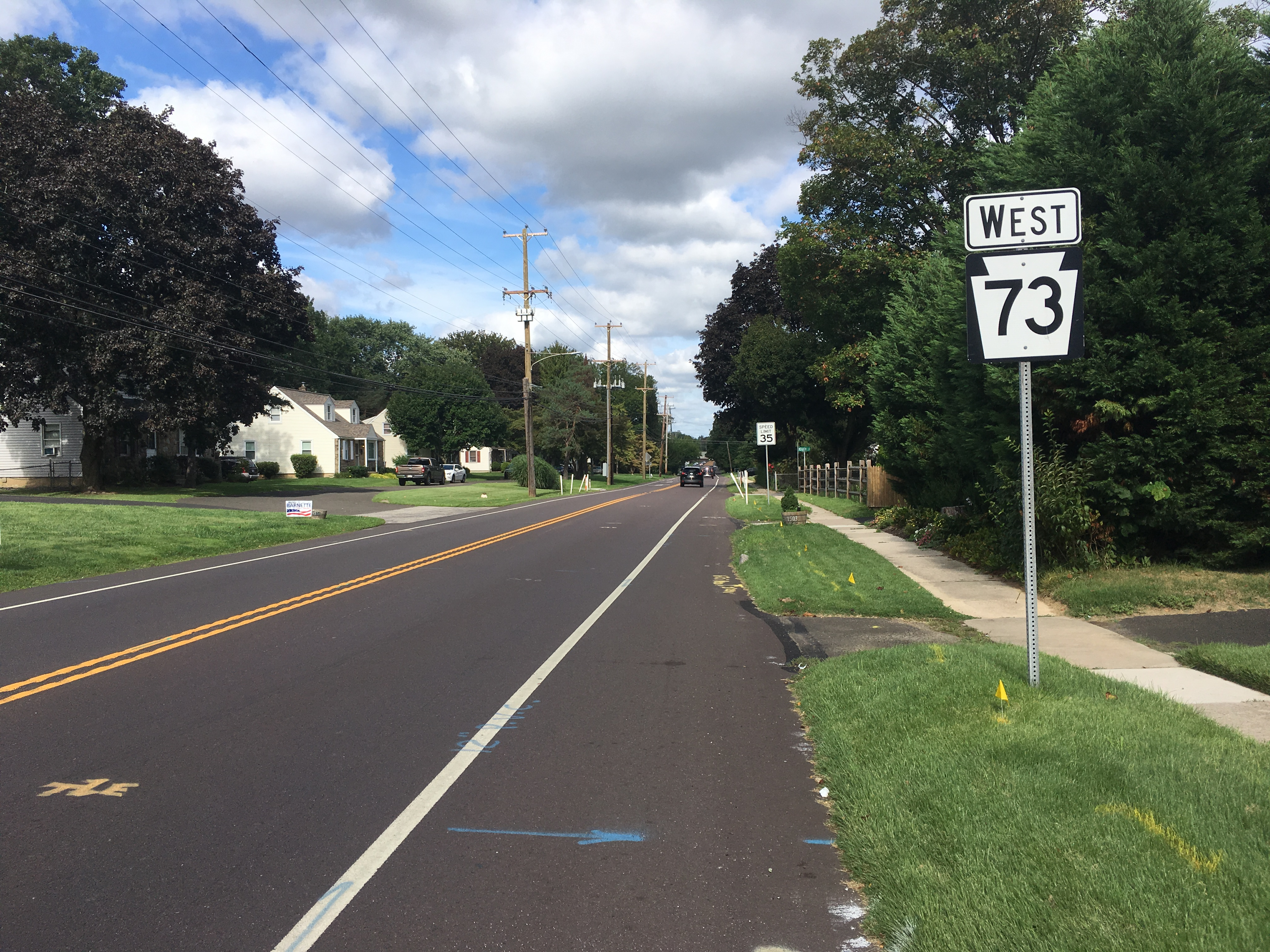
PA 73 westbound in Springfield Township

PA 73 follows Bethlehem Pike south under Norfolk Southern's Morrisville Line and widens to a four-lane road. The route splits from Bethlehem Pike by heading southeast onto two-lane undivided Church Road, passing suburban neighborhoods and entering Springfield Township. The road widens into a divided highway briefly as it has a diamond interchange with the PA 309 freeway. PA 73 continues past homes as a two-lane undivided road and enters Cheltenham Township, where it runs to the northeast of Westminster Theological Seminary and a cemetery. The route crosses the Tacony Creek and passes to the northeast of Arcadia University before it comes to an intersection with PA 152 and crosses under Easton Road near Glenside. The route continues southeast through wooded residential neighborhoods in Wyncote, passing between the Reconstructionist Rabbinical College to the north and Curtis Arboretum to the south before it comes to an intersection with Washington Lane. At this point, PA 73 turns northeast onto four-lane undivided Washington Lane and passes near more homes before coming to a bridge over Chelten Hills Drive, the Tacony Creek, and SEPTA's Main Line. At the southern tip of the borough of Jenkintown, the route turns southeast onto four-lane undivided Township Line Road and forms the border between Abington Township to the northeast and Cheltenham Township to the southwest, passing south of high-rise apartment complexes and heading north of Salus University as it comes to an intersection with PA 611 (Old York Road). The road narrows to two lanes and continues past wooded residential development in Elkins Park. PA 73 fully enters Abington Township and passes some businesses in the community of McKinley before it heads along the township line again and runs near more homes in Elkins Park. The route gains a center left-turn lane and runs past residential and commercial development, passing to the northeast of Jefferson Moss-Magee Rehabilitation Hospital – Elkins Park.

=== Philadelphia County ===
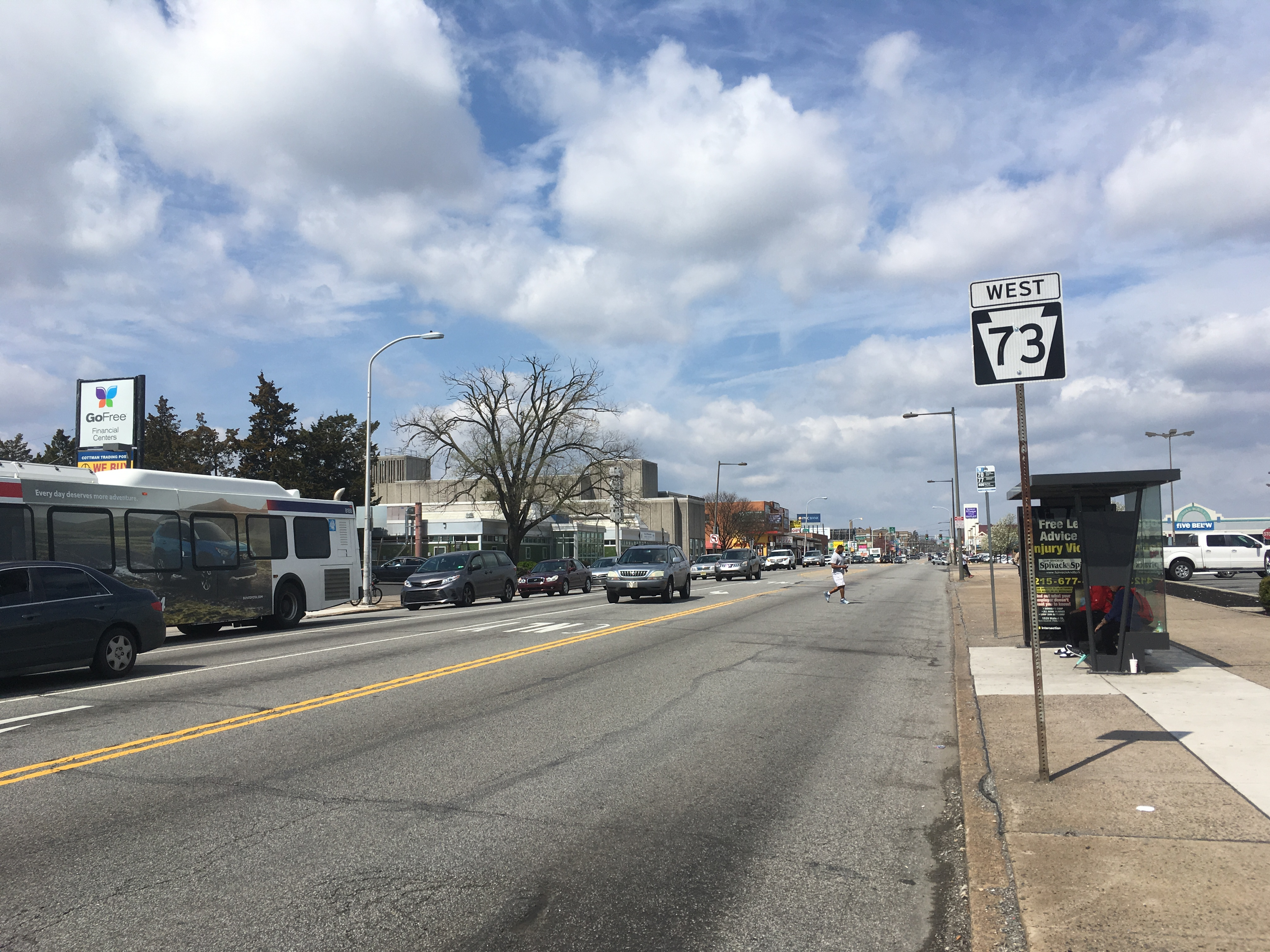
PA 73 (Cottman Avenue) westbound past Bustleton Avenue in Northeast Philadelphia

At the Laurel Avenue intersection, PA 73 becomes Cottman Avenue and turns into a three-lane road with one eastbound lane and two westbound lane that forms the border between the city of Philadelphia in Philadelphia County to the northeast and Cheltenham Township in Montgomery County to the southwest, coming to the entrance to the Fox Chase Cancer Center and Temple University Hospital – Jeanes Campus to the northeast of the road. The route passes between Burholme Park in Philadelphia and homes in Cheltenham Township. The road passes more homes and fully enters Philadelphia upon passing under SEPTA's Fox Chase Line south of the Ryers station in the Ryers neighborhood. PA 73 heads into Northeast Philadelphia and becomes a four-lane road as it runs through commercial areas, reaching a bridge over CSX's Trenton Subdivision railroad line. The route intersects Rising Sun Avenue and PA 232 (Oxford Avenue) at a junction locally known as Five Points. The road heads past a mix of homes and businesses, running between the Burholme neighborhood to the northeast and the Lawncrest neighborhood to the southwest. After crossing Algon Avenue, the route passes to the southwest of Northeast High School. PA 73 gains a center left-turn lane and crosses Castor Avenue near the Rhawnhurst neighborhood. The route continues past several shopping centers and intersects Bustleton Avenue, at which point it passes southwest of Roosevelt Mall. PA 73 comes to an interchange with US 1 (Roosevelt Boulevard), intersecting the local lanes at-grade and passing over the express lanes.

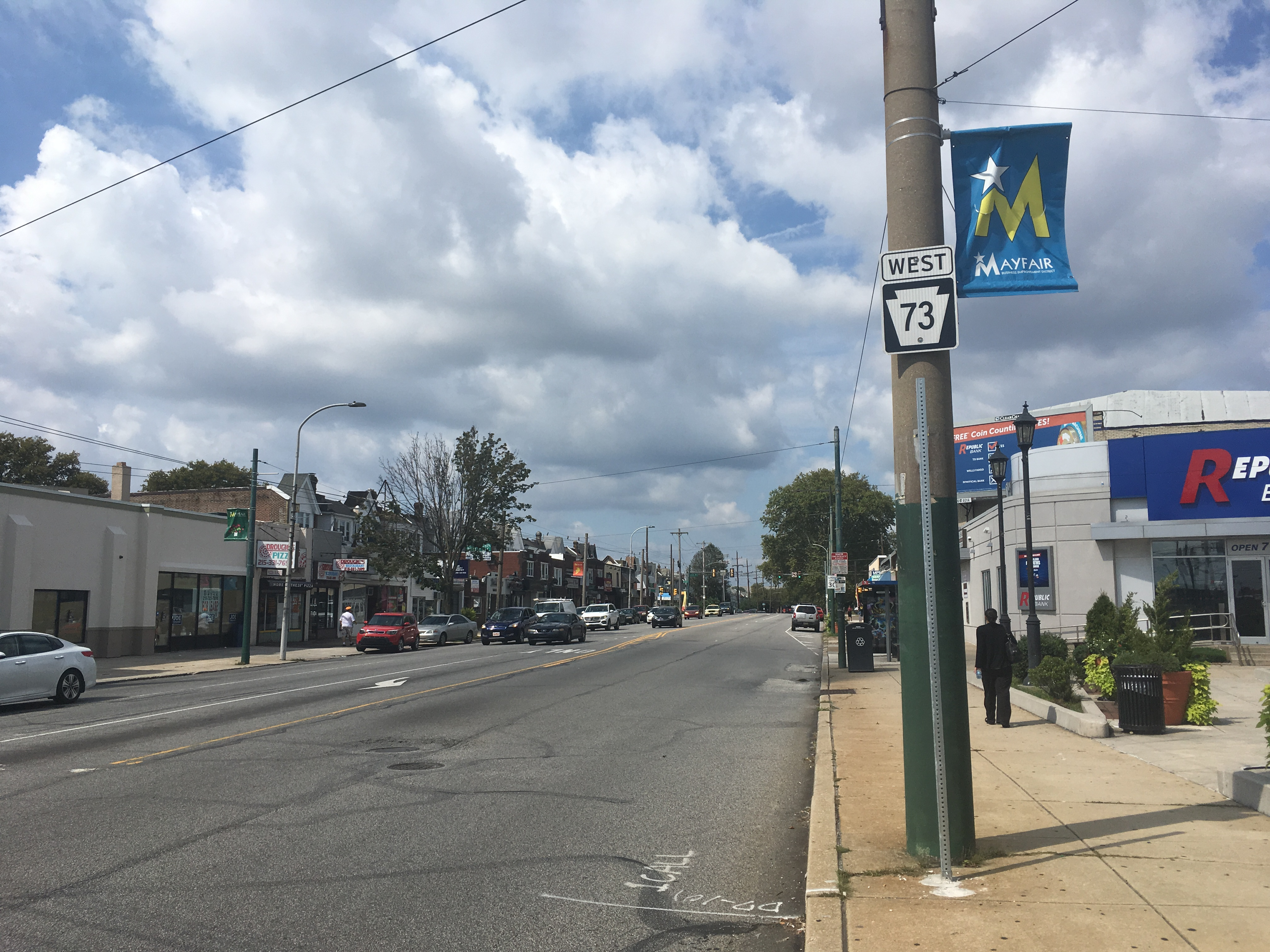
PA 73 (Cottman Avenue) westbound past US 13 (Frankford Avenue) in the Mayfair neighborhood in Northeast Philadelphia

Following this, the road continues into the residential Mayfair neighborhood as a four-lane undivided road. The route enters business areas and comes to an intersection with US 13 (Frankford Avenue). Past this, PA 73 continues southeast past more dense residential areas to the southwest of the Holmesburg neighborhood. The road heads into the Tacony neighborhood and passes more homes and businesses. The route runs to the southwest of St. Hubert Catholic High School for Girls prior to the Torresdale Avenue intersection, where the route narrows to three lanes, with one eastbound lane and two westbound lanes. PA 73 enters industrial areas and crosses under Amtrak's Northeast Corridor railroad line. The route splits from Cottman Avenue by turning southwest onto four-lane undivided State Road. At this intersection, Cottman Avenue has access from a ramp leading from northbound I-95 and from Wissinoming Street, which provides access to Cottman Avenue from a ramp from southbound I-95. PA 73 passes near urban homes and commercial development and comes to a ramp to northbound I-95 at the Princeton Avenue intersection. The route turns south onto New State Road, with State Road continuing southwest to provide access to southbound I-95, and passes under I-95 before it curves southwest to parallel the interstate as a four-lane road through industrial areas. PA 73 reaches an interchange at Levick Street and the approach to the Tacony–Palmyra Bridge, at which point the route heads southeast onto the bridge over the Delaware River. The Tacony–Palmyra Bridge is a combination steel tied-arch bridge and drawbridge with one eastbound lane and two westbound lanes. PA 73 ends on the bridge at the New Jersey state line, at which point Route 73 continues south into the borough of Palmyra, New Jersey.

== History ==
PA 73 (Cottman Avenue) westbound past Castor Avenue in Northeast Philadelphia

The Skippack Pike, a portion of PA 73 between Skippack and Bethlehem Pike in Whitemarsh, dates back to 1713, when settlers in Skippack petitioned Philadelphia officials for a road to their community for purposes of hauling grain to the mill in Whitemarsh. During the American Revolutionary War, George Washington's army suffered a defeat at the Battle of Germantown on October 4, 1777 and had to encamp along the Skippack Pike until October 8. The Americans later marched east on the road while preparing for a counterattack at the Battle of White Marsh. The Skippack Turnpike Company was incorporated in 1845 to construct a turnpike from Whitemarsh to Skippack but the project was abandoned after several efforts. In 1853, a second charter was granted and the turnpike was completed in 1855 near Worcester Township.

When the state began maintenance over roads via the Sproul Road Bill that was signed on May 31, 1911, the system did not include the direct Reading–Philadelphia routes that PA 73 and US 422 are today. PA 73 was adopted as Legislative Route 197, the main route that connected Philadelphia and its northwest suburbs. Legislative Routes paved the way for Pennsylvania's first Traffic Routes in 1924 and a new set of routes, including PA 73, that were added in the late 1920s.

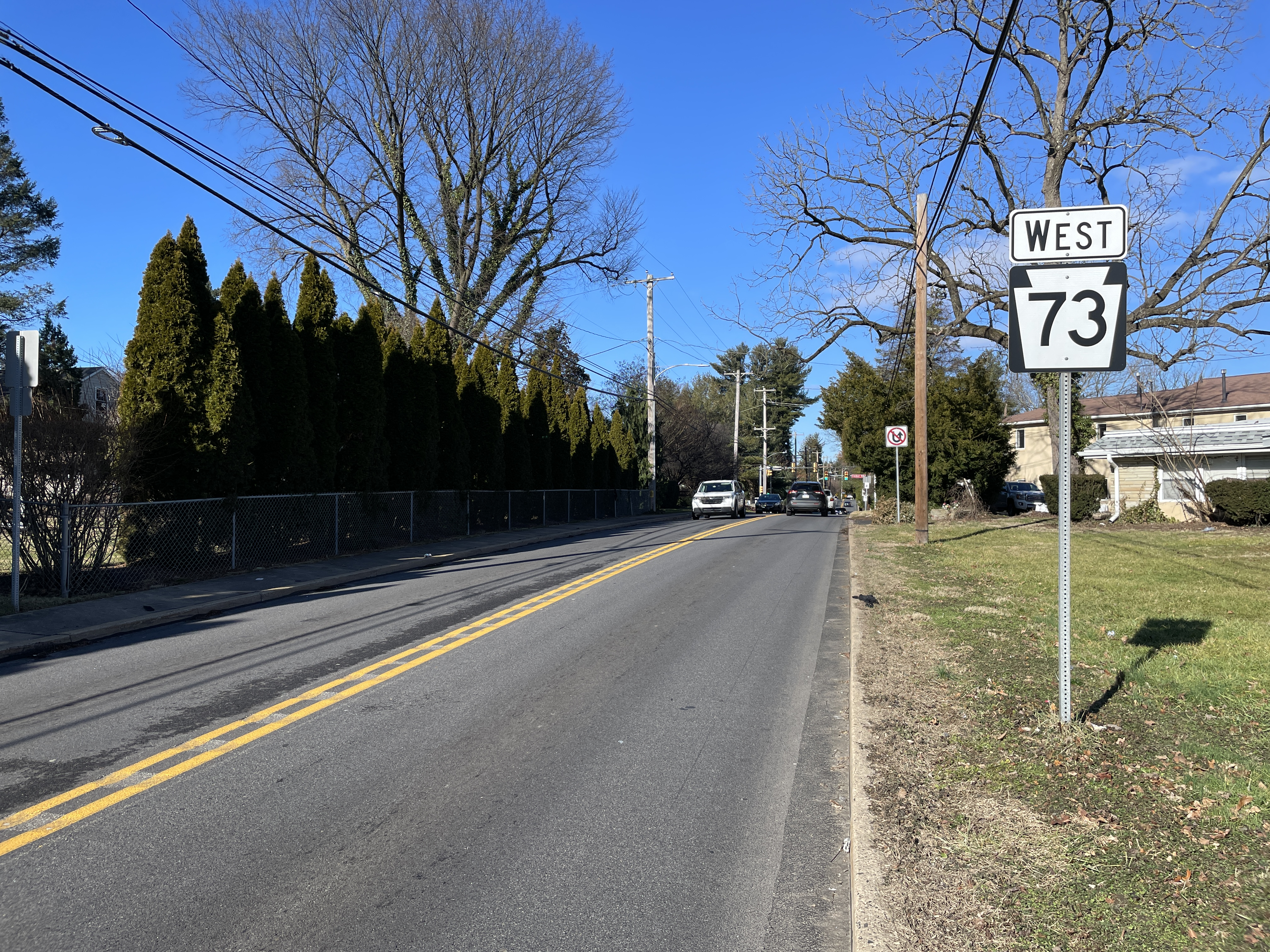
PA 73 westbound in Elkins Park

In the original 1928 routing, PA 73 ran between PA 23 near Blue Ball and US 1 (Roosevelt Boulevard) in Philadelphia. The route followed New Holland Road north through Bowmansville and Knauers to Reading, where it passed through the city along US 222 (Lancaster Avenue), Bingaman Street, Chestnut Street, and US 422 (Perkiomen Avenue). From Reading, PA 73 split from US 422 in Mount Penn and followed Carsonia Avenue and Friedensburg Road to Oley, where it picked up its current routing to Cheltenham Township. Here, PA 73 continued east along Church Road, Township Line Road, and Cottman Avenue to US 1. Upon being designated, PA 73 was paved between south of Reading and Schwenksville and between Skippack and Philadelphia. After the Tacony–Palmyra Bridge was built in 1929, the eastern terminus was moved to its current location on the bridge at the New Jersey state line. It followed Cottman Avenue, US 13 (Frankford Avenue), and US 422 (Levick Street) to the bridge.

By 1930, PA 73 was paved in the Bowmansville area and from south of Reading to south of Angelica; the remainder of the route between Blue Ball and Reading was under construction at this time. The route was also paved between Schwenksville and Skippack. Also, the current route between US 120 (now PA 61) in Leesport and US 22 (now US 222) in Maiden Creek became a paved extension of the former PA 383, which continued west from Leesport to PA 83 (now PA 183) near Leinbachs. In the 1930s, PA 383 was realigned off the present-day route west of Ontelanuee Drive, having been rerouted to head north on Ontelaunee Drive. By 1940, the entire length of PA 73 was paved. The route was realigned to follow Greenwood Avenue from Church Road to Jenkintown, where it turned southeast onto Township Line Road. Also in the 1930s, US 422/PA 73 was shifted to follow Mineral Spring Road between Reading and Mount Penn. In 1950, PA 73 was moved to a straighter alignment to the east of Oley.

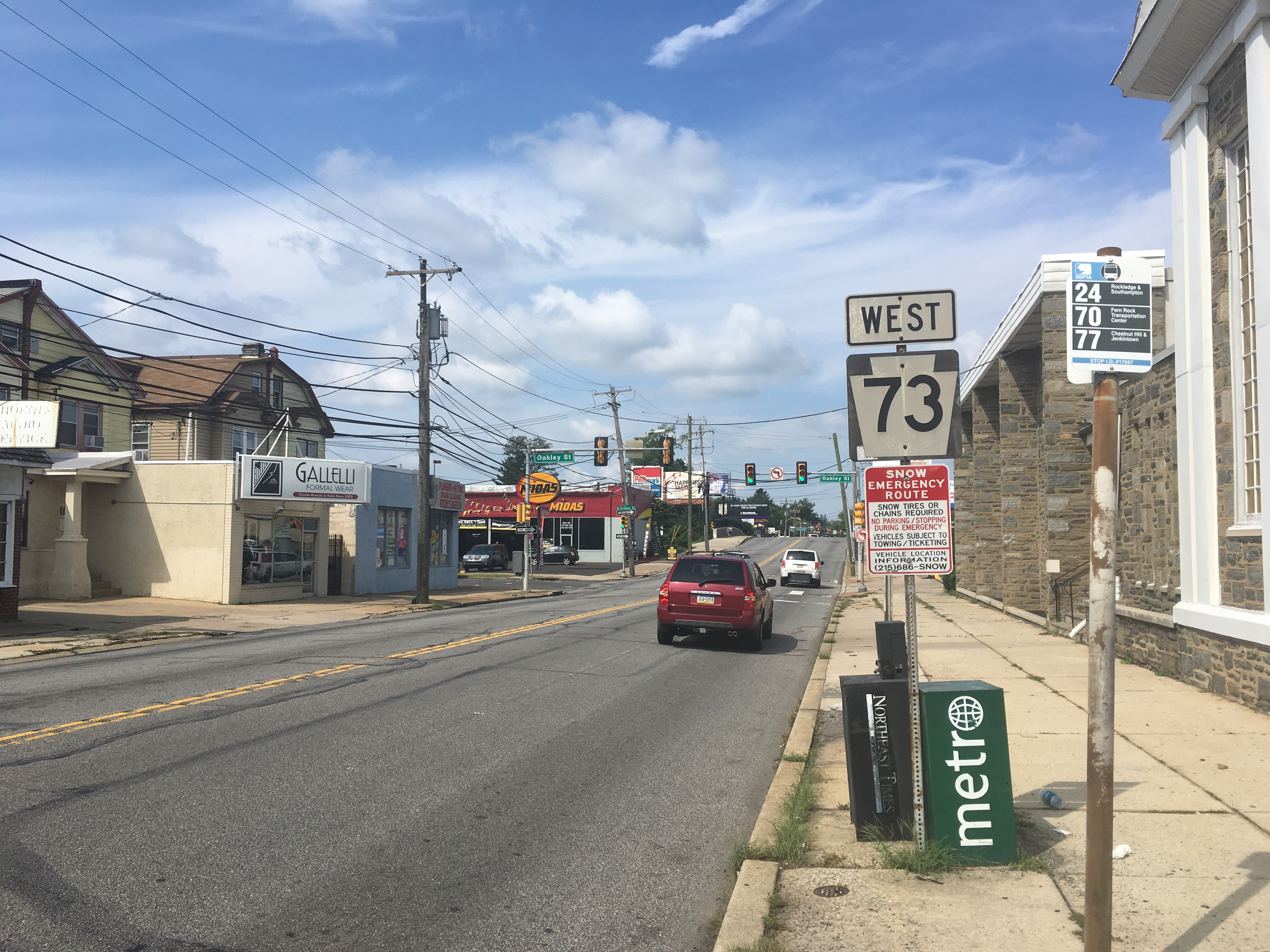
PA 73 (Cottman Avenue) westbound past PA 232 (Oxford Avenue) and Rising Sun Avenue in Northeast Philadelphia

In the 1950s, PA 73 was routed onto the one-way pair of Robbins Street eastbound and Levick Street westbound between US 13 (Frankford Avenue) and the Tacony–Palmyra Bridge; the US 422 concurrency was removed as well. Also, the route was realigned to use Washington Lane between Church Road and Township Line Road. Between Reading and Mount Penn, US 422/PA 73 was shifted to the one-way pair of Perkiomen Avenue eastbound and Mineral Spring Road westbound while PA 73 was designated concurrent with westbound US 422 Alt. on Chestnut Street between Bingaman Street and US 422 in Reading. By 1966, PA 73 was realigned at Oley to follow its current alignment west to PA 61 in Leesport, replacing a portion of PA 383 between east of Leesport and Maiden Creek. The former alignment of PA 73 became PA 625 between PA 23 in Blue Ball and US 222 (now US 222 Bus.) in Reading with most of the remainder between Reading and Oley becoming unnumbered except along the concurrencies with US 222 and US 422 Bus. In the 1960s, PA 73 was rerouted at US 13 (Frankford Avenue) to follow Cottman Avenue, the one-way pair of Princeton Avenue eastbound and Cottman Avenue westbound past Torresdale Avenue, State Road, and New State Road to the Tacony–Palmyra Bridge.

On November 24, 1998, an act of the Pennsylvania General Assembly designated the portion of PA 73 between North Wales Road and Butler Pike in Whitpain Township as the POW/MIA Memorial Highway in honor of soldiers who are prisoner of war (POW) or missing in action (MIA). On November 26, 2008, a Pennsylvania General Assembly act designated the section of PA 73 along Cottman Avenue between Central Avenue and Algon Avenue in Northeast Philadelphia the Police Sergeant Stephen Liczbinski Memorial Highway in honor of an officer of the Philadelphia Police Department who was killed in the line of duty; signs were installed in 2012.

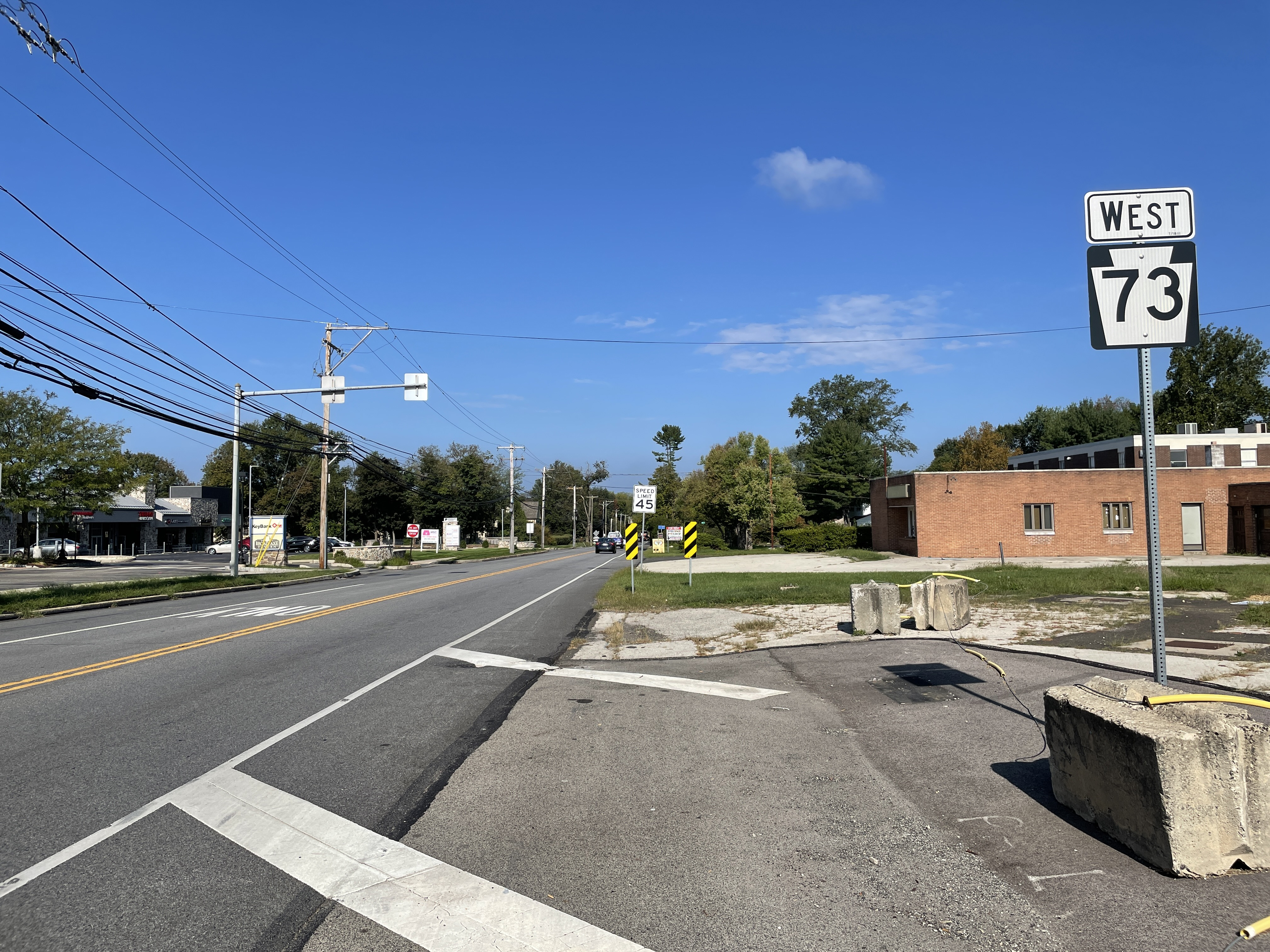
PA 73 westbound past Butler Pike in Broad Axe

In 2009, a $212.3 million project began to reconstruct the interchange between PA 73 and I-95 as part of rebuilding the stretch of I-95 through Northeast Philadelphia. The first phase of the project relocated the ramp to southbound I-95 from Princeton Avenue to Longshore Street, converted Princeton Avenue and Cottman Avenue to two-way traffic, reconstructed and widened State Road at the interchange, and added an on-ramp spur from Milnor Street to the ramp from Princeton Avenue to northbound I-95. On August 31, 2011, Cottman Avenue became a two-way road between Torresdale Avenue and State Road, carrying one eastbound lane and two westbound lanes. The first phase was completed in 2012. The second phase of the interchange reconstruction, which lasted from late 2012 to January 2018, reconstructed and widened I-95 in the vicinity of the PA 73 interchange, added improvements to surface streets crossing under I-95, and rebuilt the ramps from both directions of I-95 and the ramp to northbound I-95. The final phase of the project will build a ramp from Cottman Avenue to southbound I-95 and construct utility improvements; work on this phase is expected to begin in late 2020 or early 2021.

In 2009, a roundabout was constructed at the intersection of PA 29 and PA 73 in Lower Frederick Township; crashes decreased at this junction after the roundabout opened. On March 29, 2019, the Pennsylvania Department of Transportation announced plans to construct roundabouts at both intersections between PA 73 and PA 662 in Oley Township. Construction of the roundabouts, which cost $5.7 million, began in April 2019. The roundabout at PA 73 and PA 662 on the eastern end of Oley opened on August 19, 2019 while the roundabout at PA 73 and PA 662 on the western end of Oley opened in November 2019.

On January 31, 2025, a Learjet 55 medical aircraft crashed on PA 73 in Northeast Philadelphia near the intersection with Roosevelt Boulevard (US 1). As a result, a portion of the route between Roosevelt Boulevard and Bustleton Avenue was closed for five days for cleanup and crash site investigation, eventually reopening on February 5, 2025.

== Major intersections ==
County	Location	mi	km	Destinations	Notes
Berks	Ontelaunee Township	0.000	0.000	PA 61 (Pottsville Pike) – Tuckerton, Leesport, Pottsville	Western terminus
Berks	Maidencreek Township	2.750	4.426	US 222 – Allentown, Reading	
Berks	Ruscombmanor Township	6.660	10.718	PA 12 (Pricetown Road) – Pricetown, Reading	
Berks	Ruscombmanor Township	8.877	14.286	PA 662 north – Fleetwood	Roundabout; west end of PA 662 overlap
Berks	Oley Township	10.550	16.979	PA 662 south – Douglassville	Roundabout; east end of PA 662 overlap
Berks	Boyertown	20.297	32.665	PA 562 west (Reading Avenue) – St. Lawrence	Eastern terminus of PA 562
Montgomery	Douglass Township	21.221	34.152	PA 100 – Allentown, Pottstown	Interchange
Montgomery	New Hanover Township	24.388	39.249	PA 663 south (North Charlotte Street) – Pottstown	West end of PA 663 overlap
Montgomery	New Hanover Township	24.624	39.628	PA 663 north – Pennsburg	East end of PA 663 overlap
Montgomery	Lower Frederick Township	30.236	48.660	PA 29 north – Perkiomenville	Roundabout; west end of PA 29 overlap
Montgomery	Perkiomen Township	32.487	52.283	PA 29 south (Gravel Pike) – Collegeville	East end of PA 29 overlap
Montgomery	Skippack Township	36.165	58.202	PA 113 (Bridge Road) – Harleysville, Rahns	
Montgomery	Worcester Township	39.905	64.221	PA 363 (Valley Forge Road) – Lansdale, Fairview	
Montgomery	Whitpain Township	43.708	70.341	US 202 (DeKalb Pike) – Doylestown, Norristown	
Montgomery	Springfield Township	49.814	80.168	PA 309 – Montgomeryville, Philadelphia	Interchange
Montgomery	Cheltenham Township	52.328	84.214	PA 152 (Limekiln Pike) – Edge Hill, Philadelphia	
Montgomery	Cheltenham–Abington township line	54.542	87.777	PA 611 (Old York Road) – Willow Grove, Philadelphia	
Philadelphia	Philadelphia	57.499	92.536	PA 232 (Oxford Avenue)	
Philadelphia	Philadelphia	59.422	95.630	US 1 (Roosevelt Boulevard)	Interchange
Philadelphia	Philadelphia	60.323	97.080	US 13 (Frankford Avenue)	
Philadelphia	Philadelphia	61.630	99.184	I-95 – New York, Central Philadelphia, Chester	Exit 30 on I-95
Philadelphia	Philadelphia	62.319	100.293	Levick Street	Interchange
Delaware River		62.319	100.293	Tacony–Palmyra Bridge (westbound toll in New Jersey)	
Delaware River		62.319	100.293	Route 73 south	Continuation into New Jersey state line
1.000 mi = 1.609 km; 1.000 km = 0.621 mi: Concurrency terminus; Tolled

== PA 73 Alternate Truck ==
=== Schwenksville ===
PA Route 73 Alternate Truck
- Location: Schwenksville, Pennsylvania
- Existed: 2019–present

Pennsylvania Route 73 Alternate Truck is a truck route bypassing a weight-restricted bridge over the East Branch Perkiomen Creek near Schwenksville. The route follows Plank Road and PA 29. It was formed in 2019.

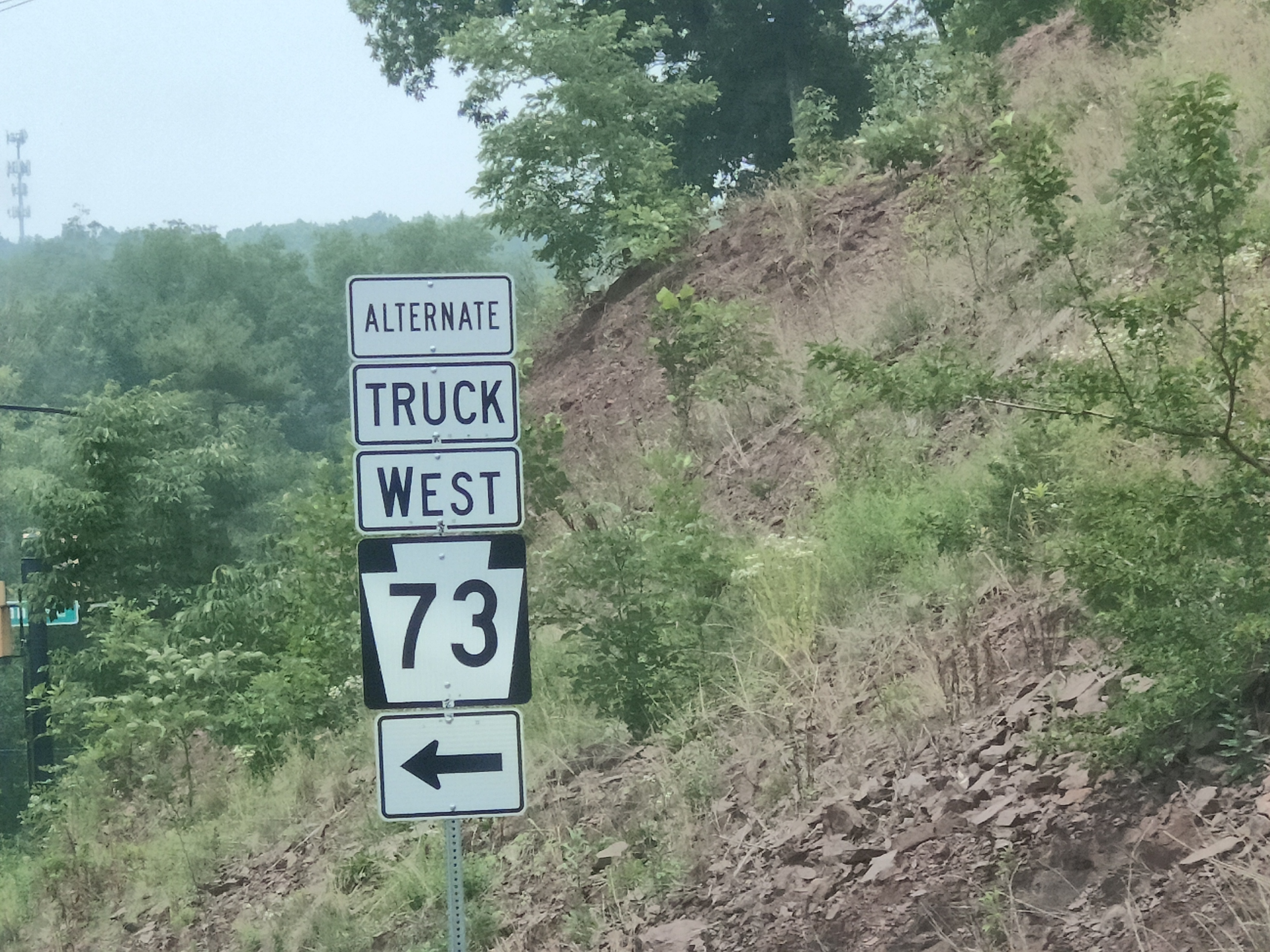
PA 73 Alternate Truck at its eastern terminus.

=== Oreland ===
PA Route 73 Alternate Truck
- Location: Oreland
- Existed: 2013–2019

Pennsylvania Route 73 Alternate Truck were truck routes of PA 73 that bypassed a weight-restricted bridge over a branch of the Wissahickon Creek at the PA 309 interchange in Oreland, on which trucks over 36 tons and combination loads over 40 tons were prohibited. The eastbound alternate truck route followed PA 309 and Paper Mill Road. The westbound alternate truck route followed Paper Mill Road and Bethlehem Pike. There was also a PA 73 Alt. Truck for traffic from northbound PA 309 to access westbound PA 73, following PA 309 north from PA 73 to the Pennsylvania Turnpike (I-276) interchange, where it utilized the cloverleaf ramps to return to southbound PA 309 and head south to the PA 73 exit. PA 73 Alt. Truck was signed in 2013. As recently as 2019, weight restrictions were removed on the bridge, and signage was removed, eliminating the route.
