= Cedars, Pennsylvania =

Unincorporated community in Pennsylvania, US

- Unincorporated community
- Location within Pennsylvania
- Coordinates: 40°12′45″N 75°22′07″W
- Country: United States
- State: Pennsylvania
- County: Montgomery
- Township: Worcester
- Elevation: 259 ft (79 m)
- Time zone: UTC-5 (Eastern (EST))
  - Summer (DST): UTC-4 (EDT)
- ZIP code: 19423
- Area codes: 610 and 484
- GNIS feature ID: 1203240

Cedars is an unincorporated community in Worcester Township in Montgomery County, Pennsylvania, United States. Cedars is located at the intersection of Pennsylvania Route 73 and Bustard Road.
