= Frederick, Pennsylvania =

Unincorporated community in Pennsylvania, US

- Unincorporated community
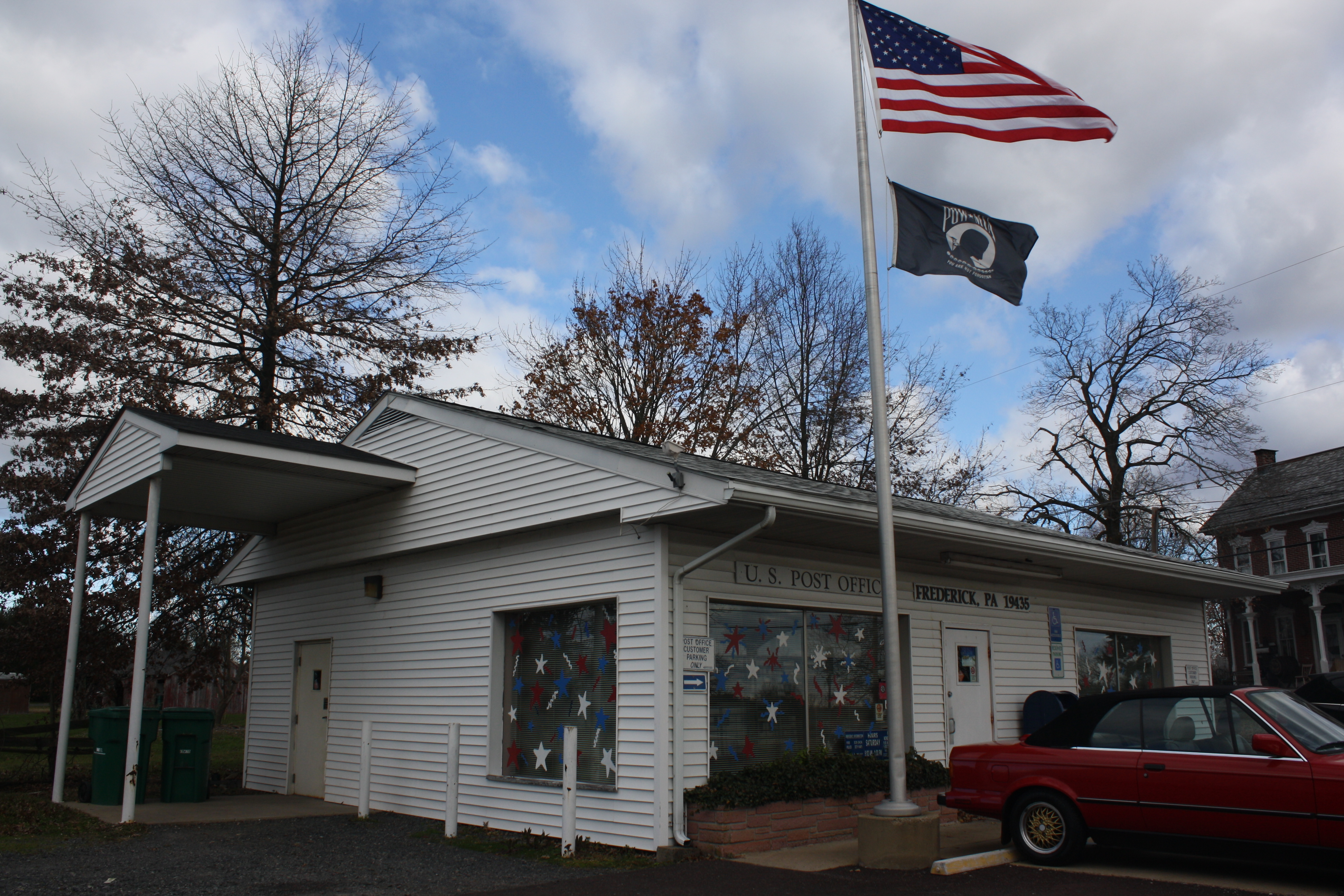
- Frederick Post Office

- Location within Pennsylvania
- Coordinates: 40°18′10″N 75°31′46″W
- Country: United States
- State: Pennsylvania
- County: Montgomery
- Township: Upper Frederick
- Elevation: 335 ft (102 m)
- Time zone: UTC-5 (Eastern (EST))
  - Summer (DST): UTC-4 (EDT)
- ZIP code: 19435
- Area codes: 610 and 484
- GNIS feature ID: 1203627

Frederick is an unincorporated community in Upper Frederick Township in Montgomery County, Pennsylvania, United States. Frederick is located at the intersection of Pennsylvania Route 73 and Colonial Road.
