= Peter Wentz Homestead =

Historic house in Pennsylvania, United States

- U.S. National Register of Historic Places
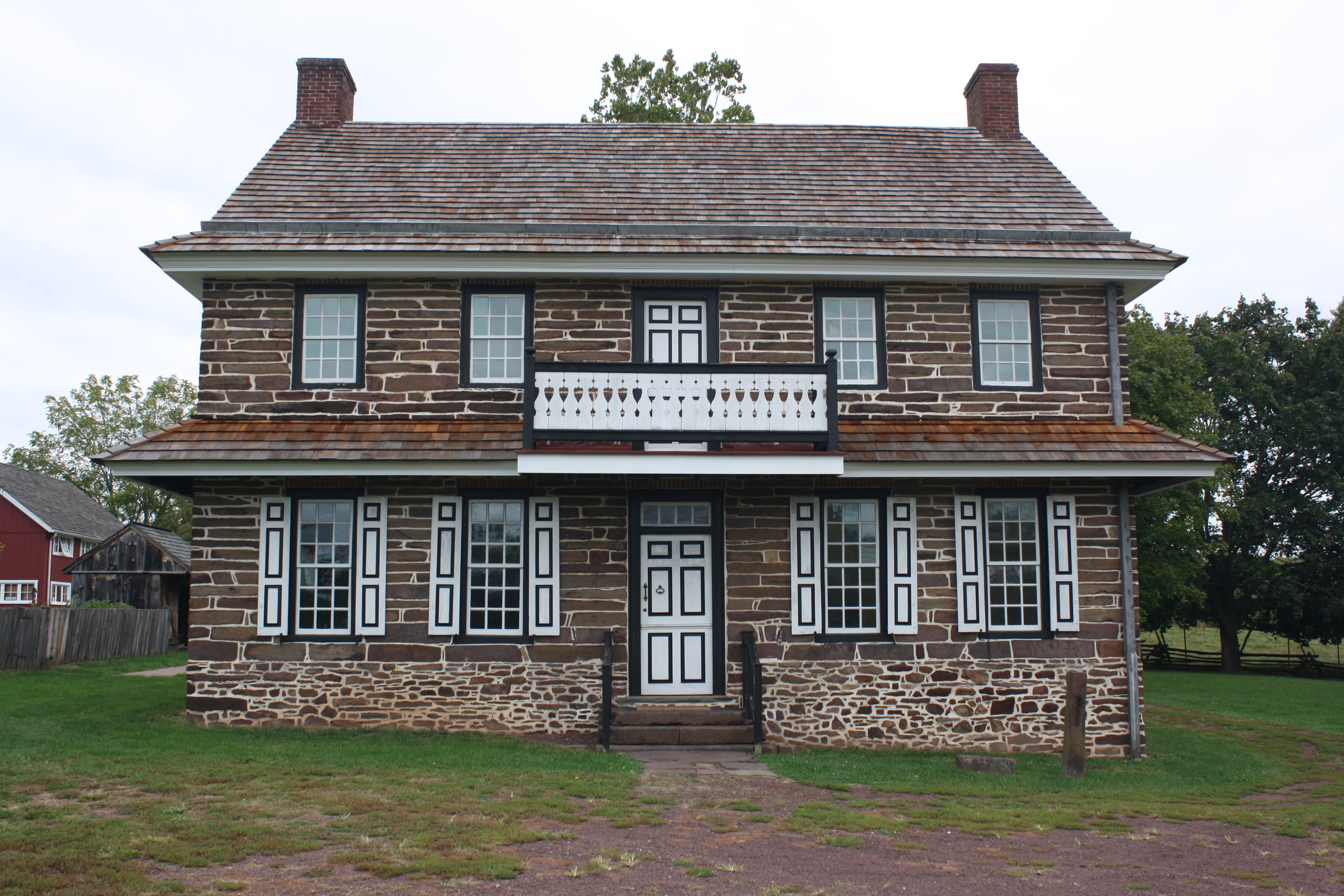
- Peter Wentz Homestead. September 2012.

- Location within Pennsylvania Location within the United States
- Location: Schultz Rd., Worcester Township, Pennsylvania
- Coordinates: 40°11′56″N 75°20′2″W
- Area: 9.9 acres (4.0 ha)
- Built: 1758
- Architectural style: Georgian
- NRHP reference No.: 73001656
- Added to NRHP: May 8, 1973

The Peter Wentz Farmstead is an historic, Pennsylvania German farm that has been continuously farmed since 1744. It is located in Worcester Township, Montgomery County, Pennsylvania near Lansdale.

It was added to the National Register of Historic Places in 1973.

== History ==
The first family to till this land was that of Peter and Rosanna Wentz, who were both first-generation Americans. Peter Wentz inherited the property from his father who may have purchased it as early as 1710. The couple had seven children.

The farm was sold to Dewalt Bieber in 1784 and then to Melchior Schultz, a minister of the Schwenkfelder faith, in 1794. Schultz family descendants owned the home until 1969 when it was purchased by the County of Montgomery.

The Georgian-style farmhouse was built in 1758, and is a large 2 1/2-story, dwelling with attached out(summer) kitchen and bake oven. The main house consists of two floors with four rooms each and a central passageway on both, a cellar with a corner water spring trough and a full attic. The front facade is built of dressed local red shale and sandstone. The remainder of the building is built of uncut sandstone and localized red shale stone. Located nearby is a circa 1920's poultry house building that has been converted to a visitor center with restrooms and a gift-shop and employees offices upstairs. Also located on the property, there are many reconstructed outbuildings, including an Privy, a smokehouse, a woodshed, an ice-house, a barn, a chicken house, and a sheepfold. Currently, the farm has sheep, cows, and chickens.

The house served as headquarters for the Commander-in-Chief of the Continental Army George Washington before and after the Battle of Germantown, October 2–4 and 16–21, 1777. His Excellency did not travel alone. His "military family" included a staff of a military secretary, several aides-de-camp, a dozen servants and his personal guard unit, the Commander-in-Chief's Guard. That unit consisted of sixty infantry soldiers and three officers. Washington set his 9,000 strong army two miles south on top of the Methacton hill to be in striking distance of 8,000 Crown forces in nearby Germantown.

By October 20 news arrived that the fortifications and breastworks around Philadelphia were completed, the British abandoned their outpost in Germantown. Washington responded by moving his troops within a half days march of Philadelphia. Whitemarsh or Fort Washington was chosen as it was 15 miles (24 km) away.

== See also ==
- National Register of Historic Places in Montgomery County, Pennsylvania
- List of Washington's Headquarters during the Revolutionary War

== Gallery ==
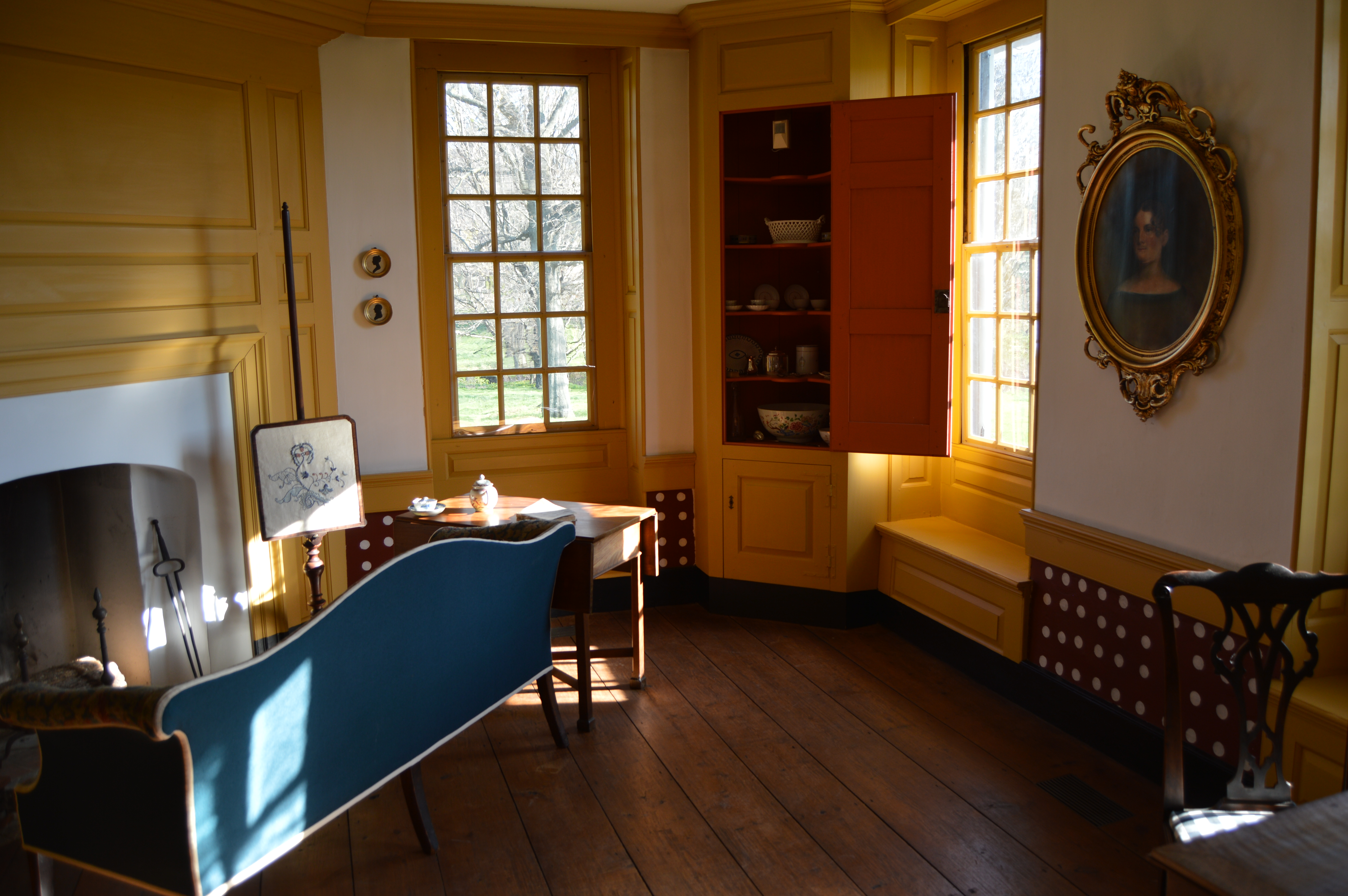
Front room, Peter Wentz residence, April 2016
