= Anthony Morris House =

Historic house in Pennsylvania, United States

- U.S. National Register of Historic Places
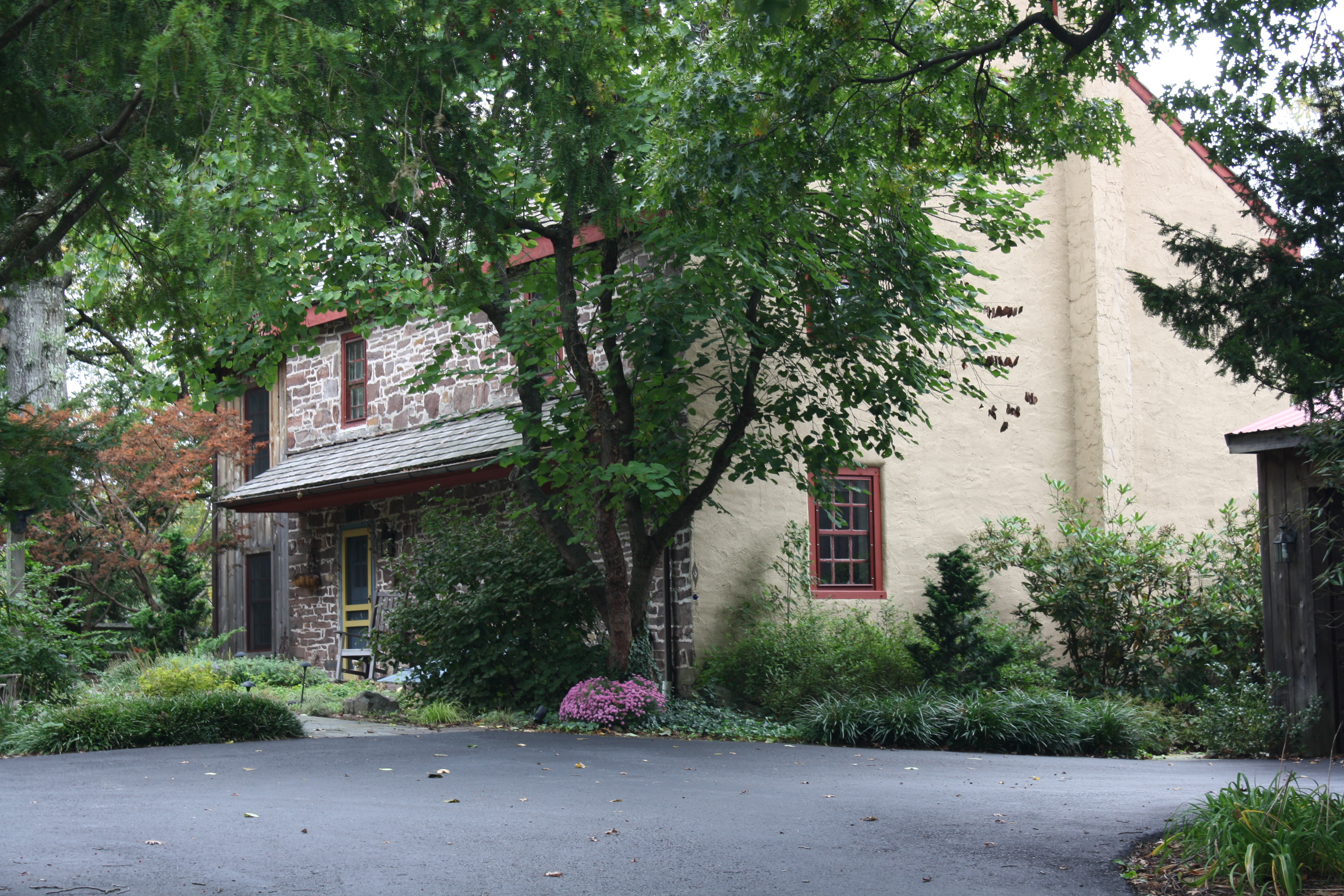
- Anthony Morris House. September 2012.

- Location within Pennsylvania Location within the United States
- Location: North of Norristown on Stump Hall Road, Worcester Township
- Coordinates: 40°11′13″N 75°22′7″W
- Area: 2 acres (0.81 ha)
- Built: 1717
- NRHP reference No.: 80003581
- Added to NRHP: December 3, 1980

Anthony Morris House is a historic home located near Norristown in Worcester Township, Montgomery County, Pennsylvania. The log house was built in 1717, and is a two-story, two bay by two bay, stone dwelling. It measures approximately 25 feet square.

It was added to the National Register of Historic Places in 1980.
