= Maiden Creek, Pennsylvania =

Unincorporated community in Pennsylvania, US

- Unincorporated community
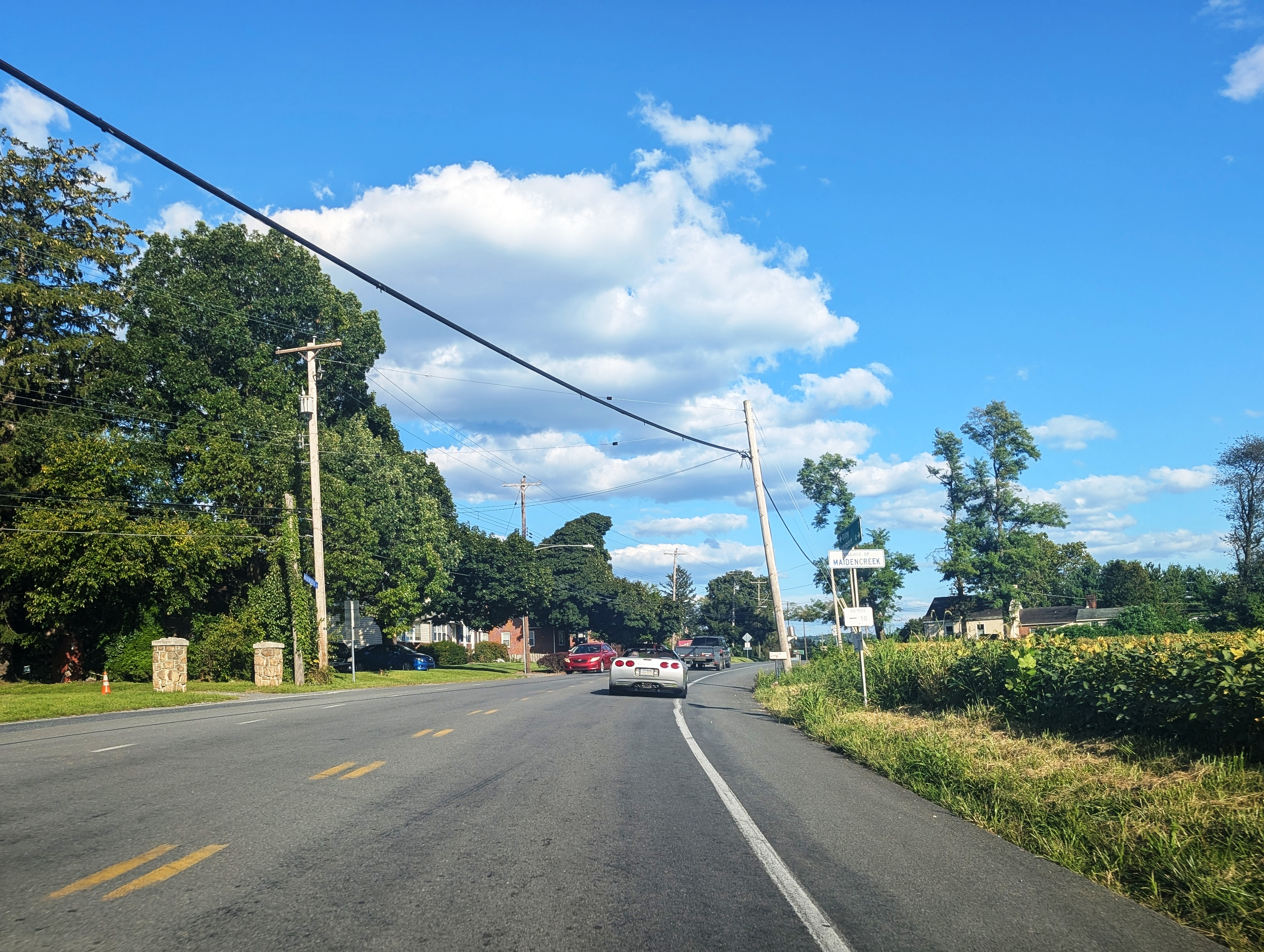
- PA 73 eastbound entering the village

- Location within Pennsylvania Location within the United States
- Coordinates: 40°26′53″N 75°53′54″W
- Country: United States
- State: Pennsylvania
- County: Berks
- Township: Maidencreek
- Elevation: 348 ft (106 m)
- Time zone: UTC-5 (Eastern (EST))
  - Summer (DST): UTC-4 (EDT)
- ZIP codes: 19510, 19605
- Area codes: 610 and 484
- GNIS feature ID: 1204086

Maiden Creek (also spelled Maidencreek) is an unincorporated community in Maidencreek Township in Berks County, Pennsylvania, United States. Maiden Creek is located at the intersection of U.S. Route 222 and Pennsylvania Route 73.
