= Worcester Township, Pennsylvania =

Township in Pennsylvania, US

Worcester Township
- Township
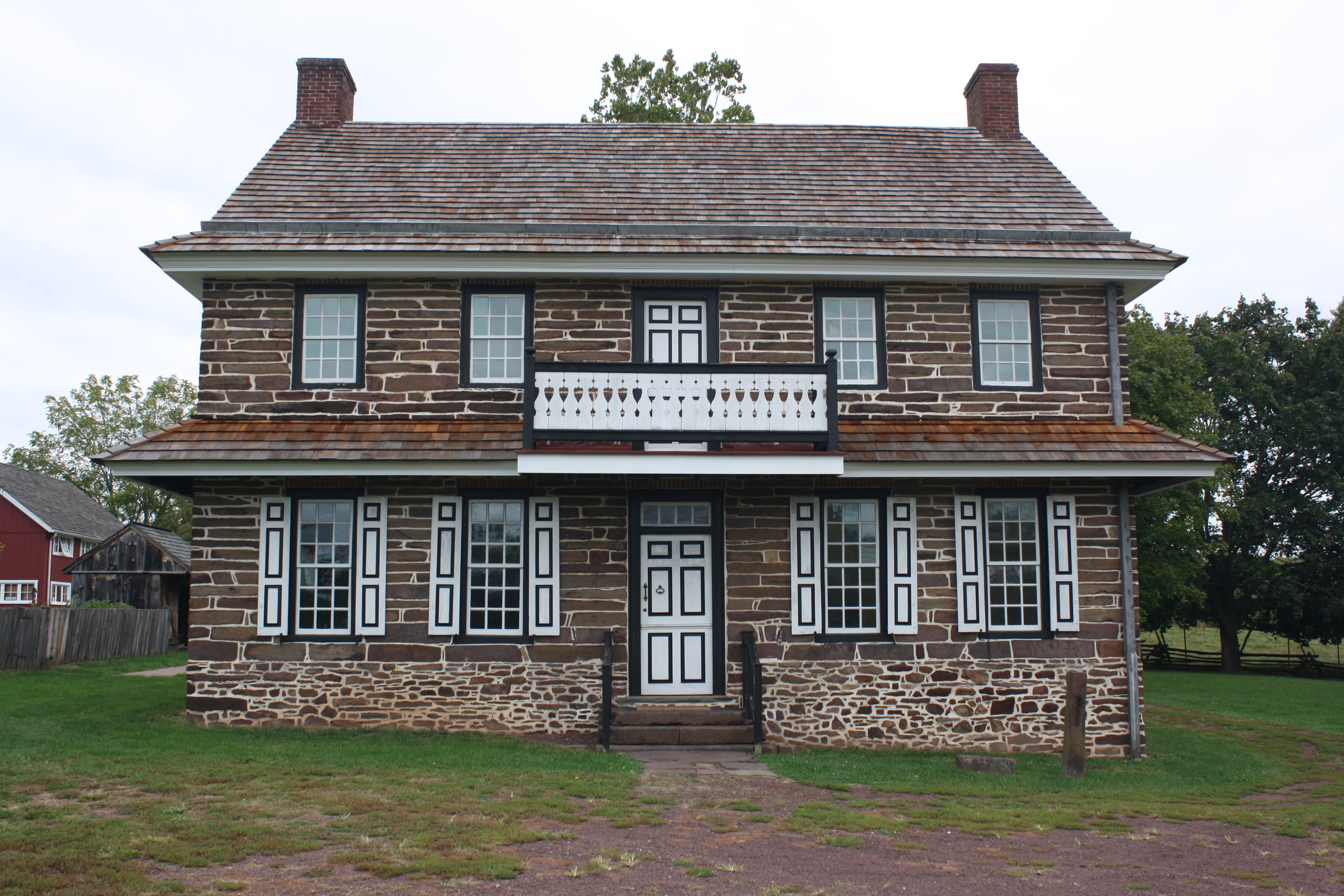
- Peter Wentz Homestead, built in 1758

- Seal

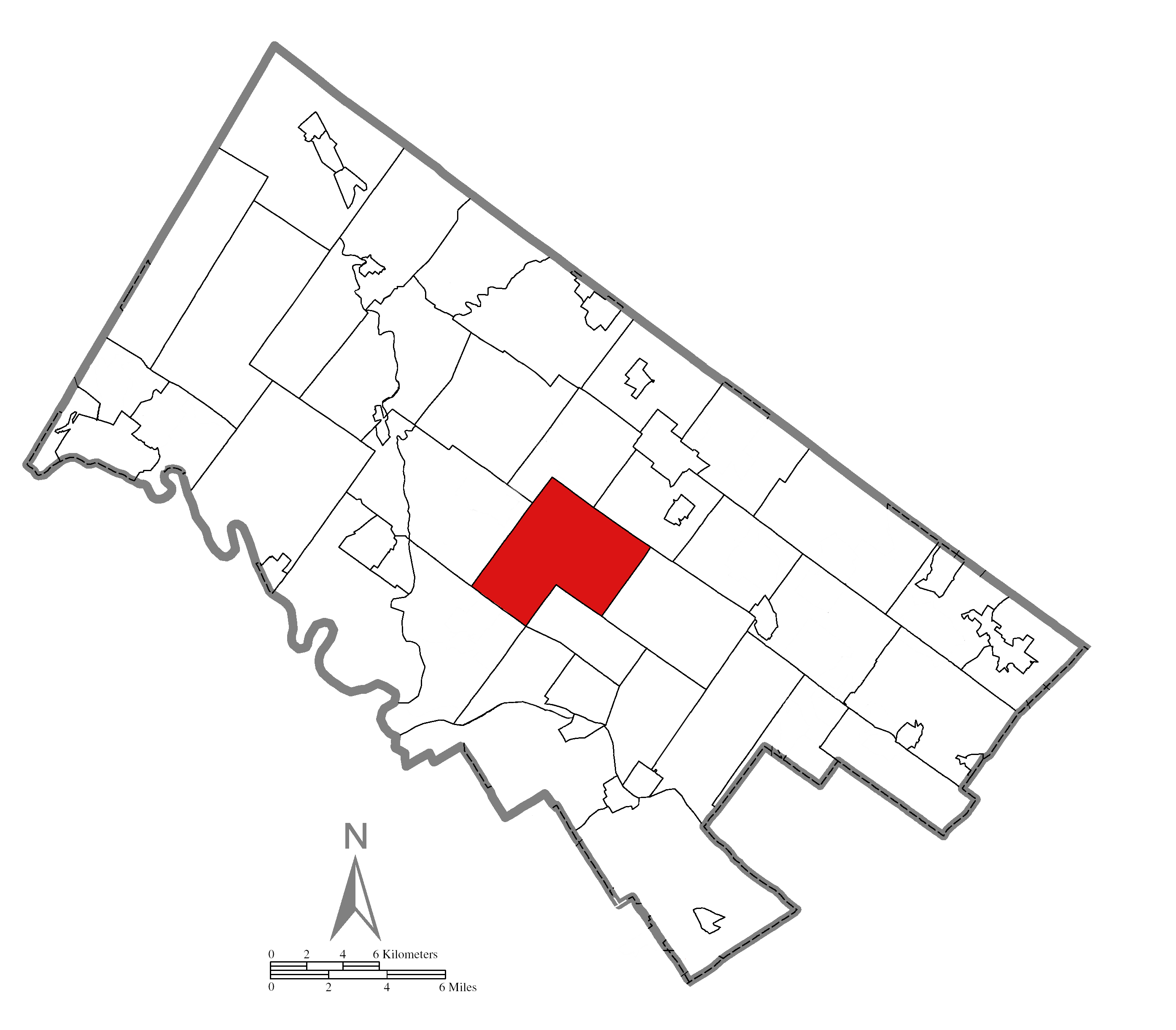
- Location of Worcester Township in Montgomery County, Pennsylvania
- Coordinates: 40°12′48″N 75°21′00″W
- Country: United States
- State: Pennsylvania
- County: Montgomery

Area
  - Total: 16.22 sq mi (42.0 km^{2})
  - Land: 16.22 sq mi (42.0 km^{2})
  - Water: 0.01 sq mi (0.026 km^{2})
- Elevation: 269 ft (82 m)

Population (2010)
  - Total: 9,750
  - Estimate (2016): 10,486
  - Density: 601/sq mi (232/km^{2})
- Time zone: UTC-5 (EST)
  - Summer (DST): UTC-4 (EDT)
- Area codes: 610, 484, 215, 267, 445
- FIPS code: 42-091-86496
- Website: www.worcestertwp.com

Worcester Township (/ˈwʌrsɛstər/ WUR-ses-tər) is a township in Montgomery County, Pennsylvania, United States. The population was 9,750 at the 2010 census.

== History ==
The Anthony Morris House and Peter Wentz Homestead are listed on the National Register of Historic Places.

== Geography ==
According to the United States Census Bureau, the township has a total area of 16.2 square miles (42 km^{2}), of which 0.06% is water. It is in the Schuylkill River watershed and is drained via Skippack Creek, which is a tributary of Perkiomen Creek, and Stony Creek. Its villages include Bethel Hill, Cedars, Center Point, Fairview Village, Heebnerville, Providence Square, and Worcester.

=== Neighboring municipalities ===
- Lower Providence Township (southwest)
- Skippack Township (northwest)
- Towamencin Township (north)
- Upper Gwynedd Township (northeast)
- Whitpain Township (southeast)
- East Norriton Township (south)
- West Norriton Township (tangent to the south)

== Transportation ==
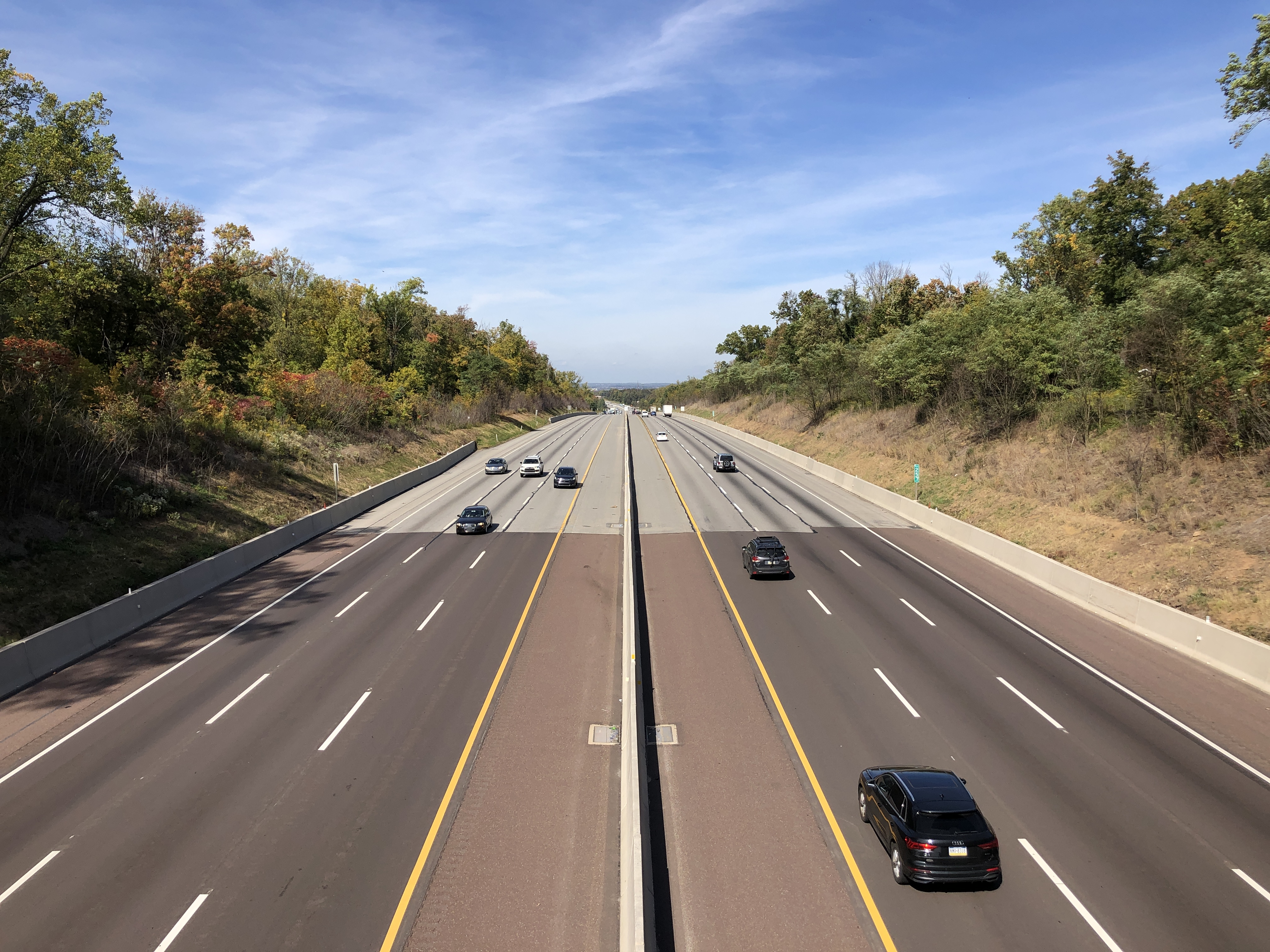
I-476/Pennsylvania Turnpike Northeast Extension northbound in Worcester Township

As of 2020 there were 80.63 miles (129.76 km) of public roads in Worcester Township, of which 2.40 miles (3.86 km) were maintained by the Pennsylvania Turnpike Commission (PTC), 23.20 miles (37.34 km) were maintained by the Pennsylvania Department of Transportation (PennDOT) and 55.03 miles (88.56 km) were maintained by the township.

Interstate 476 (the Northeastern Extension of the Pennsylvania Turnpike) is the most prominent roadway passing through Worcester Township. However, as it has no interchanges within the township boundaries, is not directly accessible. Pennsylvania Route 73 and Pennsylvania Route 363 are the main highways providing local access.

SEPTA operates the Route 91 bus through Worcester Township, which provides Saturday service between the Norristown Transportation Center in Norristown and State Correctional Institution – Phoenix in Skippack Township.

== Demographics ==
Historical population
Census	Pop.	Note	%±
1930	1,487		—
1940	1,609		8.2%
1950	1,939		20.5%
1960	3,250		67.6%
1970	4,243		30.6%
1980	4,661		9.9%
1990	4,686		0.5%
2000	7,789		66.2%
2010	9,750		25.2%
2020	10,317		5.8%
U.S. Decennial Census

As of the 2010 census, the township was 84.0% White, 2.8% Black or African American, 10.3% Asian, and 1.3% were two or more races. 1.6% of the population were of Hispanic or Latino ancestry.

As of the census of 2000, there were 7,789 people, 2,896 households, and 2,145 families residing in the township. The population density was 480.2 inhabitants per square mile (185.4/km^{2}). There were 3,026 housing units at an average density of 72.0/km^{2} (186.6/mi^{2}). The racial makeup of the township was 92.14% White, 2.32% African American, 0.03% Native American, 4.43% Asian, 0.00% Pacific Islander, 0.24% from other races, and 0.83% from two or more races. 0.87% of the population were Hispanic or Latino of any race.

There were 2,896 households, out of which 36.1% had children under the age of 18 living with them, 65.8% were married couples living together, 5.9% had a female householder with no husband present, and 25.9% were non-families. 23.1% of all households were made up of individuals, and 11.2% had someone living alone who was 65 years of age or older. The average household size was 2.69 and the average family size was 3.20.

In the township the population was spread out, with 27.3% under the age of 18, 4.6% from 18 to 24, 28.4% from 25 to 44, 24.3% from 45 to 64, and 15.3% who were 65 years of age or older. The median age was 40 years. For every 100 females there were 94.3 males. For every 100 females age 18 and over, there were 90.9 males.

The median income for a household in the township was $77,200, and the median income for a family was $87,107. Males had a median income of $61,280 versus $42,281 for females. The per capita income for the township was $34,264. About 0.5% of families and 1.7% of the population were below the poverty line, including 2.7% of those under age 18 and 3.3% of those age 65 or over.

== Government and politics ==
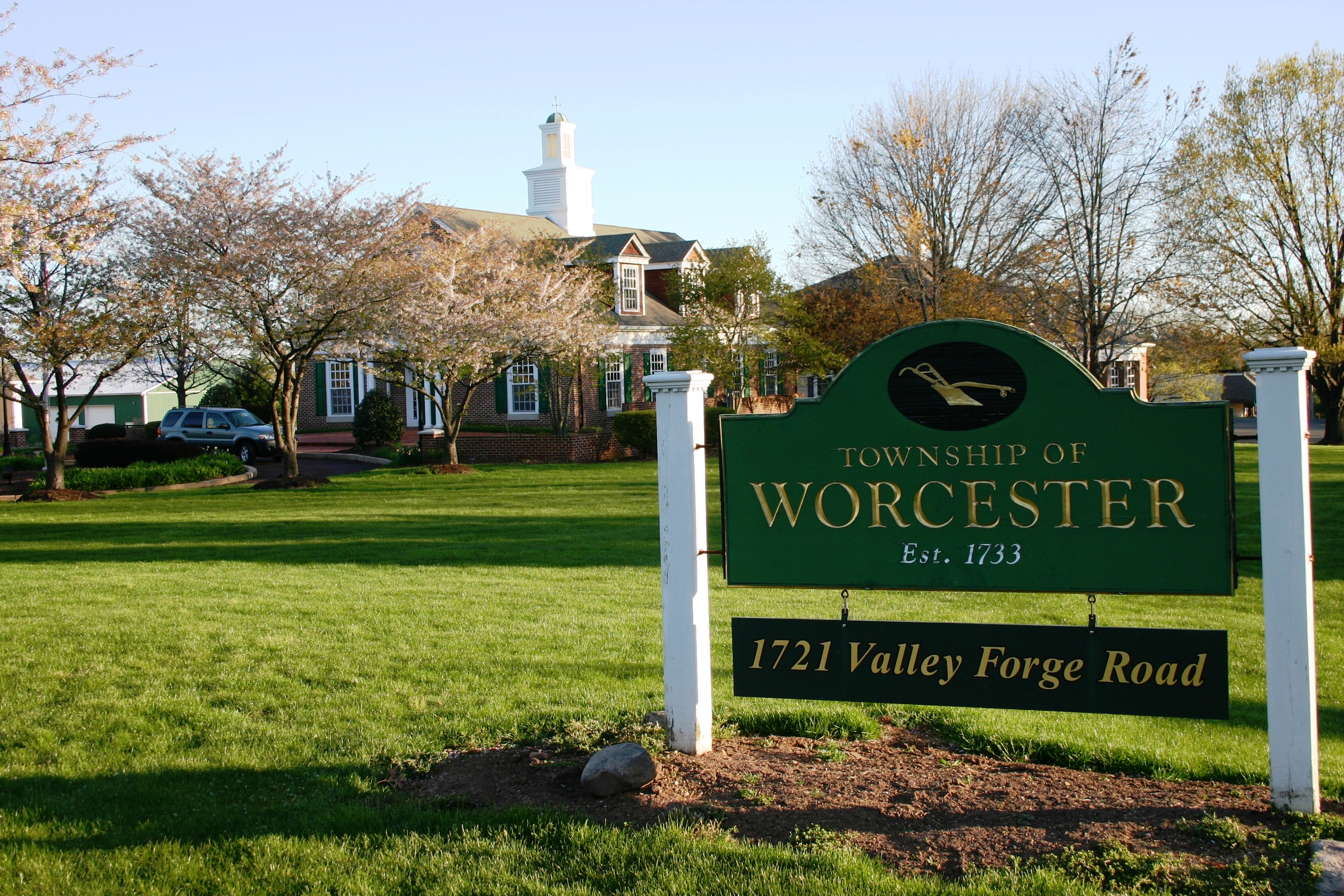
Worcester Township municipal building

Presidential elections results
Year	Republican	Democratic
2024	46.9% 3,485	52.1% 3,871
2020	46.2% 3,279	52.3% 3,708
2016	48.8% 2,928	46.6% 2,798
2012	57.6% 3,123	41.2% 2,234
2008	53.4% 2,793	45.8% 2,392
2004	58.4% 2,873	40.9% 2,012
2000	61.6% 2,350	36.0% 1,375
1996	57.7% 1,702	32.4% 956
1992	52.9% 1,486	27.8% 780

=== Supervisors ===
- Lou Betz, Chair
- Christine Steere, Vice Chair
- Rick DeLello, Member

=== Legislators ===
- State Representative Matthew Bradford, Democrat, 70th district
- State Senator Maria Collett, Democrat, 12th district
- US Representative Madeleine Dean, Democrat, 4th district

=== Administration ===
- Township Manager Dan DeMeno

== Education ==
Worcester is served by the Methacton School District. Almost all of the township is zoned to Worcester Elementary School, while small sections are zoned to Eagleville Elementary School. Skyview Upper Elementary School, Arcola Intermediate School, and Methacton High School serve all parts of the district.

== Trivia ==
- Founded in 1733, and named after Worcester in England.
- It incorporated three earlier villages: Center Point, Cedars Village, and Fairview Village.
- It contains the central Schwenkfelder church.
