= Center Square, Pennsylvania =

Unincorporated community in Pennsylvania, US

Centre Square, Pennsylvania
- Unincorporated community
- Location within Pennsylvania Location within the United States
- Coordinates: 40°10′01″N 75°17′24″W
- Country: United States
- State: Pennsylvania
- County: Montgomery
- Elevation: 256 ft (78 m)
- Time zone: UTC-5 (Eastern (EST))
  - Summer (DST): UTC-4 (EDT)
- ZIP code: 19422
- Area codes: 610 & 484
- GNIS feature ID: 1170306

Center Square is an unincorporated community in Whitpain Township, Pennsylvania, United States, at the junction of U.S. Route 202 and Pennsylvania Route 73. The Stony Creek drains the community, into the Schuylkill River in Norristown. It is served by the Wissahickon School District and by the Blue Bell post office, with the ZIP code of 19422.
