= Worcester, Pennsylvania =

Unincorporated community in Pennsylvania, US

- Unincorporated community
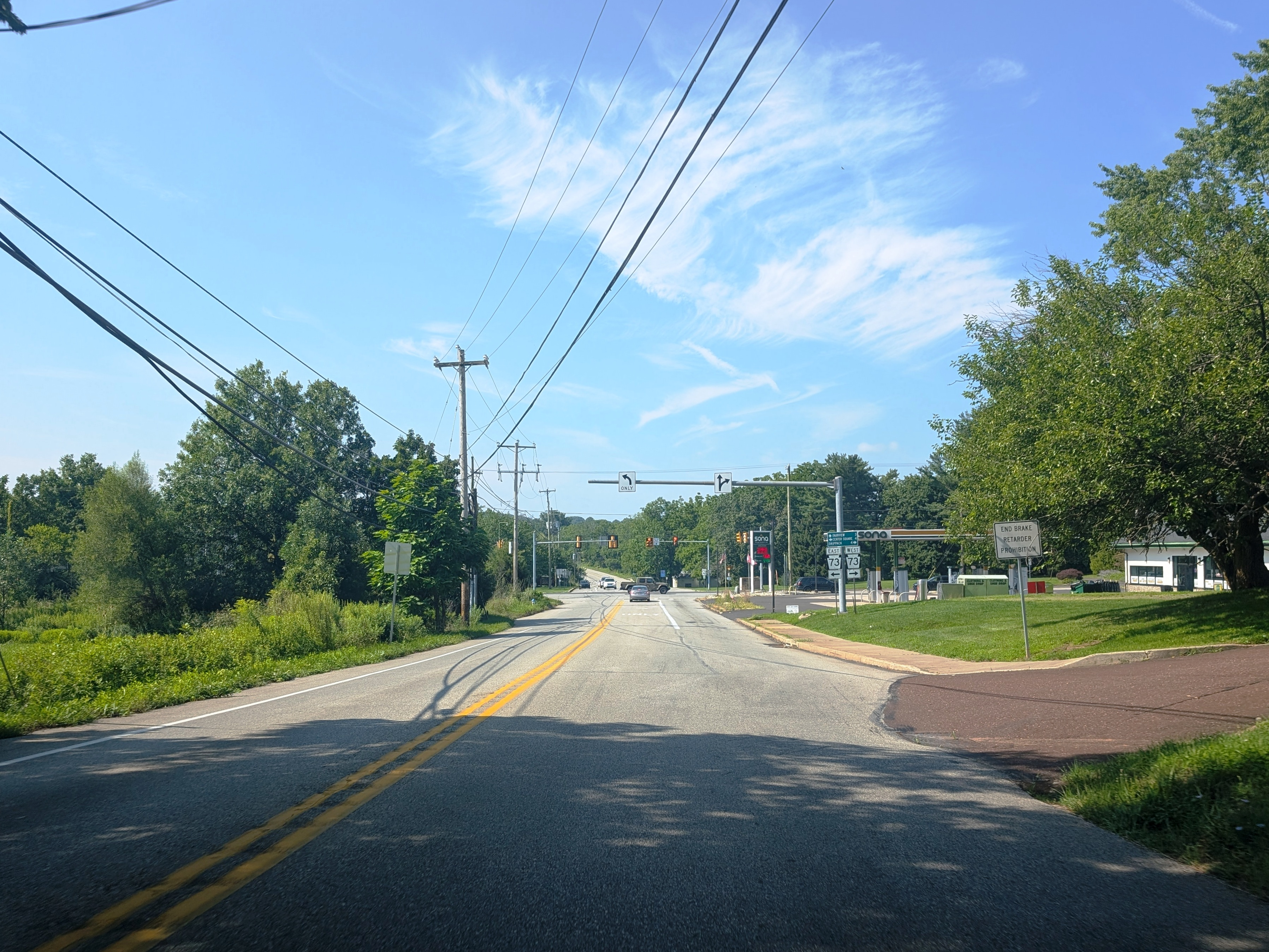
- PA 363 southbound approaching PA 73 in Worcester

- Location within Pennsylvania
- Coordinates: 40°12′04″N 75°20′48″W
- Country: United States
- State: Pennsylvania
- County: Montgomery
- Township: Worcester
- Elevation: 236 ft (72 m)
- Time zone: UTC-5 (Eastern (EST))
  - Summer (DST): UTC-4 (EDT)
- ZIP code: 19490
- Area codes: 610 and 484
- GNIS feature ID: 1204994

Worcester (also known as Center Point) is an unincorporated community in Worcester Township in Montgomery County, Pennsylvania, United States. Worcester is located at the intersection of Pennsylvania Route 73 and Pennsylvania Route 363. The area is drained by the Zacharias Creek westward into the Skippack Creek, a tributary of the Perkiomen Creek. The community is served by the Methacton School District.
