= Edge Hill, Pennsylvania =

Unincorporated community in Pennsylvania, US

Edge Hill
- Unincorporated community and neighborhood
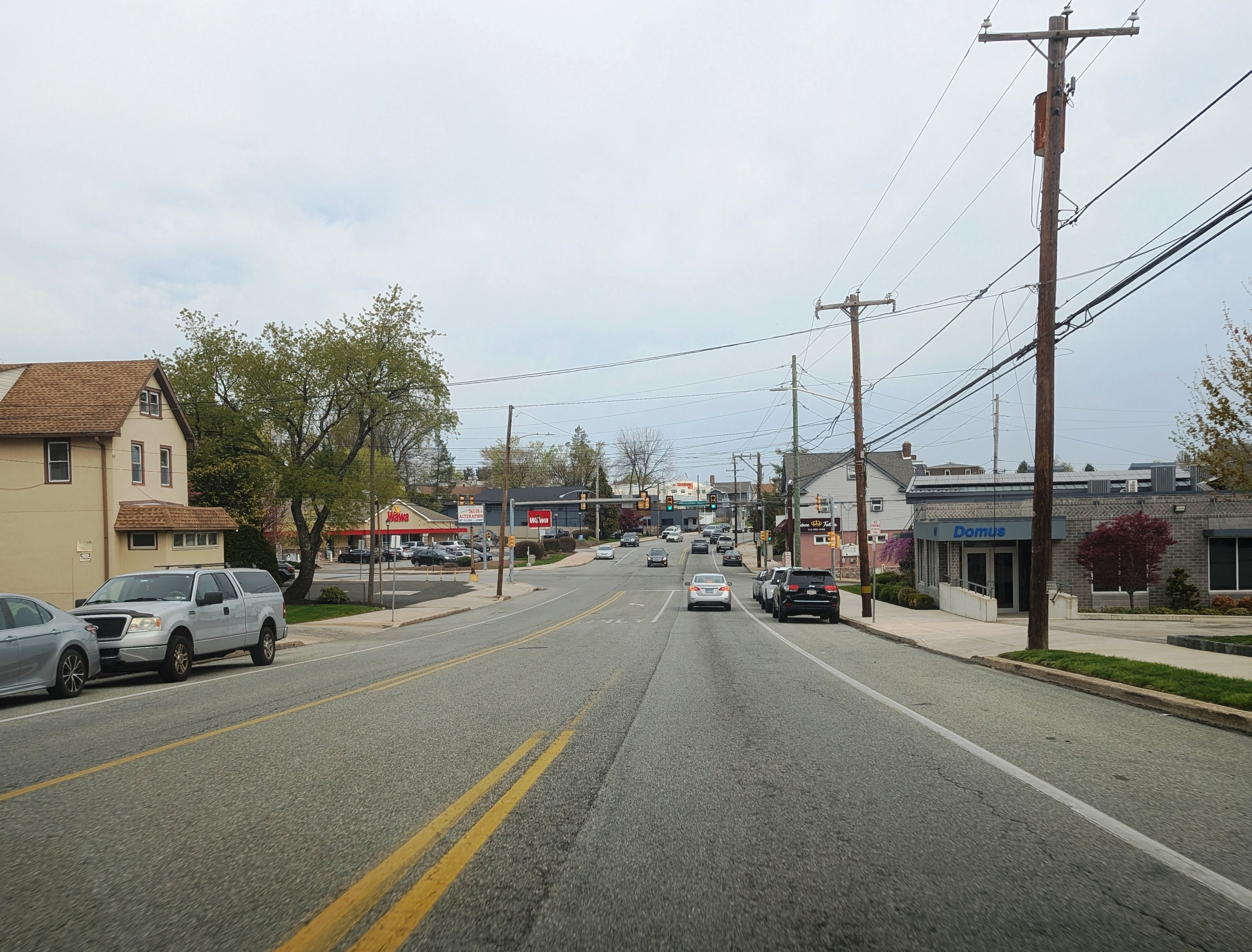
- PA 152 northbound through Edge Hill

- Location of Edge Hill in Pennsylvania Edge Hill (the United States)
- Coordinates: 40°6′12″N 75°9′48″W
- Country: United States
- State: Pennsylvania
- County: Montgomery
- Township: Cheltenham
- Commissioner: J. Andrew Sharkey
- Elevation: 302 ft (92 m)
- Time zone: UTC-5 (Eastern Standard Time)
  - Summer (DST): UTC-4 (Eastern Daylight Time)
- ZIP code: 19038
- Area codes: 215, 267 and 445

Edge Hill is an unincorporated community in Cheltenham Township in Montgomery County, Pennsylvania, United States. Edge Hill is located along Pennsylvania Route 152 between Pennsylvania Route 73 and Mount Carmel Avenue.

Edge Hill is a suburb of Philadelphia.

A stone quarry was established in Edge Hill in the 1880s.
