= Leinbachs, Pennsylvania =

Unincorporated community in Pennsylvania, U.S.

Coordinates: 40°23′33″N 75°59′40″W

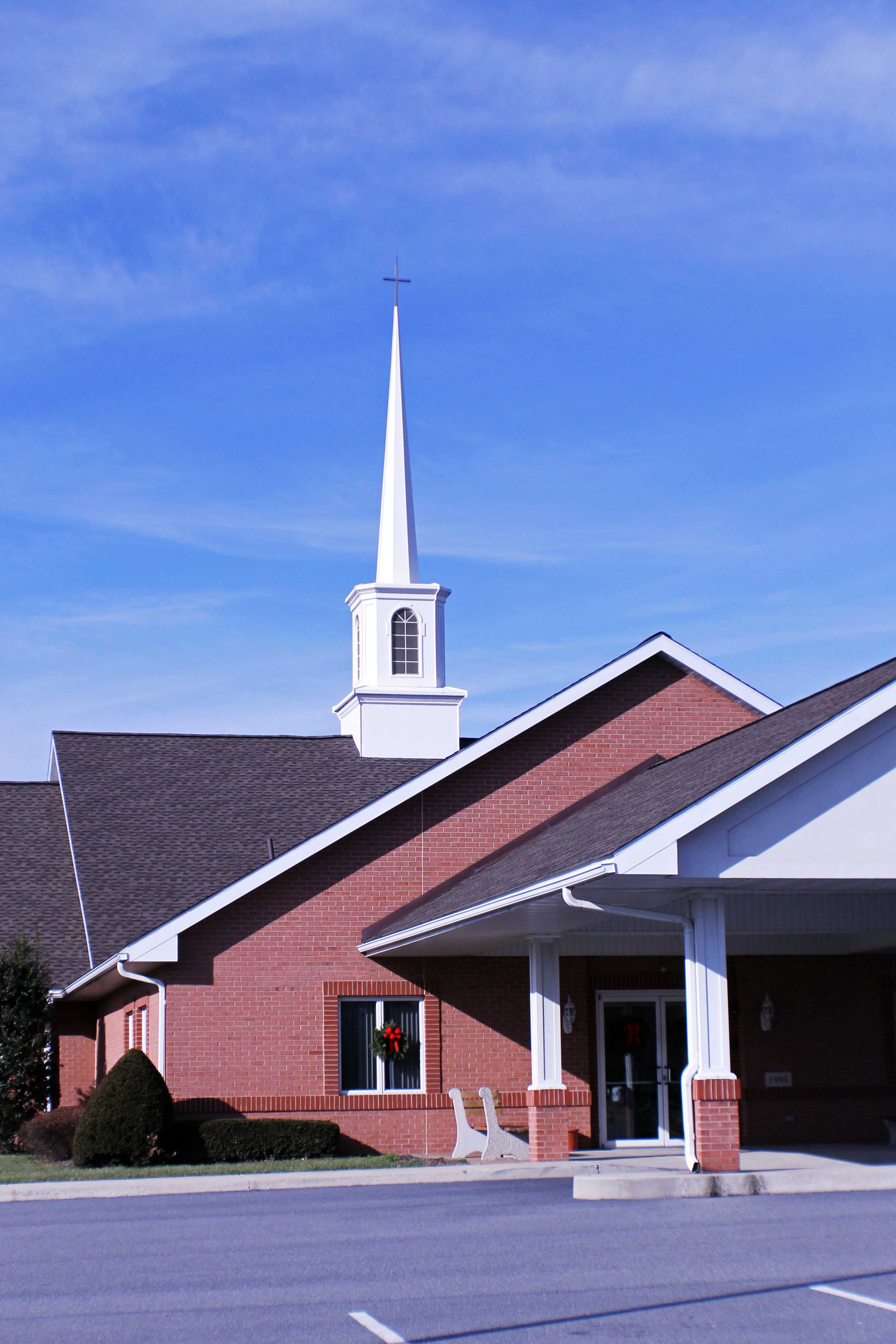
The Lutheran Church of Leinbachs

Leinbachs is an unincorporated community that is located in southern Bern Township, Pennsylvania, United States, just northwest of Reading and the Reading Regional Airport. It is also located near Blue Marsh Lake.

Leinbachs' proximity to these locations has given it significant growth in recent years, including the construction of a suburban development, warehouses, and other enterprises.

== History ==
The town derived its name, "Leinbachs," from the location of a tavern that was owned by a family named Leinbach. During the 1800s, it served as a crossroads stagecoach stop, post office, general store and local tavern. The tavern was later restored and converted into a private residence that still stands today.

Until the 1950s, Leinbachs was a sparsely populated farming community, located just outside of Reading. Since the development of the highway system and the construction of Route 183, Leinbachs has experienced steady growth.

It currently is home to the Bern Township Police Department, as well as a community center. The area is also home to numerous commercial enterprises new to the area, including a Vist Financial bank and a Harley Davidson training and sales facility.
