= Evansburg Historic District =

Historic district in Pennsylvania, United States

- U.S. National Register of Historic Places
- U.S. Historic district
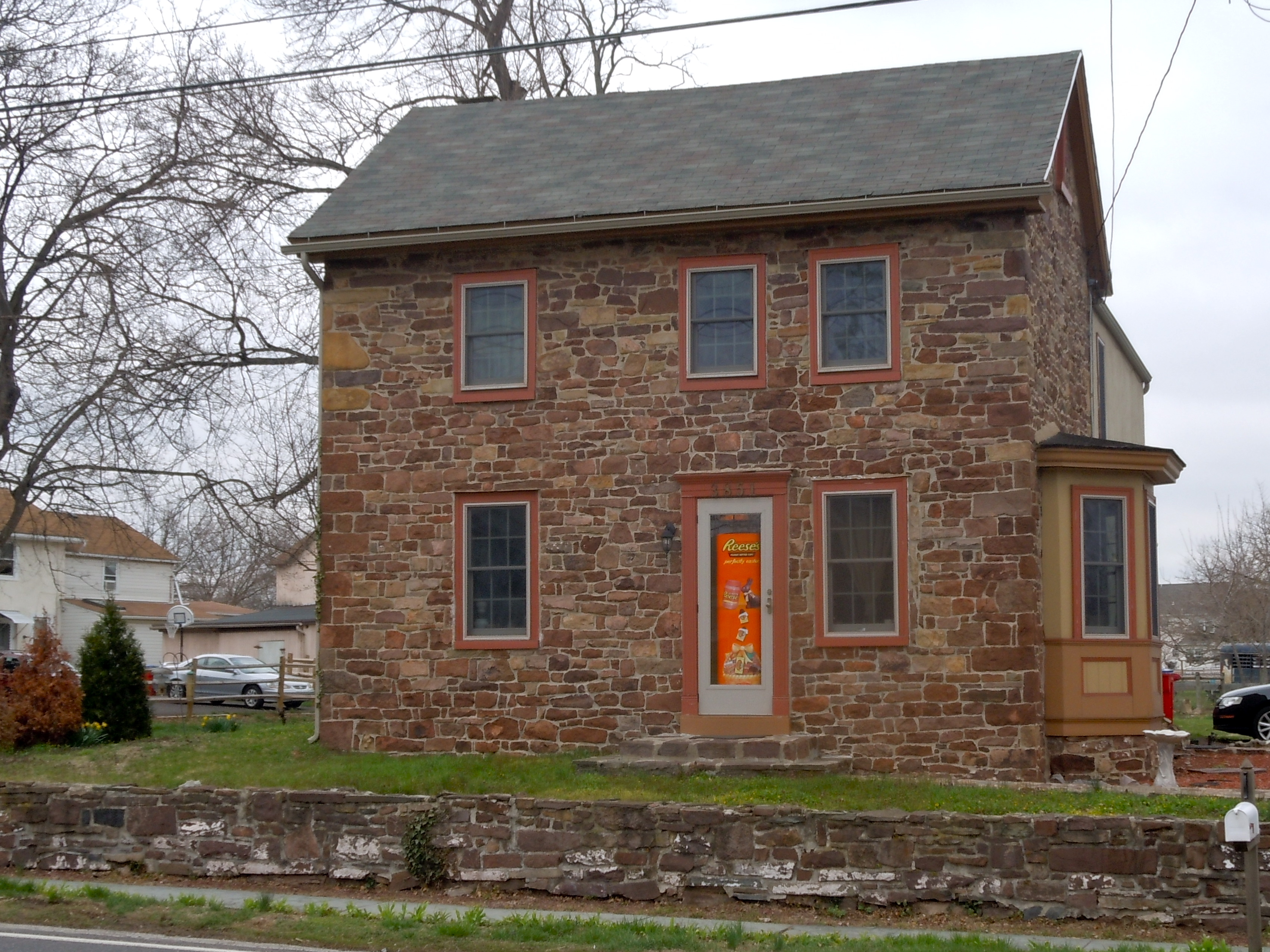
- House in Evansburg

- Location within Pennsylvania Location within the United States
- Location: Lower Providence Township, Pennsylvania, U.S.
- Coordinates: 40°11′20″N 75°26′0″W
- Area: 1.5 square miles (3.9 km^{2}).
- Built: 1700–1875
- Architect: multiple
- Architectural style: multiple, primarily American Colonial, Georgian, Victorian, and Federal
- NRHP reference No.: 72001139
- Added to NRHP: June 19, 1972

The Evansburg Historic District in Evansburg, Pennsylvania, United States, is a National Historic District designated by Congress with over 50 National Register properties dating from the early 18th through 19th century. Almost all of these properties are privately owned and in active use at this time. The Evansburg Historic District was listed on the National Register of Historic Places in 1972.

== History ==
Evansburg is one of America's earliest planned villages, being the conception of William Lane, whose will of 1732 left to the ministers that shall serve successively at St. James' Church, "Forty two acres of land adjoining, which said land shall be laid out as commodious for a settlement as conveniently it may be without causing much damage to the remainder."

Evansburg is part of William Penn's Holy Experiment, where people lived in separate clusters according to their religious, cultural, and national heritage, but were linked together politically and economically in a common destiny that was to become the United States of America. Thus there were the German Lutherans in Trappe, the Welsh Baptists in Eagleville, the Scottish Presbyterians in Norriton, the English Quakers in Plymouth Meeting, the Dutch Mennonite along the Skippack, and the English Anglicans in Evansburg.

The village was at one time known as Hustletown for the "hustling" or "raffling" witnessed by two youngbloods who gave a cheer for Hustletown, according to legend. The nickname probably came from the fact that Hussel Town, an individual, owned land next to Edward Lane in 1773. Originally, the land was purchased on June 3, 1684, from Sachem Maughaugam, chief of the Lenape Native Americans. It was called "Pahkehoma" and later Anglicized to "Perkiomen", meaning "the place where grow the cranberries". "Skippack", the name of the other creek, means "a stagnant stream".

The Evans family, for whom the village is named, have written in history a record of remarkable achievement and fame. Evan Evans, the second minister at Christ Church, Philadelphia, received his Doctor of Divinity from Brasenose College, Oxford, and was sent by the Bishop of London to be the first Church of England minister in these parts. Owen Evans owned jointly with his cousin Oliver Evans the first steam-mill built in America at Pittsburgh, and later his factory in Evansburg produced large numbers of muskets for the War of 1812.

John Evans was instrumental in founding Northwestern University, and the Chicago suburb in which it is located was named Evanston in his honor.

== Geography ==
According to the United States Census Bureau, the Census Designated Place has a total area of 1.5 square miles (3.9 km^{2}), all of it land. The nearby Evansburg State Park takes its name from the CDP.

== Significant contributing properties ==
Some of the district's properties are architecturally or historically noteworthy in themselves. One, the Skippack Bridge, was listed on the National Register prior to the district's creation.

- Heyser Homestead (Nedrow Eye Doctory and House) is located on Township Line Road, Evansburg. The nine acre property accommodates an elegant brownstone barn and several well-preserved outbuildings, including a root cellar, summer kitchen, smoke house, and well. This German farm belonged to the Hyser family for many years although title search has revealed that the house was associated with the well-known Nedrow family of Philadelphia. According to local tradition, the house contains vats that were used for the dyeing of uniforms during the Revolutionary War. The homestead is primarily significant for its excellent eighteenth century masonry and architecture and for the outstanding condition in which it remains today.
- John Umstadt House, on Township Line Road, Evansburg, is a well-preserved example of eighteenth century architecture and is important for its association with famous families in the area of Evansburg. Umstat received the land from Mathias Van Bebber, who was granted it by William Penn in 1702.
- Ann E. Casselberry House and Barn are located on Evansburg Road, north of the Germantown Pike. The house, built between 1798 and 1804, was sold to Ann E. Casselberry who vacated the adjacent Derrick Casselberry House to live in the new one after the death of her husband. The stone masonry of the house is notable as is the handsome barn on the property. Both are good examples of late eighteenth, early nineteenth century architecture. The property is still owned by the Casselberry family in the name of Anna Casselberry.
- Paul Engle House is located on the bank of the Skippack Creek at 36 Evansburg Road, Evansburg. By the time of Paul Engle's death in 1795, the farm was well-established. In the deed received by Daniel Rees in 1795, mention of water rights indicated the importance of the Skippack Creek in the economic and technological development of the area.
- Society for the Propagation of the Gospel School House (today the St. James Community Center) is situated on the northeast corner of Evansburg Road and the Germantown Pike. The small, stone-plastered building which predates 1792 was remodeled to resemble the St. James Church, Perkiomen of 1721. The building is surrounded by gravesites of Revolutionary War soldiers buried after the Battle of Germantown and colonists' graves found there date from as early as 1723. Paul Engle willed money to the school to aid in the education of poor children—an unusual practice for the time. In 1838 the school was leased as a public school and may have been one of the first such schools in the nation. Other uses to which the building has been put include the housing of a printing press used in the production of an early English translation of the Bible, as well as serving as a mortuary, chapel and a library. The building today houses the Evansburg Free Library.
- St. James Church, Perkiomen, located at 3768 Germantown Pike, was one of the founding churches of the Episcopal Church in America. The original stone church was erected in a cemetery in 1721, but a log structure may have occupied the property as early as 1708. In 1843 the present church was built utilizing the stones and perhaps the two windows on the facade from the old building which was torn down to make room for the expansion of the cemetery. The original datestone of the 1721 church is set in the facade of the present one and the initials of the Church wardens of the time are easily legible. According to Professor Anthony N. E. Garvan of the University of Pennsylvania, the plastered stone church represents "a very moderate and conservative adaptation of the Gothic revival in the facade and the Oxford Movement in interior furnishings." The St. James Church, Perkiomen is an example, in excellent condition, of a rural 19th century place of worship.
- Funkite Cemetery located south of the Germantown Pike on a hill across from the Skippack Creek Road, serves as a memorial to Mennonite Minister Christian Funk, excommunicated from his church in 1777 for his advocacy of payment of the Revolutionary War tax. The Mennonites are a pacifist sect, but Funk argued that suppression of the colonial revolt by the British might jeopardize the religious freedom which the Mennonites had migrated to America to find. He viewed payment of the tax as incumbent upon Mennonites who valued a reconciliation after they were driven from the church, but neither side would compromise its deeply held beliefs. By 1850, the last of the Funkites had died out. The cemetery contains 32 markers, the earliest dating from 1815. Although the land is overgrown, the stones remain in excellent condition.
- Glebe House, 3814 Germantown Pike, part of which dates 1737, is significant for the role it played before and after the Battle of Germantown in September 1777. The term Glebe House first appears in 1764 when the building is described as "the Glebe House belonging to ye Society's Mission of Radnor and Perquihoma." The term Glebe refers to a farm on which the minister raised his own food so as to be self-supporting. On September 20, 1777, the 3-story plastered stone house (the present day rectory of St. James Church) was the scene of a war council of Washington's troops/ Local historians assert that soldiers were quartered there after the battle. The building is representative of 18th century country architecture — typical of the early English builders of Evansburg. It is also important as one of the earliest Glebe Houses and farms in the Anglican Church in America still standing.
- Samuel D. Shupe House, 136 Evansburg Road, was the home of a Philadelphia merchant. This two-story plastered stone house was built in the early 1840s and serves as an excellent example of mid-nineteenth century architecture of this region of Montgomery County.
- Isaac Mester House, 138 Evansburg Road, is a two-story, two bedroom plastered fieldstone house with end chimneys. The home was built in 1869 by Mester on land that at one time belonged to St. James Church. The home is an excellent example of mid-nineteenth century architecture of this region of Montgomery County.
- George Coulter House, located along Germantown Pike, is another example of early nineteenth century architecture in Montgomery County. This home, built by Coulter in 1817, is a two-story plastered fieldstone farmhouse with two end chimneys and a pent roof.
- Stephen Rush House, located at 3851 Germantown Pike, is a two-story fieldstone structure that served as a center of food and drink to travelers along Germantown Pike. This Inn was built about 1803 on land purchased from St. James Church.
- Evansburg Inn, located at 3833 Germantown Pike, is a large, two-story plastered fieldstone inn with end chimneys. The inn was built between 1803 and 1806 by Jacob Fronefield. Fronefield later sold the inn to George Hocker, a "yeoman" from Whitemarsh. Several owners later the property was purchased by Stephen Rush. Rush also owned an additional inn along the Germantown Pike. Rush was a descendant of Dr. Benjamin Rush, a signer of the Declaration of Independence and the father of American psychiatry.
- John Keyser House, located at 3847 Germantown Pike, is a two-story plastered fieldstone structure with end chimneys. Its architecture is similar to many other early homes in this region of Montgomery County. This structure was built by John Keyser between 1799 and 1804. A blacksmith shop was located to the rear of the house and was always busy due to its proximity to the Reading–Philadelphia Turnpike. The property was later owned by Ephraim Boyer, a member of the Boyer family that founded Boyertown. The house was also owned by Henry K. Boyer, an attorney and one-time Speaker of the House for the Commonwealth of Pennsylvania.
- Owen Evans House, located at 3856 Germantown Pike, is a two-story plastered fieldstone structure that has been modernized somewhat. The structure was built by Owen Evans between 1784 and 1805. Evans was one of the most famous gunmakers in the United States. In 1797 he received a contract from Governor Mifflin and the Commonwealth of Pennsylvania for 1,200 guns. These arms were used in the War of 1812.
- Changing House, located on the east bank of the Skippack Creek, is a country version of a Philadelphia town house. It is constructed of plastered fieldstone with the central door flanked by two windows and three windows on the second floor. Samuel bard, a Welsh stonemason, built the house on land purchased in 1811. The house was sold in 1832 to the First Regular Baptist Church for use as their first church and baptismal "changing house." The Changing House was used until 1912 when a modern pool was constructed some distance from the stream.
- Keyser's Mill, located on Skippack Creek Road and Germantown Pike, is a four-story structure located adjacent to the Creek. The building is constructed of plastered fieldstone and fenestration consists of rows of three windows. The gable end faces the Skippack Creek Road. The earliest legal mention of the mill was in 1849 when Daniel Croll granted the grist mill to Jacob and Philip Croll. Prior to its purchase for the Evansburg State Park, the property belonged to Byron Keyser. The mill is important because it is larger than the typical two-story mill of the eighteenth century. This mill is the last of the water-powered mills in the area.
- Peter Williams Tavern, located on Germantown Pike at Skippack Creek, is a three-story plastered stone structure. Fenestration consists of three windows across the two upper floors and two windows and an entrance door placed to the right on the first floor. In the fashion of Philadelphia houses there are no first or second story windows on the side, only one small attic window placed off center. This house is said to be the place in which the planning for the Skippack Bridge took place in 1792. Williams acquired the property in 1790 from Mary Bramwell.
- Skippack Bridge, already listed on the National Register of Historic Places, is an eight-arch stone bridge that was built in 1792 to cross the Skippack Creek on Germantown Pike in Lower Providence Township. The thirty-three foot wide bridge has carried traffic since its completion in 1792. The original datestone reads, "Skippack Bridge, 1792," and bears the names of Mathew Potts, John Mann and Conrad Boyer. The bridge was repaired in 1874 and a second datestone bears among others the name of John Stevens, one of the commissioners. The bridge was funded by monies of which at least a part was collected by lottery in 1762. During the February term, 1792, a court-appointed six man jury was instructed to lay out a road and a bridge easily accessible from either the present Manatawny Road or Germantown Pike and the Norristown Road. One of the points of reference used in surveying the bridge was the Peter Williams Tavern which also became the location for the various board meetings during the construction period.

== Other notable structures ==
- Doctors Grigg House, thought to be constructed prior to 1813 by Jacob Fronefield, Blacksmith, who built many houses in Evansburg. He received the land between Germantown Pike and Old Baptist Church Road from Lewis Schrack in 1806 and sold the messuage in 1813 to Joseph Henry, Merchant, with the right of Daniel Croll to dig a tail race across the property. From 1842 and for nearly half a century, the stone house belonged to Dr. John Ryland Grigg, professor at the nearby Pennsylvania Female College, and his son, Dr. Jacob Grigg. Located at 3764 Germantown Pike, it is still maintained as a private residence.
- Jacob Zollers House, constructed around 1844. Zollers was responsible for much of the stonework done in Evansburg.
- Evansburg Methodist Church and the Church House, built some time prior to 1842, perhaps by George Coulter and was sold to trustees of the church in 1842
- Abraham Harman House is a typical example of 19th-century stone masonry in the planned village of Evansburg. Located at 3865 Germantown Pike, it was sold by Abraham Harman to David Munshower in 1839.
- Christian Dull House of square German styling, built late in the 18th century at 3861 Germantown Pike, is claimed significant because of early commercial activities, including a wheelwright shop and store.
- Christian Rekup House, used by William Casselberry as a residence and woodworking shop in 1856, was built in the late 18th century and once owned, in 1797, by Nicholas Custer. Rekup was an early Dutch landowner in Evansburg.
- Edward Evans House, built in 1806 on land partially purchased from St. James Church at 3845 Germantown Pike, was built by Edward Evans as a 2 1/2-story stucco house in two sections. It contains a gabled roof, exterior brick chimney, and frame shed.
- Samuel D. Patterson Jr. House, built around 1856, originally had a mansard roof but was altered to give an English appearance. The land for the house was received by Patterson from Isaac Christman, keeper of the Evansburg Inn, in 1855.
- Keyser Storehouse is a Victorian adaptation of an English house with the addition of a large front dormer. It was built circa 1867 and is a duplicate of Isaac Casselberry's later home in the east.
- Vandersloot House, one of two residences across from the Evansburg Inn, was built by a Vandersloot before 1877 on Germantown Pike. The property was sold to Edward Green in 1899 and is currently maintained as a private residence.
- Weber House contains similar architecture as the Vandersloot House, built in the latter part of the 19th century. The home belonged to John Fulton, farmer in 1805, whose property is called a plantation.
- Abraham Everhart House was built on the Glebe property around 1844 and, although in poor condition, continues to be used as a residence.
- William Casselberry House was built on Germantown Pike around 1872. Comparable to the A. Everhart Casselberry stone house, it was built on Glebe lands by Abraham Everhart between 1844 and 1857.
- Daniel Croll Farm, built before 1835, with the house belonging to the gunsmith Daniel Croll. The property was described as 57 acres with a small stream. The land was highly cultivated and included a tenant house, barn, stable, mills, an orchard, and a springhouse. Roll had acquired the land from fellow Funkite Christian Gorwals in 1800. In 1835, Adam Slemmer described the property as situated 24 miles from Philadelphia, containing 67 acres of land, about 5 acres of excellent meadow, and a small stream passing through the same. The land is in a high state of cultivation, conveniently divided into fields and all under good fence. The improvements are a large two-story house with three rooms on each floor, a tenant house on the premises, a large barn stone stable high, the remainder frame, grist and plaster mill, an excellent apple orchard, and never failing spring water with a stone spring house over it.
- Four Funkite Houses on the corners of Germantown Pike and Grange Avenue. Two homes were built prior to 1811, the third had been the Funk store with mansard roof, and the other was the Abraham Funk house. The two dwellings built before 1811 are listed on the southern side of Germantown Pike and 1811 is the date Abraham and Anna Funk granted the messuage and store to Christian Rosenberry.
- Samuel Bard House, currently owned by Evansburg State Park on Old Baptist Road, was built in 1832 by stonemason Samuel Bard and modeled after a Philadelphia row home with two windows on the second floor above the central door and a third single window. The house was sold to Andrew Dewees in 1824 and the barn was burned in 1969. Samuel Bard built the stone house on the west bank of the Skippack in 1832 before turning over his former home across the creek to the Baptist Church for its changing house. Bard has purchased the land from Henry Loucks, a lawyer, in 1831, and sold it with a messuage in 1834 to Abraham Dewiest.
- Letitia Penn House, again following the Philadelphia style row home prototype, was built around 1813 as the little house in the Welsh Baptist community. The earliest south wing, built around 1820, is similar to the Leticia Penn house, has interior single room, and a large fireplace. The middle section duplicates the Changing House with central hall, while the northern addition follows the German architectural style of the northern Skippack Valley.
- Jesse Bean, Jr. House, built by a carpenter before 1877 on Evansburg Road and once covered with slate.
- Fry Family House, constructed circa 1877, belonged to the Fry family and is still maintained as a residence in relatively poor condition.
- Jacob Cope House, a blacksmith shop on Grange Avenue, was constructed circa 1785. It is the house which Catharine Haines, daughter of Dorothea Cope, who had married into that well-known Germantown family, conveyed in 1785 to her relative Jacob Cope. It is currently the Forge Antiques Shop.
- Samuel and Benjamin Nutter House, built around 1835 and bought by tobacconist Samuel Nutter of Philadelphia in 1855 and sold to Benjamin Nutter a year later. It is speculated that its sale four years later for less money indicated a possible failure of an early attempt to grow tobacco in the Skippack Valley.
- George Evans House, erected before 1854 on Grange Avenue, is listed as a good example of a Federal style house
- William Rhoades House, built sometime after 1835 on the northwest corner of Grange Avenue and Ridge Pike, was purchased from William Pennick by William Rhoades and his wife Elizabeth. The house, typical of many Ridge Avenue homes in Eagleville, represents the later architectural and community development of the Welsh Baptists.
- Christian Rosenberry Home, located on Grange Avenue, built in the late 18th century, is the home of a successful Funkite and Constable of Lower Providence Township.

== See also ==
- Kuster Mill
- Warren Z. Cole House
- National Register of Historic Places listings in Montgomery County, Pennsylvania
