= Skippack =

Skippack may refer to the following in the U.S. state of Pennsylvania

- Skippack Township, Pennsylvania
  - Skippack, Pennsylvania, a census-designated place in the above township
- Skippack Bridge, a stone arch bridge in Montgomery County
- Skippack Creek, a tributary of Perkiomen Creek
- Skippack Pike, a historical section of Pennsylvania Route 73
