= Methacton High School =

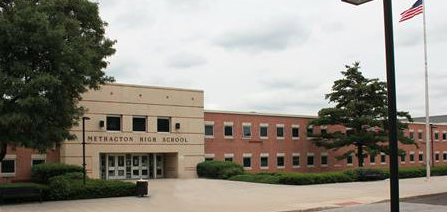

Location
- 1005 Kriebel Mill Road; Fairview Village, Pennsylvania 19403; United States; 40°10′33″N 75°23′51″W

Information
- Type: Public high school
- Motto: Learn, Lead, Succeed- Together!
- Established: 1961; 65 years ago
- School district: Methacton School District
- Principal: Deb Euker
- Teaching staff: 107.0 (FTE) (2018–19)
- Grades: 9–12
- Gender: Co-educational
- Enrollment: 1,757 (2018–19)
- Student to teacher ratio: 14.5:1 (2018–19)
- Campus type: Suburban
- Colors: Green and White
- Mascot: Warriors
- Newspaper: The Windy Hill
- Yearbook: The Methactonian
- Budget: US$101.5 million
- Website: highschool.methacton.org

Methacton High School (MHS) is a public high school located in the Fairview Village area, in Worcester Township, Montgomery County, Pennsylvania, in the Philadelphia metropolitan area. A part of the Methacton School District, it serves students in grades 9–12 from Worcester and Lower Providence townships (including the census-designated places of Audubon, Eagleville and Trooper). The school's mascot is a Native American warrior, and its colors are green and white. The school has approximately 1,757 students and 183 faculty. The current principal is Deb Euker.

== History ==
The first thing accomplished as the two districts merged was the opening of the Lower Providence-Worcester Joint Junior-Senior High School in 1961. The school was later named Methacton, and graduated its first class in 1964. The origin of the school's name is believed to be an American Indian term for "windy hill."

Vincent Farina, the man for whom the administration building is named, served as the first principal of the joint junior-senior high school. After serving as the second Supervising Principal of the Lower Providence-Worcester Joint School System in 1962–63, he was later named the superintendent of the Methacton School District, a capacity he continued in until his retirement in 1977.

== Academics ==
Individualized schedules are provided to all students that reflect a strong core curriculum with the flexibility to explore various academic and personal interests. Extensive technology applications include state of the art computer labs, Internet access throughout the building and a full range of computer based curricular offerings. The library houses over 32,000 volumes as well as access to various electronic media. A complete telecommunications studio provides daily student broadcasts integrated with courses designed to prepare students for the twenty-first century. The Counseling staff offers a full range of services to students and parents from college and career planning to individual counseling needs.

Methacton High School was ranked #14 out of 689 public high schools in Pennsylvania by SAT score in 2012.

=== Advanced Placement ===
The high school currently offers 24 AP courses:

- AP Art History
- AP Biology
- AP Calculus (AB & BC)
- AP Capstone Seminar and Research
- AP Chemistry
- AP Computer Science A
- AP Computer Science Principles
- AP English Language
- AP English Literature
- AP Environmental Science
- AP European History
- AP Human Geography
- AP Music Theory
- AP Physics C: Mechanics
- AP Psychology
- AP Spanish Language & Culture
- AP Statistics
- AP Studio Art (2-D, 3-D, & Drawing)
- AP U.S. Government
- AP U.S. History

The high school recently released that it would be adding AP Capstone, one of approximately 1,000 schools worldwide to implement AP Capstone, in addition to AP Computer Science Principles, for the 2017–2018 school year.

== Athletics ==
Methacton is a Pennsylvania Interscholastic Athletic Association (PIAA) District 1 member. Boys sports include: Baseball, Basketball, Cross Country, Football, Golf, Indoor and Outdoor Track and Field, Lacrosse, Soccer, Swimming and Diving, Tennis, and Wrestling. Girls sports include: Basketball, Cross Country, Field Hockey, Golf, Indoor and Outdoor Track and Field, Lacrosse, Soccer, Softball, Swimming and Diving, and Volleyball.

Enrollment for sports in 2013 totaled 1,271 students.

== Notable alumni ==
- Courtney Friel, KTLA news reporter in Los Angeles
- Elin Hilderbrand, romance novelist, The Five-Star Weekend
- Jennifer L. Holm, Newbery Medal-winning author, Boston Jane
- Ryann Krais, gold and bronze medalist the 2007 World Youth Championships in Athletics (track and field)
- Morgan Turner, actress, plays Martha in Jumanji: Welcome to the Jungle
- Eric Wareheim, co-creator, writer, and star of Tim and Eric Awesome Show, Great Job! and Tom Goes to the Mayor
- Robbie Wine, professional baseball player for the Houston Astros (1987–1988) and the head coach at Penn State University (2004–2013)
