= Fairview Village, Pennsylvania =

Unincorporated community in Pennsylvania, US

- Unincorporated community
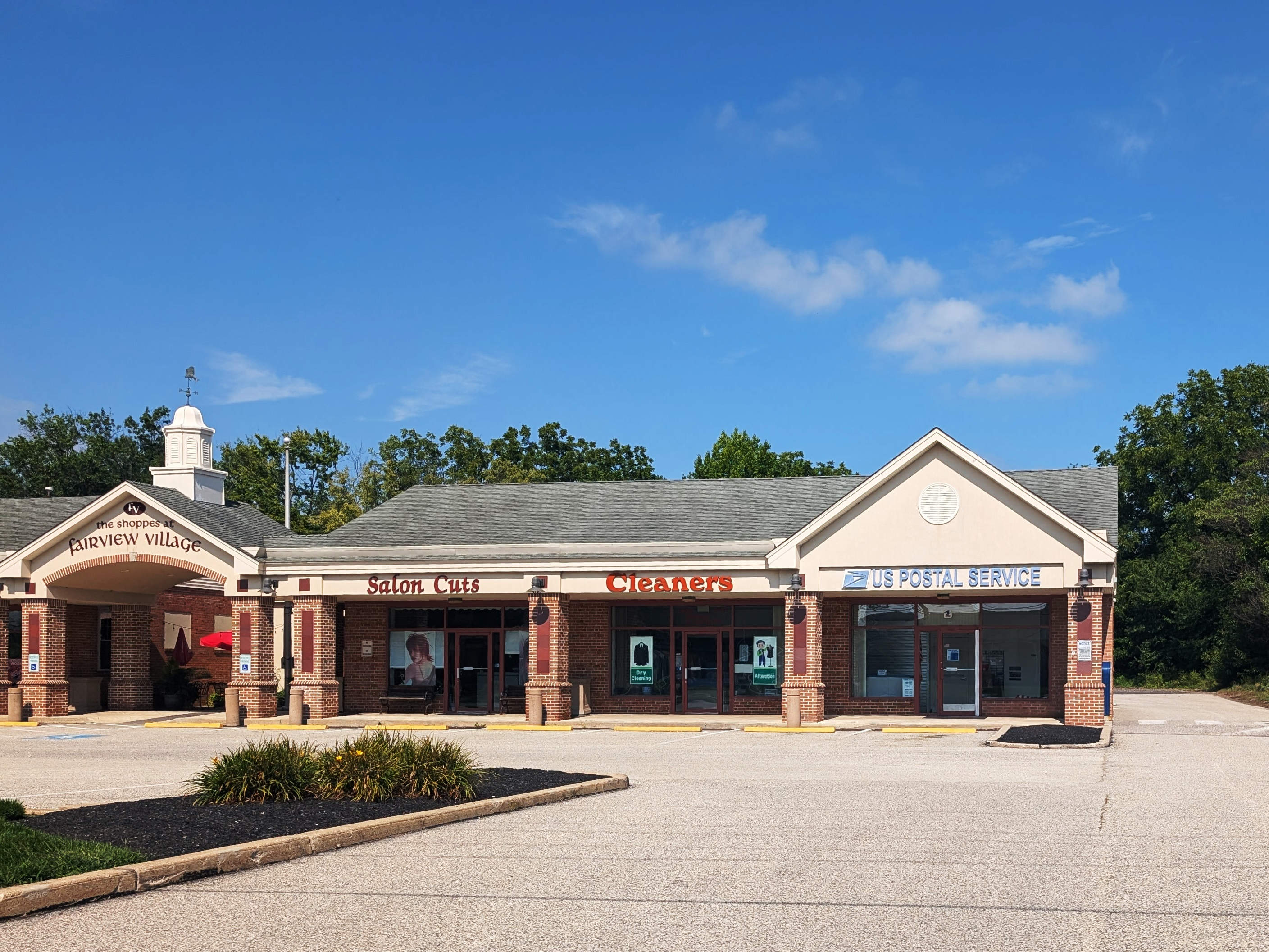
- Shopping center and post office in Fairview Village

- Location within Pennsylvania
- Coordinates: 40°9′28″N 75°23′14″W
- Country: United States
- State: Pennsylvania
- County: Montgomery
- Township: Worcester
- Elevation: 440 ft (130 m)
- Time zone: UTC-5 (Eastern (EST))
  - Summer (DST): UTC-4 (EDT)
- ZIP code: 19409
- Area codes: 610 and 484
- GNIS feature ID: 1174552

Fairview Village is an unincorporated community in Worcester Township in Montgomery County, Pennsylvania, United States. Fairview Village is located at the intersection of Pennsylvania Route 363 and Germantown Pike.

== Education ==
Methacton School District serves the area. Methacton High School is in the area.
