= Evansburg =

Evansburg may refer to:

- Evansburg, Pennsylvania
- Evansburg, Alberta
  - Evansburg railway station
