= Lower Providence Township, Pennsylvania =

Township in Pennsylvania, US

Lower Providence Township
- Township
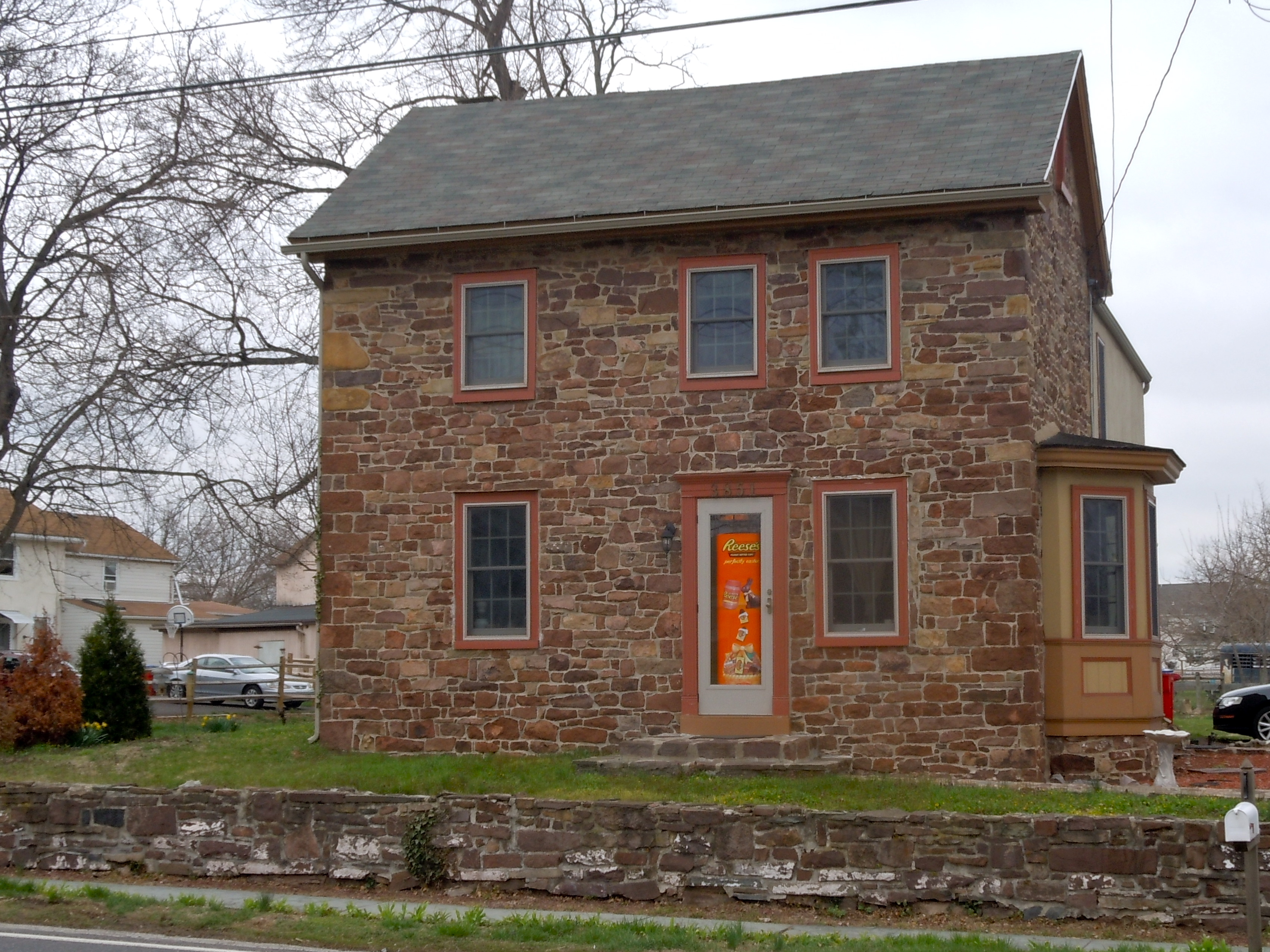
- Evansburg Historic District

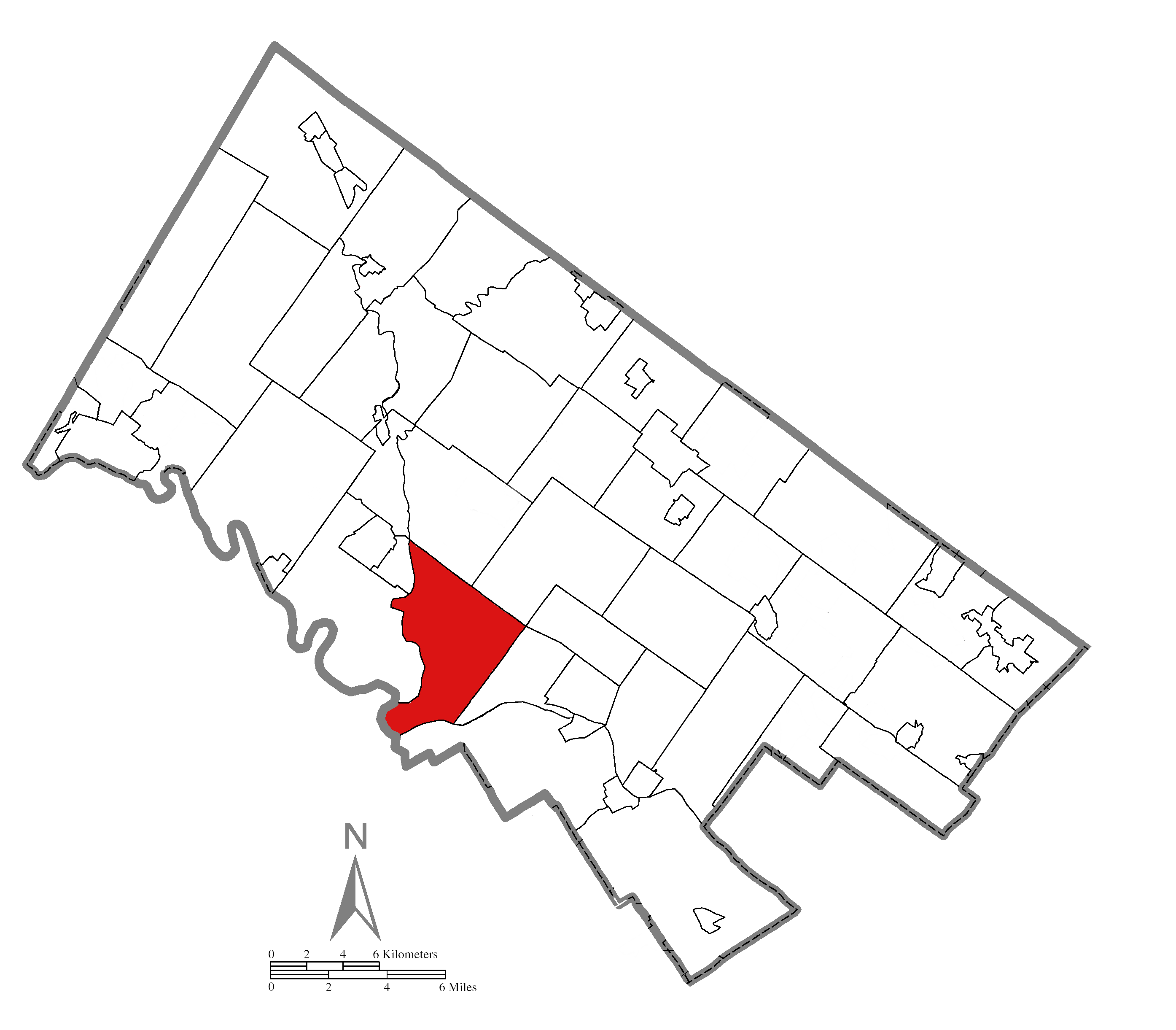
- Location of Lower Providence Township in Montgomery County, Pennsylvania

- Location of Montgomery County in Pennsylvania
- Coordinates: 40°09′01″N 75°25′05″W
- Country: United States
- State: Pennsylvania
- County: Montgomery
- Established: 1805

Area
  - Total: 15.46 sq mi (40.03 km^{2})
  - Land: 15.25 sq mi (39.49 km^{2})
  - Water: 0.21 sq mi (0.54 km^{2})
- Elevation: 354 ft (108 m)

Population (2020)
  - Total: 25,625
  - Density: 1,745.7/sq mi (674.02/km^{2})
- Time zone: UTC-5 (EST)
  - Summer (DST): UTC-4 (EDT)
- Area code: 610
- FIPS code: 42-091-45080
- Website: www.lowerprovidence.org

Lower Providence Township is a township in Montgomery County, Pennsylvania, United States. The township is located approximately 17 miles northwest of Philadelphia. The population was 25,625 at the 2020 census.

== History ==
Lower Providence Township was established in 1805 by the division of the former Providence Township into Upper and Lower Providence along the Perkiomen Creek.

Lower Providence is part of the historic homeland of the Lenape people, called the Delaware Indians by early European settlers.

It was part of a large tract of land, which was granted to William Penn, the founder and first governor of the colonial-era Province of Pennsylvania.

Skippack Bridge, built in 1792 in the township, was listed on the National Register of Historic Places in 1970.

== Geography ==
According to the U.S. Census Bureau, the township has a total area of 15.6 square miles (40.3 km^{2}), of which 15.4 square miles (39.8 km^{2}) is land and 0.2 square miles (0.5 km^{2}) (1.29%) is water. It contains the census-designated places of Audubon and Evansburg.

Lower Providence Township includes a portion of Valley Forge National Historical Park and Evansburg State Park. Evansburg State Park provides for a multitude of recreational opportunities such as horseback riding, hiking, picnicking, biking, fishing and hunting. Mill Grove, the first home in America of the painter John James Audubon, is maintained as a museum and wildlife sanctuary by Montgomery County.

=== Neighboring municipalities ===
- Upper Providence Township (west)
- Borough of Collegeville (northwest)
- Perkiomen Township (tangent to the northwest)
- Skippack Township (north)
- Worcester Township (northeast)
- East Norriton Township (tangent to the northeast)
- West Norriton Township (east)
- Upper Merion Township (south)
- Schuylkill Township, Chester County (southwest)

=== Nearby places of interest ===
- Phoenixville
- King of Prussia
- Norristown
- Valley Forge

== Demographics ==
Historical population
| Census | Pop. | Note | %± |
|---|---|---|---|
| 1930 | 3,189 | | — |
| 1940 | 3,822 | | 19.8% |
| 1950 | 5,887 | | 54.0% |
| 1960 | 9,955 | | 69.1% |
| 1970 | 15,169 | | 52.4% |
| 1980 | 18,945 | | 24.9% |
| 1990 | 19,351 | | 2.1% |
| 2000 | 22,893 | | 18.3% |
| 2010 | 25,436 | | 11.1% |
| 2020 | 25,625 | | 0.7% |

At the 2010 census, the township was 81.0% White, 7.1% Black or African American, 0.1% Native American, 9.7% Asian, and 1.3% were two or more races. 2.9% of the population were of Hispanic or Latino ancestry.

At the 2000 census, there were 22,390 people, 7,446 households and 5,606 families residing in the township. The population density was 1,458.8 inhabitants per square mile (563.2/km^{2}). There were 7,690 housing units at an average density of 501.0 per square mile (193.4/km^{2}). The racial makeup of the township was 86.26% White, 7.25% African American, 0.11% Native American, 4.67% Asian, 0.07% Pacific Islander, 1.04% from other races, and 0.61% from two or more races. Hispanic or Latino of any race were 2.10% of the population.

There were 7,446 households, of which 38.1% had children under the age of 18 living with them, 64.0% were married couples living together, 8.0% had a female householder with no husband present, and 24.7% were non-families. 19.7% of all households were made up of individuals, and 6.2% had someone living alone who was 65 years of age or older. The average household size was 2.75 and the average family size was 3.21.

26.0% of the population were under the age of 18, 7.0% from 18 to 24, 33.7% from 25 to 44, 23.4% from 45 to 64, and 9.9% who were 65 years of age or older. The median age was 36 years. For every 100 females there were 112.1 males. For every 100 females age 18 and over, there were 112.3 males.

The median household income was $66,250 and the median family income was $74,902. Males had a median income of $47,489 compared with $35,896 for females. The per capita income for the township was $26,186. About 2.9% of families and 4.4% of the population were below the poverty line, including 4.9% of those under age 18 and 3.6% of those age 65 or over.

== Government ==
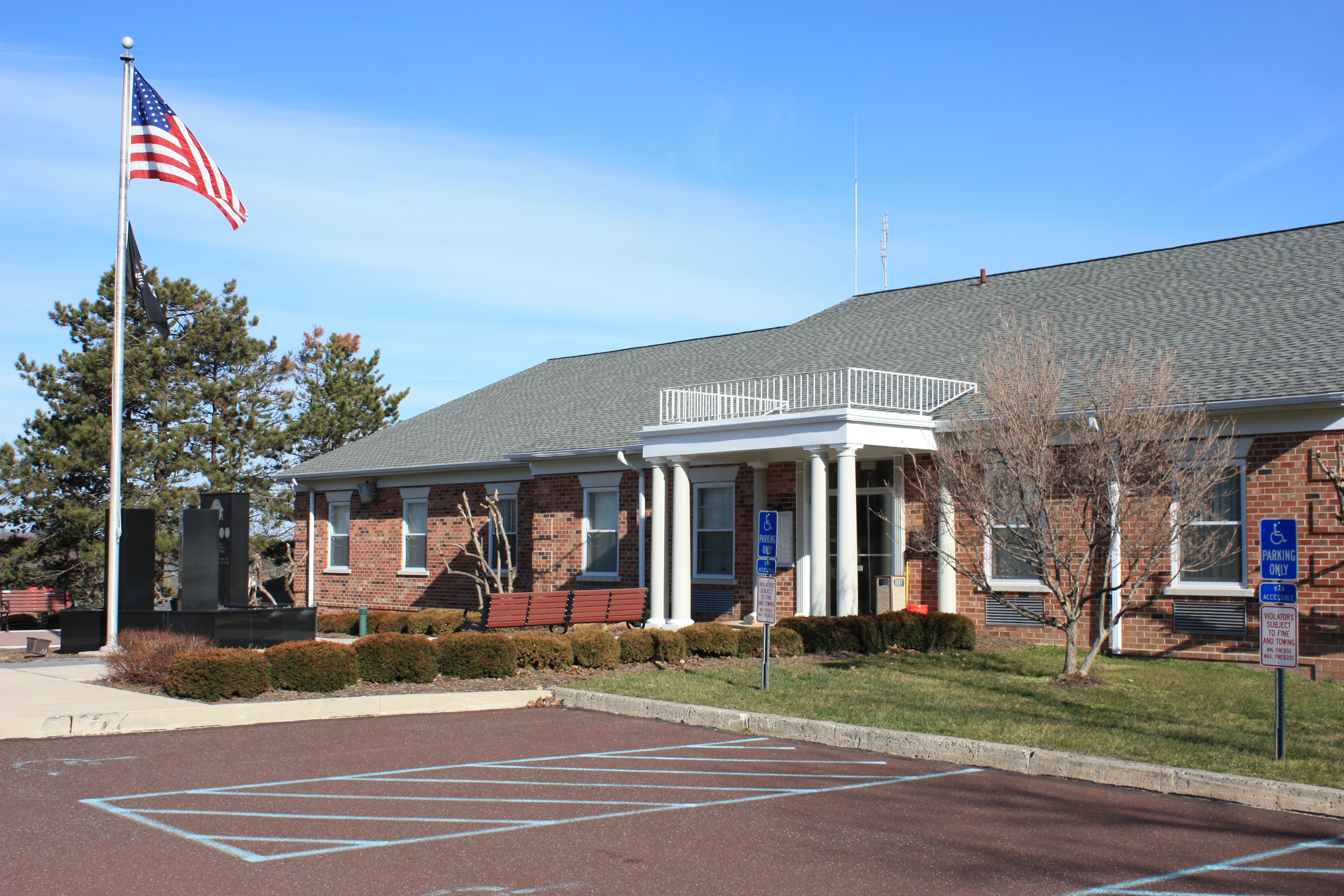
Lower Providence Township municipal building

Presidential elections results
| Year | Republican | Democratic |
|---|---|---|
| 2024 | 41.5% 6,359 | 57.4% 8,790 |
| 2020 | 40.4% 6,098 | 58.0% 8,749 |
| 2016 | 42.8% 5,449 | 52.4% 6,672 |
| 2012 | 48.2% 5,726 | 50.3% 5,974 |
| 2008 | 46.1% 5,592 | 53.2% 6,450 |
| 2004 | 49.6% 5,465 | 49.9% 5,489 |
| 2000 | 50.1% 4,239 | 47.3% 4,003 |
| 1996 | 44.5% 3,215 | 42.4% 3,065 |
| 1992 | 41.8% 3,291 | 35.5% 2,797 |

Lower Providence Township is a municipality that is governed as a Township of the Second Class with a Board of Supervisors consisting of five elected residents. The Board of Supervisors is responsible for the appointment of the Township Manager, who executes the policies of the Board of Supervisors. The Board of Supervisors also appoints all advisory and regulatory boards. The current township manager is Donald Delamater (effective November 21, 2016), and the assistant township manager is Geraldine M. Golas. The members of the Board of Supervisors are Peter MacFarland, Chair (term expires 2021), Colleen Eckman, Vice Chair (term expires 2021), Gary Neights (term expires 2023), Jason Sorgini (term expires 2023) and Cara Coless (term expires 2025).

=== County government ===
The Montgomery County Correctional Facility is in Eagleville in Lower Providence Township.

== Transportation ==
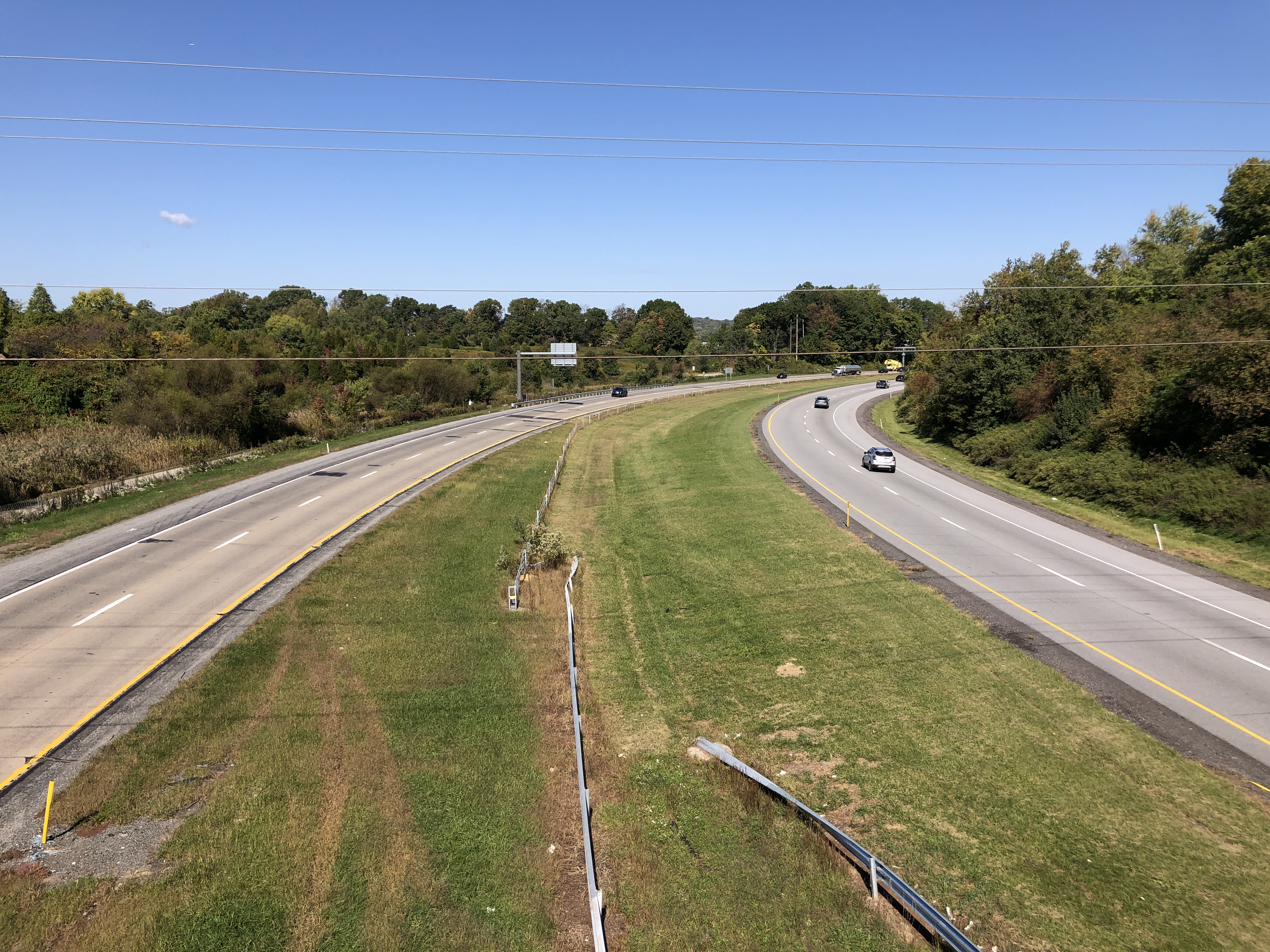
US Route 422 westbound in Lower Providence Township

As of 2019 there were 113.66 miles (182.92 km) of public roads in Lower Providence Township, of which 23.55 miles (37.90 km) were maintained by the Pennsylvania Department of Transportation (PennDOT) and 90.11 miles (145.02 km) were maintained by the township.

U.S. Route 422 is the main highway serving Lower Providence Township. It follows the Pottstown Expressway along an east-west alignment through the southern section of the township. Pennsylvania Route 363 provides local access, following Trooper Road northeast from US 422, then turning northwest along Ridge Pike before turning back to the northeast along Park Avenue.

SEPTA provides Suburban Bus service to Lower Providence Township along routes 91, 93, 99, and 131, connecting the township to the Norristown Transportation Center in Norristown and other suburbs.

== Education ==
Lower Providence Township is served by the Methacton School District. Three of the district's four elementary schools serve sections of the township: Arrowhead, Eagleville, and Woodland. Skyview Upper Elementary School, Arcola Intermediate School, and Methacton High School serve all parts of the district.

Woodland, Eagleville, and Arrowhead elementary schools; the Skyview Upper Elementary School and the Arcola Intermediate School are all located within the township. Methacton High School and Worcester Elementary School are located in Worcester Township.

The Roman Catholic Archdiocese of Philadelphia operates Visitation B.V.M. School in West Norriton Township, near but not in the Trooper census-designated place.

Lower Providence Community Library is in Eagleville.

== Notable people ==
- John James Audubon, 19th-century artist, ornithologist, and naturalist
- Joe Harvey, former professional baseball player, Colorado Rockies and New York Yankees
