= Trooper, Pennsylvania =

Unincorporated community in Pennsylvania, US

Trooper
- Census-designated place
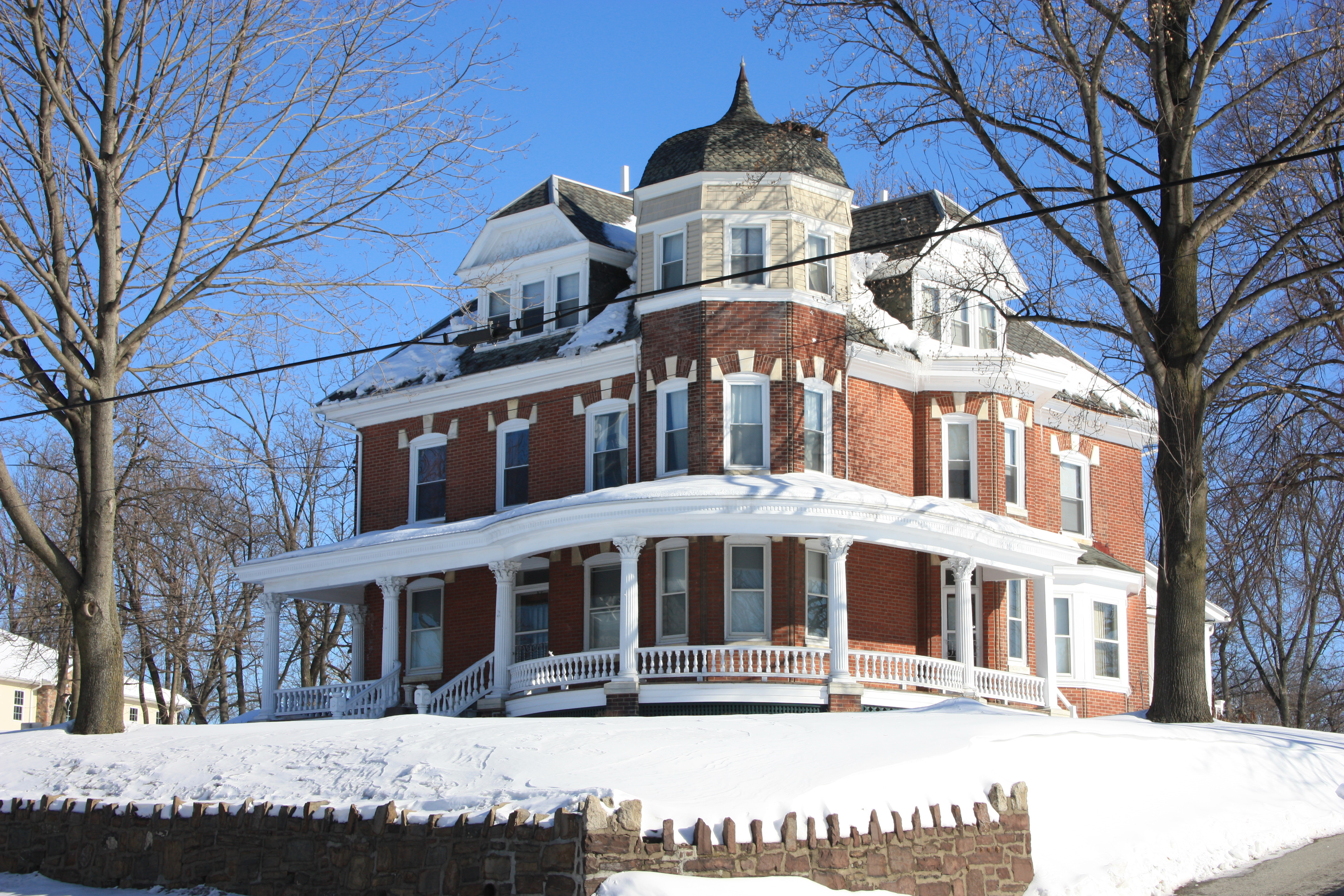
- Victorian house on Ridge Pike

- Location of Trooper in Pennsylvania Trooper (the United States)
- Coordinates: 40°08′56″N 75°23′50″W
- Country: United States
- State: Pennsylvania
- County: Montgomery
- Township: Lower Providence

Area
  - Total: 2.4 sq mi (6.2 km^{2})
  - Land: 2.4 sq mi (6.2 km^{2})
  - Water: 0.0 sq mi (0 km^{2})
- Elevation: 377 ft (115 m)

Population (2010)
  - Total: 5,744
  - Density: 2,400/sq mi (920/km^{2})
- Time zone: UTC-5 (EST)
  - Summer (DST): UTC-4 (EDT)
- ZIP code: 19403
- Area code: 610

Trooper is a census-designated place (CDP) in Lower Providence Township, Pennsylvania, United States. The population was 5,744 at the 2010 census.

== Geography ==
Trooper is located at 40°8′56″N 75°23′50″W (40.148845, -75.397170).

According to the United States Census Bureau, the CDP has a total area of 2.4 square miles (6.2 km^{2}), all land.

== Demographics ==
Historical population
Census	Pop.	Note	%±
1990	5,137		—
2000	6,061		18.0%
2010	5,744		−5.2%
2020	5,481		−4.6%

As of the 2010 census, the CDP was 86.9% Non-Hispanic White, 2.2% Black or African American, 0.1% Native American and Alaskan Native, 6.8% Asian, 1.0% were Some Other Race, and 1.0% were two or more races. 3.2% of the population were of Hispanic or Latino ancestry.

At the 2000 census there were 6,061 people, 2,056 households, and 1,655 families living in the CDP. The population density was 2,546.9 inhabitants per square mile (983.4/km^{2}). There were 2,107 housing units at an average density of 885.4 per square mile (341.9/km^{2}). The racial makeup of the CDP was 91.80% White, 1.30% African American, 0.23% Native American, 5.63% Asian, 0.18% from other races, and 0.86% from two or more races. Hispanic or Latino of any race were 1.47%.

There were 2,056 households, 42.1% had children under the age of 18 living with them, 70.0% were married couples living together, 6.8% had a female householder with no husband present, and 19.5% were non-families. 16.2% of households were made up of individuals, and 7.2% were one person aged 65 or older. The average household size was 2.95 and the average family size was 3.33.

The age distribution was 29.1% under the age of 18, 5.7% from 18 to 24, 30.5% from 25 to 44, 23.1% from 45 to 64, and 11.5% 65 or older. The median age was 38 years. For every 100 females, there were 98.2 males. For every 100 females age 18 and over, there were 95.2 males.

The median household income was $69,722 and the median family income was $74,154. Males had a median income of $52,263 versus $34,311 for females. The per capita income for the CDP was $27,268. About 3.3% of families and 3.9% of the population were below the poverty line, including 3.7% of those under age 18 and 4.2% of those age 65 or over.

== Education ==
The Methacton School District serves Trooper CDP. Portions of the Trooper CDP are served by Eagleville Elementary School in Eagleville, Woodland Elementary School, and Arrowhead Elementary School.

Skyview Upper Elementary School, Arcola Intermediate School, and Methacton High School serve all parts of the district. Skyview Upper and Arcola Intermediate are in Trooper CDP, and Methacton High is near the Eagleville CDP but not in it.

The Roman Catholic Archdiocese of Philadelphia operates Visitation B.V.M. School in West Norriton Township, near but not in the Trooper census-designated place.
