= Halfway House, Pennsylvania =

Unincorporated community in Pennsylvania, US

Halfway House
- Census-designated place
- Location of Halfway House in Pennsylvania Halfway House (the United States)
- Coordinates: 40°16′28″N 75°38′21″W
- Country: United States
- State: Pennsylvania
- County: Montgomery
- Township: Upper Pottsgrove

Area
  - Total: 2.10 sq mi (5.44 km^{2})
  - Land: 2.10 sq mi (5.44 km^{2})
  - Water: 0 sq mi (0.00 km^{2})
- Elevation: 384 ft (117 m)

Population (2020)
  - Total: 3,273
  - Density: 1,559.1/sq mi (601.96/km^{2})
- Time zone: UTC-5 (EST)
  - Summer (DST): UTC-4 (EDT)
- ZIP code: 19464
- Area codes: 610 & 484
- FIPS code: 42-32024

Halfway House is a census-designated place (CDP) in Montgomery County, Pennsylvania, United States. The population was 3,273 at the 2020 census.

== Geography ==
Halfway House is located at 40°16′28″N 75°38′21″W (40.274479, -75.639118). According to the United States Census Bureau, the CDP has a total area of 2.0 square miles (5.2 km^{2}), all land.

It is located north of Pottstown on Route 100 and is served by the Pottsgrove School District and the Pottstown post office with the zip code of 19464.

== Demographics ==
Historical population
Census	Pop.	Note	%±
1990	1,415		—
2000	1,823		28.8%
2010	2,881		58.0%
2020	3,273		13.6%

=== 2020 census ===
As of the 2020 census, Halfway House had a population of 3,273. The median age was 39.9 years. 23.9% of residents were under the age of 18 and 13.5% of residents were 65 years of age or older. For every 100 females there were 101.7 males, and for every 100 females age 18 and over there were 95.3 males age 18 and over.

98.1% of residents lived in urban areas, while 1.9% lived in rural areas.

There were 1,158 households in Halfway House, of which 36.4% had children under the age of 18 living in them. Of all households, 57.5% were married-couple households, 17.1% were households with a male householder and no spouse or partner present, and 19.2% were households with a female householder and no spouse or partner present. About 20.6% of all households were made up of individuals and 6.9% had someone living alone who was 65 years of age or older.

There were 1,197 housing units, of which 3.3% were vacant. The homeowner vacancy rate was 0.3% and the rental vacancy rate was 3.8%.

Racial composition as of the 2020 census
Race	Number	Percent
White	2,494	76.2%
Black or African American	377	11.5%
American Indian and Alaska Native	16	0.5%
Asian	105	3.2%
Native Hawaiian and Other Pacific Islander	1	0.0%
Some other race	50	1.5%
Two or more races	230	7.0%
Hispanic or Latino (of any race)	170	5.2%

=== 2010 census ===
As of the 2010 census, the CDP was 84.6% Non-Hispanic White, 8.1% Black or African American, 0.2% Native American and Alaskan Native, 2.8% Asian, 0.1% Native Hawaiian and Other Pacific Islander, 0.6% were Some Other Race, and 2.0% were two or more races. 2.8% of the population were of Hispanic or Latino ancestry.

=== 2000 census ===
At the 2000 census there were 1,823 people, 637 households, and 503 families living in the CDP. The population density was 913.2 inhabitants per square mile (352.6/km^{2}). There were 662 housing units at an average density of 331.6 per square mile (128.0/km^{2}). The racial makeup of the CDP was 94.24% White, 3.18% African American, 0.16% Native American, 1.37% Asian, 0.44% from other races, and 0.60% from two or more races. Hispanic or Latino of any race were 1.15%.

There were 637 households, 38.6% had children under the age of 18 living with them, 69.5% were married couples living together, 6.4% had a female householder with no husband present, and 20.9% were non-families. 15.7% of households were made up of individuals, and 6.6% were one person aged 65 or older. The average household size was 2.86 and the average family size was 3.24.

The age distribution was 28.3% under the age of 18, 6.5% from 18 to 24, 31.3% from 25 to 44, 22.7% from 45 to 64, and 11.3% 65 or older. The median age was 36 years. For every 100 females, there were 95.6 males. For every 100 females age 18 and over, there were 91.8 males.

The median household income was $56,369 and the median family income was $66,875. Males had a median income of $45,172 versus $31,402 for females. The per capita income for the CDP was $24,023. About 1.1% of families and 1.1% of the population were below the poverty line, including 1.4% of those under age 18 and none of those age 65 or over.

== Education ==
It is in the Pottsgrove School District.
