= Evansburg, Pennsylvania =

Unincorporated community in Pennsylvania, US

Evansburg
- Census-designated place
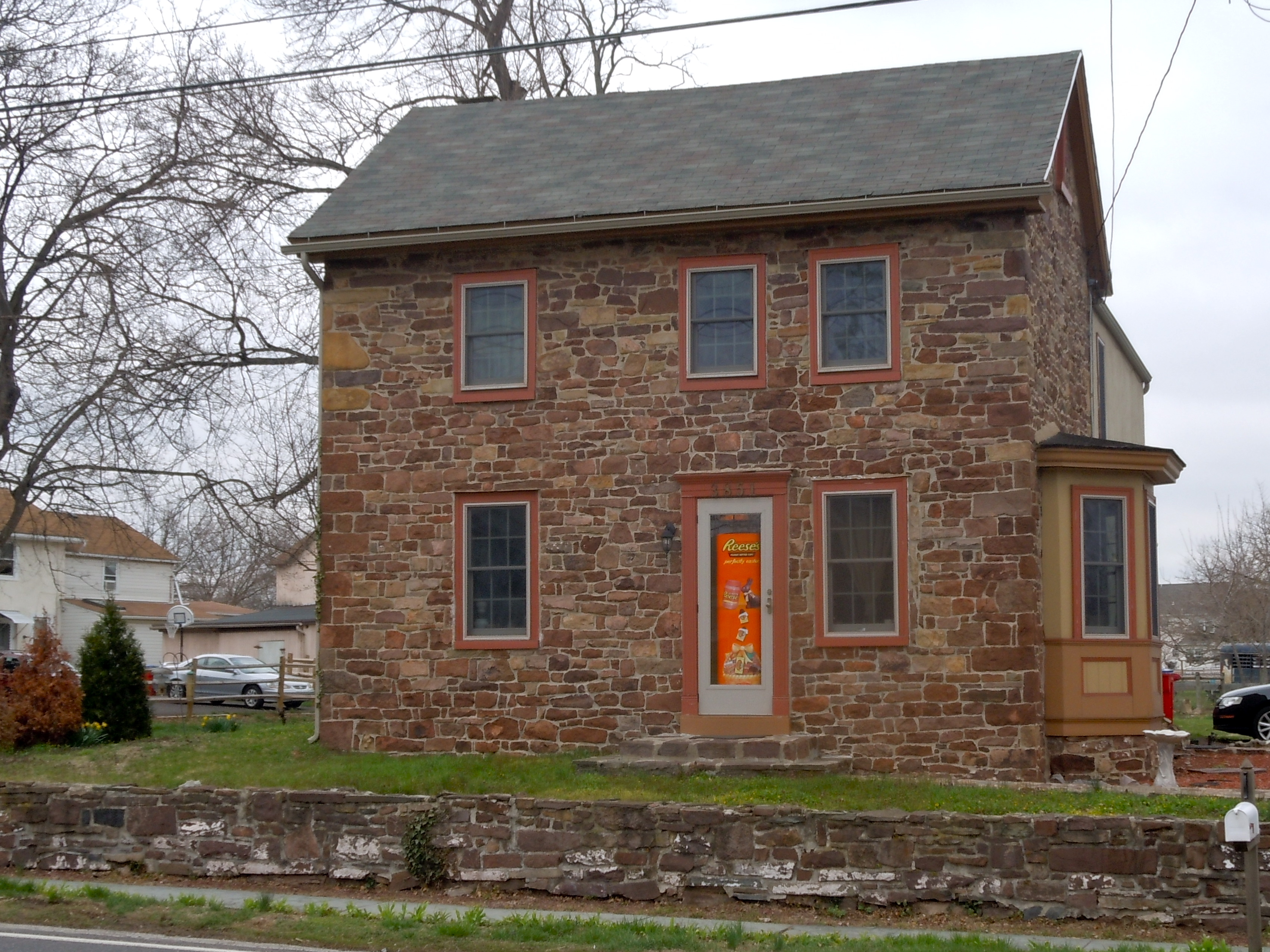
- House in Evansburg

- Location of Evansburg in Pennsylvania Evansburg (the United States)
- Coordinates: 40°11′20″N 75°26′0″W
- Country: United States
- State: Pennsylvania
- County: Montgomery
- Townships: Lower Providence, Skipppack

Area
  - Total: 1.61 sq mi (4.17 km^{2})
  - Land: 1.61 sq mi (4.17 km^{2})
  - Water: 0 sq mi (0.00 km^{2})
- Elevation: 203 ft (62 m)

Population (2020)
  - Total: 2,410
  - Density: 1,497.2/sq mi (578.09/km^{2})
- Time zone: UTC-5 (EST)
  - Summer (DST): UTC-4 (EDT)
- ZIP code: 19426
- Area code: 610
- FIPS code: 42-24240

Evansburg is a census-designated place (CDP) in Montgomery County, Pennsylvania, United States. The population was 2,129 at the 2010 census. The CDP, divided between Lower Providence Township and Skippack Township, is the namesake of Evansburg State Park.

== History ==
The Evansburg Historic District was listed on the National Register of Historic Places in 1972.

== Geography ==
According to the United States Census Bureau, the CDP has a total area of 1.5 square miles (3.9 km^{2}), all land. The nearby Evansburg State Park takes its name from the CDP.

Evansburg is a National Historic District designated by Congress, with over 50 National Register properties dating from the early 18th through 19th century. Almost all of these properties are privately owned and in active use at this time.

== Demographics ==
Historical population
Census	Pop.	Note	%±
1990	1,047		—
2000	1,536		46.7%
2010	2,129		38.6%
2020	2,410		13.2%

As of the 2010 census, the CDP was 80.7% White, 2.7% Black or African American, 0.1% Native American, 12.6% Asian, 0.3% were Some Other Race, and 1.5% were two or more races. 2.5% of the population were of Hispanic or Latino ancestry.

As of the census of 2000, there were 1,536 people, 588 households, and 422 families living in the CDP. The population density was 1,027.4 inhabitants per square mile (396.7/km^{2}). There were 615 housing units at an average density of 411.3 per square mile (158.8/km^{2}). The racial makeup of the CDP was 95.25% White, 0.78% African American, 0.13% Native American, 3.26% Asian, 0.26% from other races, and 0.33% from two or more races. Hispanic or Latino of any race were 1.43% of the population.

There were 588 households, out of which 33.8% had children under the age of 18 living with them, 58.2% were married couples living together, 10.0% had a female householder with no husband present, and 28.2% were non-families. 21.8% of all households were made up of individuals, and 3.2% had someone living alone who was 65 years of age or older. The average household size was 2.61 and the average family size was 3.10.

In the CDP, the population was spread out, with 25.7% under the age of 18, 5.1% from 18 to 24, 33.8% from 25 to 44, 25.8% from 45 to 64, and 9.6% who were 65 years of age or older. The median age was 38 years. For every 100 females, there were 96.7 males. For every 100 females age 18 and over, there were 93.4 males.

The median income for a household in the CDP was $68,708, and the median income for a family was $77,219. Males had a median income of $46,587 versus $41,938 for females. The per capita income for the CDP was $30,830. About 1.4% of families and 3.1% of the population were below the poverty line, including 4.8% of those under age 18 and none of those age 65 or over.

== Education ==
Portions of the CDP in Lower Providence Township are in the Methacton School District. Portions in Skippack Township are in the Perkiomen Valley School District.
