= Methacton School District =

School district in Pennsylvania, US

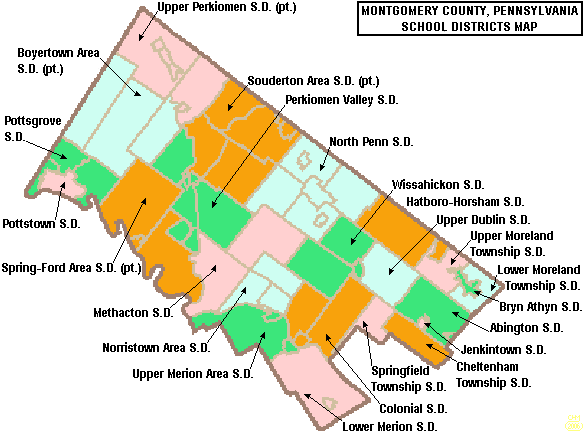
- Map of Montgomery County, Pennsylvania Public School Districts. Methacton School District is in pink in the center of the county.

Address
- 1001 Kriebel Mill Rd Eagleville, Pennsylvania, 19403; United States

District information
- Type: Public school district
- Motto: Learn, Lead, Succeed - Together!
- Grades: K-12
- Established: 1961
- Superintendent: Dr. David A. Zerbe

Other information
- Website: www.methacton.org

The Methacton School District (MSD) is a public school district located in Montgomery County, Pennsylvania, in the Philadelphia metropolitan area. It is headquartered in the Farina Education Center in Worcester Township.

== History and demographics ==
This school district includes residents in the townships of Lower Providence (including the census-designated places of Audubon, Eagleville and Trooper) and Worcester (including the area of Fairview Village). The district was created in 1961, as a consolidation of other school districts, with the merger process completed in 1969. The superintendent is Dr. David Zerbe. The name of the district is a word in a Native American language that refers to the area hill.

Seven schools comprise the district:

- Methacton High School (9th-12th grade)
- Arcola Intermediate School (7th and 8th grade)
- Skyview Upper Elementary School (5th and 6th grade)
- Arrowhead Elementary School (K-4th grade)
- Eagleville Elementary School (K-4th grade)
- Woodland Elementary School (K-4th grade)
- Worcester Elementary School (K-4th grade)

Audubon Elementary School was closed indefinitely in 2017.

== See also ==
- List of school districts in Pennsylvania
