= Eagleville, Montgomery County, Pennsylvania =

Unincorporated community in Pennsylvania, US

Eagleville
- Census-designated place
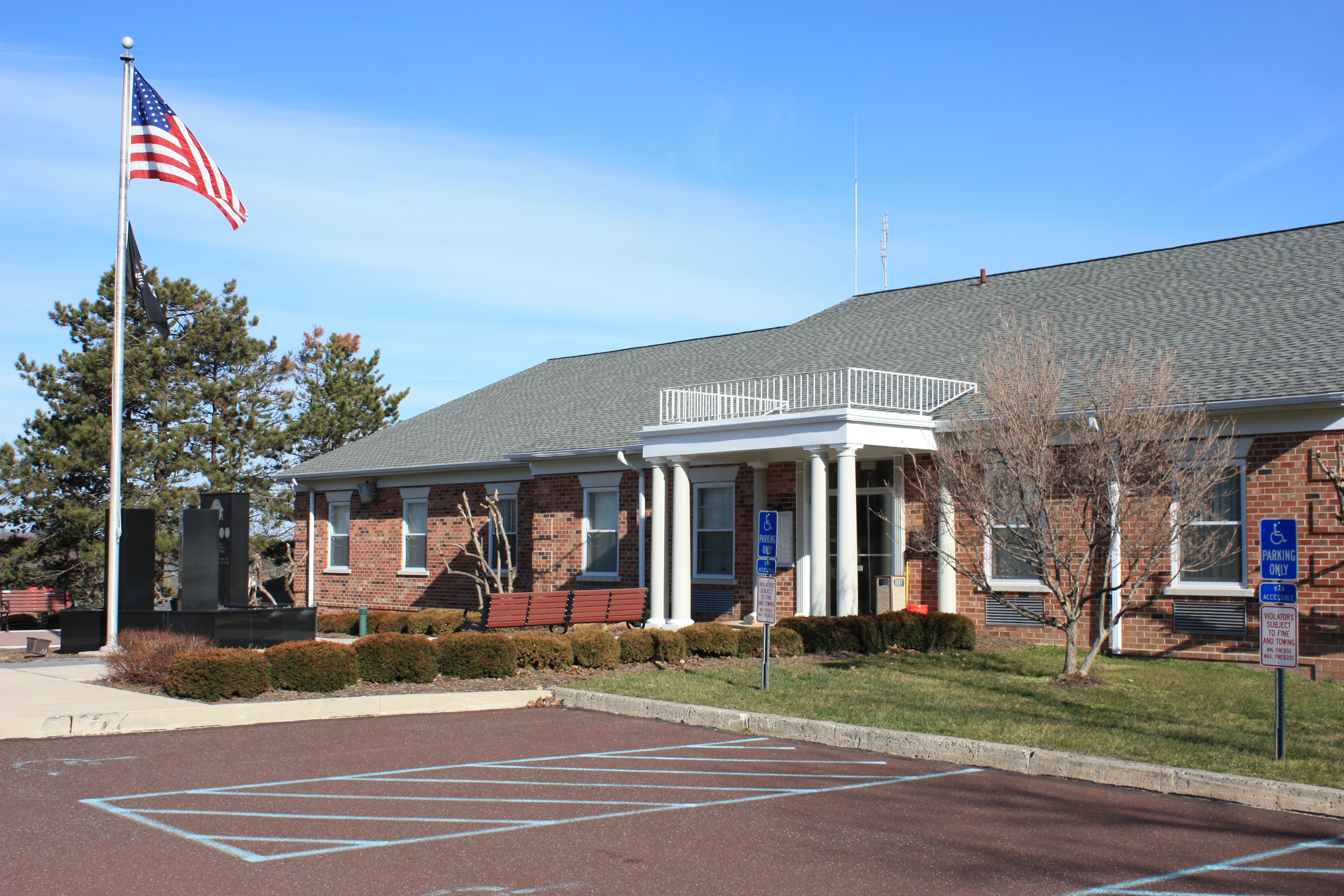

- Location of Eagleville in Pennsylvania Eagleville (the United States)
- Coordinates: 40°09′24″N 75°24′31″W
- Country: United States
- State: Pennsylvania
- County: Montgomery
- Township: Lower Providence

Area
  - Total: 1.6 sq mi (4.1 km^{2})
  - Land: 1.6 sq mi (4.1 km^{2})
  - Water: 0.0 sq mi (0 km^{2})
- Elevation: 433 ft (132 m)

Population (2010)
  - Total: 4,800
  - Density: 3,000/sq mi (1,200/km^{2})
- Time zone: UTC-5 (EST)
  - Summer (DST): UTC-4 (EDT)
- ZIP code: 19403
- Area codes: 610 and 484

Eagleville is a census-designated place (CDP) in Montgomery County, Pennsylvania, United States. The population was 4,800 at the 2010 census. It is within Lower Providence Township.

== Geography ==
Eagleville is located at 40°9′24″N 75°24′31″W (40.156640, -75.408569).

According to the United States Census Bureau, the CDP has a total area of 1.6 square miles (4.1 km^{2}), all land.

== Demographics ==
Historical population
Census	Pop.	Note	%±
1990	3,637		—
2000	4,458		22.6%
2010	4,800		7.7%

As of the 2010 census, the CDP was 66.6% White, 22.4% Black or African American, 0.1% Native American, 5.5% Asian, 1.4% were Some Other Race, and 1.8% were two or more races. 4.1% of the population were of Hispanic or Latino ancestry.

As of the census of 2000, there were 4,458 people, 1,091 households, and 737 families living in the CDP. The population density was 2,787.8 inhabitants per square mile (1,076.4/km^{2}). There were 1,136 housing units at an average density of 710.4 per square mile (274.3/km^{2}). The racial makeup of the CDP was 66.20% White, 26.96% African American, 0.02% Native American, 3.30% Asian, 0.31% Pacific Islander, 2.58% from other races, and 0.63% from two or more races. Hispanic or Latino of any race were 4.13% of the population.

There were 1,091 households, out of which 34.5% had children under the age of 18 living with them, 52.2% were married couples living together, 11.3% had a female householder with no husband present, and 32.4% were non-families. 25.5% of all households were made up of individuals, and 6.0% had someone living alone who was 65 years of age or older. The average household size was 2.53 and the average family size was 3.08.

In the CDP, the population was spread out, with 16.2% under the age of 18, 12.4% from 18 to 24, 43.6% from 25 to 44, 21.2% from 45 to 64, and 6.5% who were 65 years of age or older. The median age was 35 years. For every 100 females, there were 172.8 males. For every 100 females age 18 and over, there were 192.6 males.

The median income for a household in the CDP was $56,500, and the median income for a family was $63,281. Males had a median income of $29,694 versus $32,841 for females. The per capita income for the CDP was $21,642. About 2.9% of families and 6.7% of the population were below the poverty line, including 7.1% of those under age 18 and none of those age 65 or over.

== Government and infrastructure ==
The Lower Providence Township administration building is in Eagleville.

The Montgomery County Correctional Facility is in Eagleville.

== Education ==
The Methacton School District serves Eagleville CDP.

Eagleville Elementary School is in the Eagleville CDP, and all areas of the Eagleville CDP are zoned to it.

Skyview Upper Elementary School, Arcola Intermediate School, and Methacton High School serve all parts of the district. Skyview Upper and Arcola Intermediate are in Trooper CDP, and Methacton High is near the Eagleville CDP but not in it.

Lower Providence Community Library is in Eagleville CDP.
