= Skippack Bridge =

- U.S. National Register of Historic Places
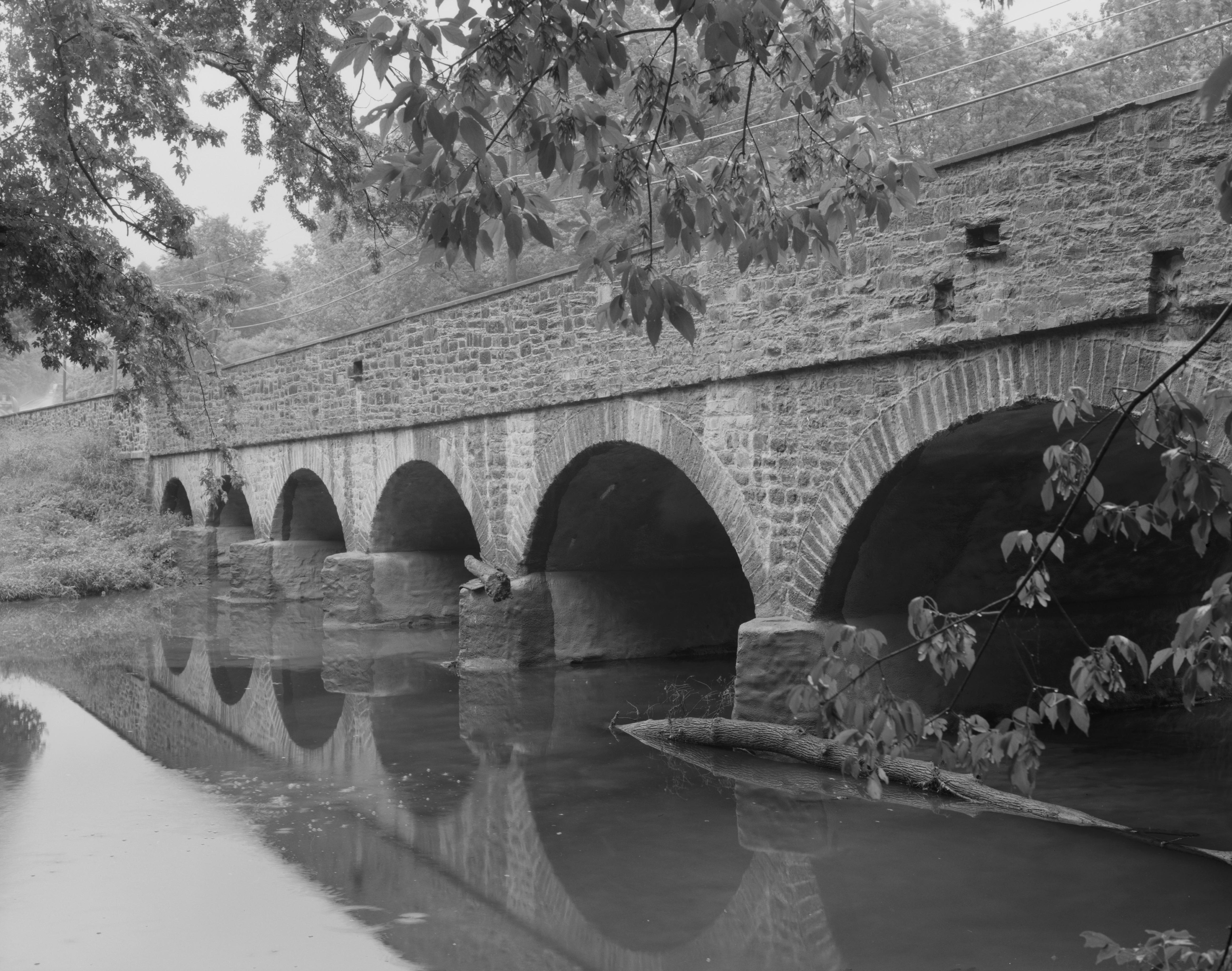
- Skippack Stone Arch Bridge, HABS photo, June 1994

- Location within Pennsylvania Location within the United States
- Location: East of Evansburg on Germantown Pike, Lower Providence Township, Pennsylvania
- Coordinates: 40°10′49″N 75°25′18″W
- Area: 2 acres (0.81 ha)
- Built: 1792, 1874
- Architectural style: Eight-arch masonry
- NRHP reference No.: 70000551
- Added to NRHP: December 2, 1970

Skippack Bridge, also known as Montgomery County Bridge No. 142, is a historic stone arch bridge located near Evansburg in Lower Providence Township, Montgomery County, Pennsylvania. The bridge was built in 1792 and repaired in 1874. It has eight spans, is 33-foot (10 m) wide, with an overall length of 202-foot (62 m). The bridge carries Germantown Pike across Skippack Creek.

It was listed on the National Register of Historic Places in 1970.

== See also ==
- List of bridges documented by the Historic American Engineering Record in Pennsylvania
