= Montgomery County, Pennsylvania =

County in Pennsylvania, United States

- County
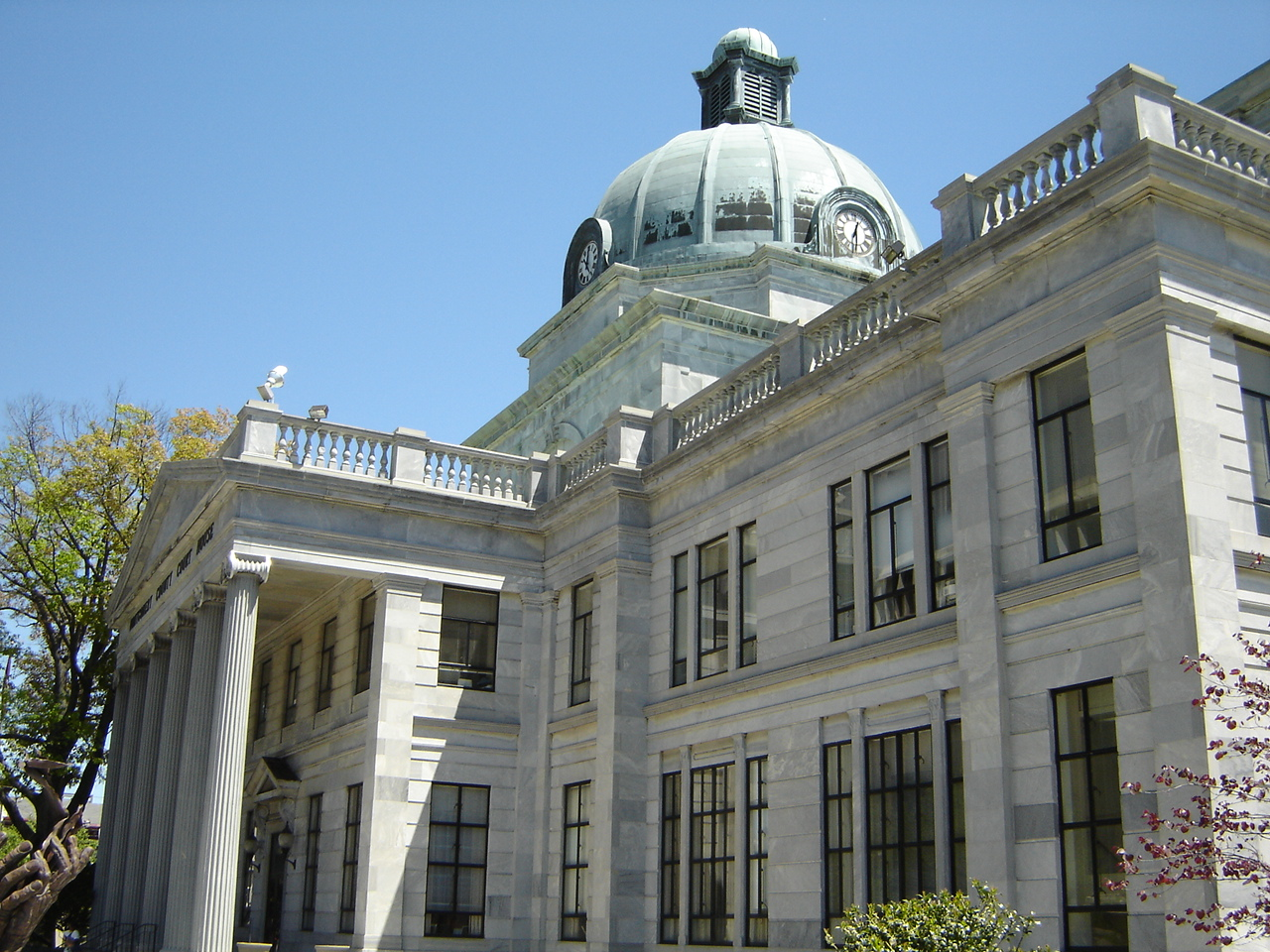
- Montgomery County Courthouse in Norristown, May 2007

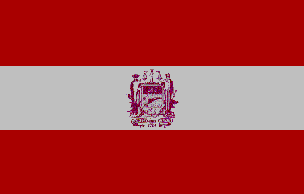
- Flag Seal
- Nickname: Montco
- Location within the U.S. state of Pennsylvania
- Coordinates: 40°13′N 75°22′W
- Country: United States
- State: Pennsylvania
- Founded: September 10, 1784
- Named for: Richard Montgomery or Montgomeryshire
- Seat: Norristown
- Largest municipality: Lower Merion Township

Government
  - County Commissioners: Jamila H. Winder, Chair; Neil K. Makhija, Vice Chair; Thomas DiBello, Commissioner

Area
  - Total: 487 sq mi (1,260 km^{2})
  - Land: 483 sq mi (1,250 km^{2})
  - Water: 4.2 sq mi (11 km^{2}) 0.9%

Population (2020)
  - Total: 856,553
  - Estimate (2025): 877,643 ▲
  - Density: 1,773/sq mi (685/km^{2})
- Time zone: UTC−5 (Eastern)
  - Summer (DST): UTC−4 (EDT)
- Congressional districts: 1st, 4th, 5th
- Website: montgomerycountypa.gov

Interactive map of Montgomery County, Pennsylvania

Montgomery County, colloquially referred to as Montco, is in the Commonwealth of Pennsylvania. As of the 2020 census, the population of the county was 856,553, making it the third-most populous county in Pennsylvania after Philadelphia and Allegheny counties and the most populous county in Pennsylvania without a major city.

The county seat and largest city is Norristown. The county is part of the Philadelphia metropolitan area, and marks the area's northern border with the Lehigh Valley region of eastern Pennsylvania.

The county borders Philadelphia, the nation's sixth-largest city, to its southeast, Bucks County to its east, Berks and Lehigh counties to its north, Delaware County to its south, and Chester County to its southwest.

The county was created on September 10, 1784, out of land originally part of Philadelphia County. The first courthouse was housed in Barley Sheaf Inn. The county is named after Richard Montgomery, an American Revolutionary War general killed on December 31, 1775 while attempting to capture Quebec City.

== Geography ==
According to the U.S. Census Bureau, the county has a total area of 487 square miles (1,260 km^{2}), 483 square miles (1,250 km^{2}) of which was land and 4.2 square miles (11 km^{2}) (0.9%) of which was water.

=== Adjacent counties ===
- Lehigh County (north)
- Bucks County (northeast)
- Philadelphia County (southeast)
- Delaware County (southwest)
- Chester County (west)
- Berks County (northwest)

=== National protected area ===
- Valley Forge National Historical Park (part)

=== County-owned parks ===
| Park | Acres | Trail Miles |
|---|---|---|
| Perkiomen Valley Park | 800 | 19 |
| Green Lane Park | 3,400 | 25 |
| Schuylkill Canal Park | – | 5 |
| Lorimer Park | 230 | 5.4 |
| Lower Perkiomen Valley Park | 107 | – |
| Norristown Farm Park | 690 | 8 |
| Upper Schuylkill Valley Park | 15 | – |

== Demographics ==
Historical population
| Census | Pop. | Note | %± |
|---|---|---|---|
| 1790 | 22,918 | | — |
| 1800 | 24,150 | | 5.4% |
| 1810 | 29,703 | | 23.0% |
| 1820 | 35,793 | | 20.5% |
| 1830 | 39,406 | | 10.1% |
| 1840 | 47,241 | | 19.9% |
| 1850 | 58,291 | | 23.4% |
| 1860 | 70,500 | | 20.9% |
| 1870 | 81,612 | | 15.8% |
| 1880 | 96,494 | | 18.2% |
| 1890 | 123,290 | | 27.8% |
| 1900 | 138,995 | | 12.7% |
| 1910 | 169,590 | | 22.0% |
| 1920 | 199,310 | | 17.5% |
| 1930 | 265,804 | | 33.4% |
| 1940 | 289,247 | | 8.8% |
| 1950 | 353,068 | | 22.1% |
| 1960 | 516,682 | | 46.3% |
| 1970 | 623,799 | | 20.7% |
| 1980 | 643,621 | | 3.2% |
| 1990 | 678,111 | | 5.4% |
| 2000 | 750,097 | | 10.6% |
| 2010 | 799,884 | | 6.6% |
| 2020 | 856,553 | | 7.1% |
| 2025 (est.) | 877,643 | ▲ | 2.5% |
U.S. Decennial Census; 1790–1960 1900–1990; 1990–2000 2010–2020

=== 2020 census ===
As of the 2020 census, the county had a population of 856,553 and a median age of 41.4 years. 21.3% of residents were under the age of 18 and 18.7% of residents were 65 years of age or older. For every 100 females there were 94.4 males, and for every 100 females age 18 and over there were 91.7 males age 18 and over.

The racial makeup of the county was 73.3% White (72.2% White, non-Hispanic), 9.5% Black or African American, 0.2% American Indian and Alaska Native, 7.9% Asian, <0.1% Native Hawaiian and Pacific Islander, 2.9% from some other race, and 6.1% from two or more races. Hispanic or Latino residents of any race comprised 6.4% of the population.

96.7% of residents lived in urban areas, while 3.3% lived in rural areas.

There were 328,958 households in the county, of which 30.2% had children under the age of 18 living in them. Of all households, 53.0% were married-couple households, 15.6% were households with a male householder and no spouse or partner present, and 25.6% were households with a female householder and no spouse or partner present. About 26.6% of all households were made up of individuals and 12.2% had someone living alone who was 65 years of age or older.

There were 346,877 housing units, of which 5.2% were vacant. Among occupied housing units, 70.8% were owner-occupied and 29.2% were renter-occupied. The homeowner vacancy rate was 1.1% and the rental vacancy rate was 7.4%.

=== Racial and ethnic composition as of 2025 ===
White alone 75.7%

Black alone 10.8%

American/Alaskan indigenous alone 0.5%

Asian alone 9.0%

Hawaiian & pacific islander alone 0.1%

2+ races 4.0%

Hispanic/Latino 7.4%

Montgomery County, Pennsylvania – Racial and ethnic composition Note: the US Census treats Hispanic/Latino as an ethnic category. This table excludes Latinos from the racial categories and assigns them to a separate category. Hispanics/Latinos may be of any race.
| Race / Ethnicity (NH = Non-Hispanic) | Pop 1980 | Pop 1990 | Pop 2000 | Pop 2010 | Pop 2020 | % 1980 | % 1990 | % 2000 | % 2010 | % 2020 |
|---|---|---|---|---|---|---|---|---|---|---|
| White alone (NH) | 598,528 | 614,659 | 640,019 | 631,784 | 618,244 | 92.99% | 90.64% | 85.32% | 78.99% | 72.18% |
| Black or African American alone (NH) | 30,517 | 38,303 | 55,303 | 67,582 | 79,510 | 4.74% | 5.65% | 7.37% | 8.45% | 9.28% |
| Native American or Alaska Native alone (NH) | 486 | 657 | 688 | 791 | 763 | 0.08% | 0.10% | 0.09% | 0.10% | 0.09% |
| Asian alone (NH) | 7,438 | 15,815 | 30,126 | 51,354 | 67,761 | 1.16% | 2.33% | 4.02% | 6.42% | 7.91% |
| Native Hawaiian or Pacific Islander alone (NH) | x | x | 236 | 221 | 168 | x | x | 0.03% | 0.03% | 0.02% |
| Other race alone (NH) | 1,261 | 320 | 875 | 1,206 | 3,863 | 0.20% | 0.05% | 0.12% | 0.15% | 0.45% |
| Mixed race or Multiracial (NH) | x | x | 7,550 | 12,703 | 31,732 | x | x | 1.01% | 1.59% | 3.70% |
| Hispanic or Latino (any race) | 5,391 | 8,357 | 15,300 | 34,233 | 54,512 | 0.84% | 1.23% | 2.04% | 4.28% | 6.36% |
| Total | 643,621 | 678,111 | 750,097 | 799,874 | 856,553 | 100.00% | 100.00% | 100.00% | 100.00% | 100.00% |

=== 2010 census ===
The largest townships/boroughs in Montgomery County include:

| Township/borough | Population (2010 US Census) | Density mi^{2} |
|---|---|---|
| Lower Merion Township | 57,825 | 2,526.1 |
| Abington Township | 55,310 | 3,630.3 |
| Cheltenham Township | 36,793 | 4,083.1 |
| Municipality of Norristown | 34,324 | 9,806.9 |
| Upper Merion Township | 28,395 | 1,593.3 |
| Horsham Township | 26,147 | 1,398.6 |
| Upper Dublin Township | 25,569 | 1,960.7 |
| Lower Providence Township | 25,436 | 1,458.8 |
| Montgomery Township | 24,790 | 2,067.1 |
| Upper Moreland Township | 24,015 | 3,202 |

== Economy ==
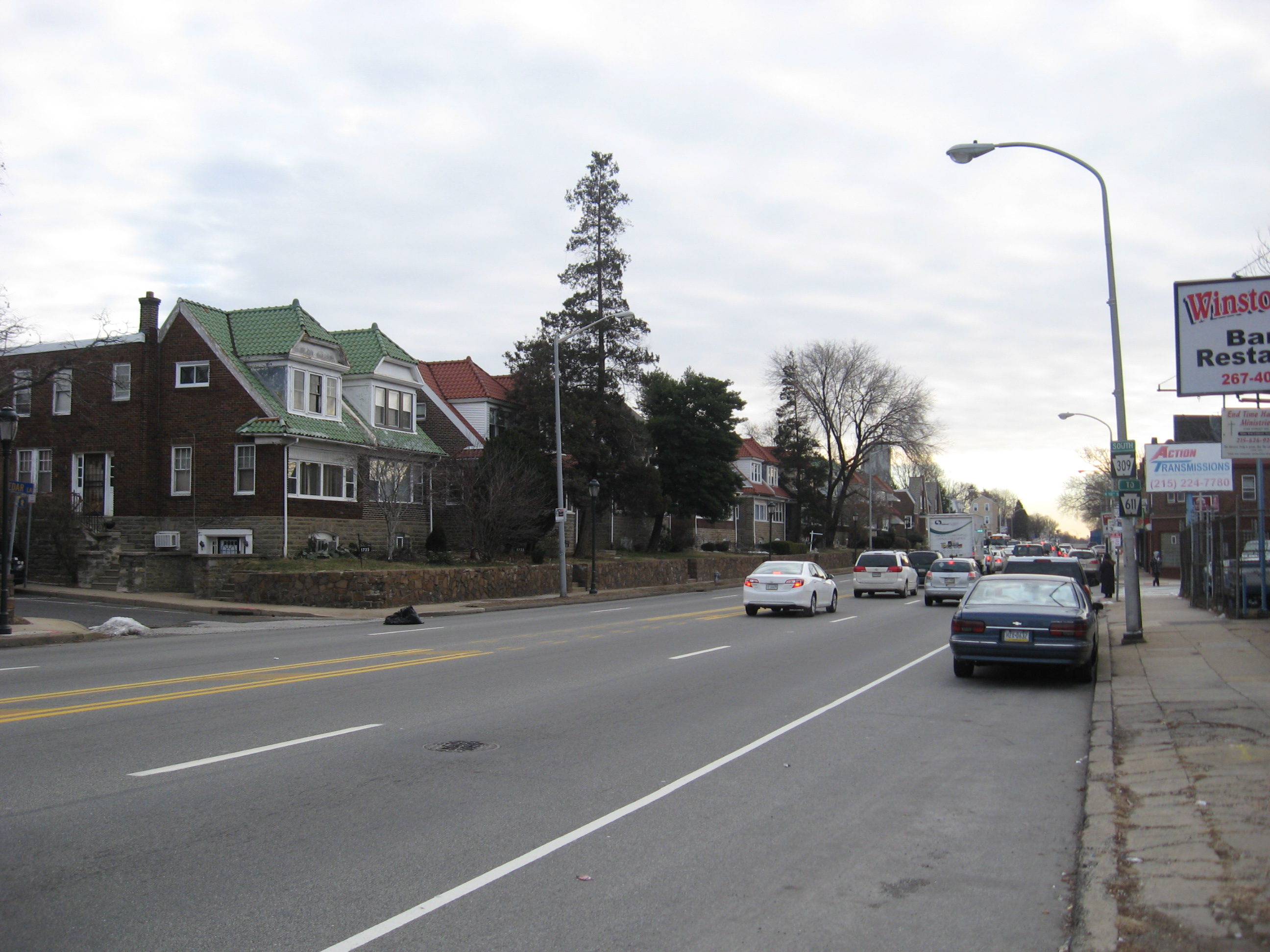
Montgomery County ranges from the densely populated rowhouse streets of Cheltenham Township (top) to the forests and open land around Perkiomen Creek in the northern part of the county (bottom).

Montgomery County is a suburb of Philadelphia, the nation's sixth most populous city. Many Montco residents work in the city, but the county is also a major employment center with large business parks in Blue Bell, Lansdale, Fort Washington, Horsham, and King of Prussia attracting thousands of workers from all over the region. The strong job base and taxes generated by those jobs have resulted in Montgomery County receiving the highest credit rating of 'AAA' from Standard & Poor's, one of fewer than 30 counties in the United States with such a rating. In 2012, Moody's downgraded the general obligation rating to Aa1, and in 2018 the rating was revised back to Aaa.

Major employers include:

- Abington School District
- ABM Industries
- ACTS Retirement-Life Communities
- Aetna
- Arcadia University
- Giant
- GlaxoSmithKline
- Hatfield Quality Meats
- Hatboro-Horsham School District
- Holy Redeemer Health System
- Janssen
- Jefferson Abington Hospital
- Lockheed Martin
- Lower Merion School District
- King of Prussia Mall
- Main Line Health
- McNeil Consumer Healthcare
- Merck
- Montgomery County Community College
- Motorola Mobility
- Norristown Area School District
- North Penn School District
- Pfizer
- Prudential
- Quaker Chemical Corporation
- Quest Diagnostics
- SEI Investments Company
- Souderton Area School District
- Spring-Ford Area School District

== Education ==
=== Colleges and universities ===
- Arcadia University
- Bryn Athyn College
- Bryn Mawr College
- Drexel University Elkins Park Campus
- Gwynedd Mercy University
- Harcum College
- Haverford College
- Manor College
- Montgomery County Community College
- Penn State Abington – a commonwealth campus of Pennsylvania State University
- Reconstructionist Rabbinical College
- Rosemont College
- St. Charles Borromeo Seminary
- Saint Joseph's University
- Temple University – Ambler
- Ursinus College
- Westminster Theological Seminary

=== Public school districts ===
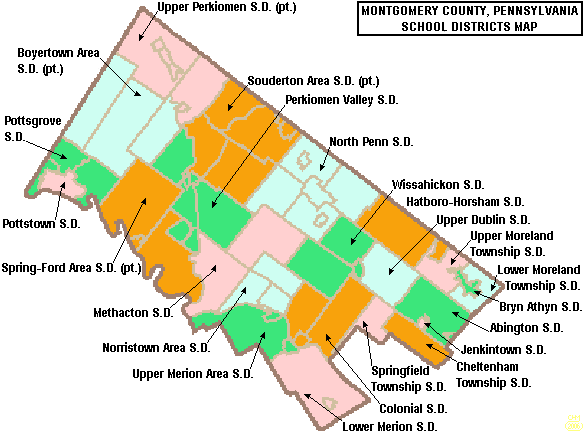
Map of Montgomery County public school districts

School districts:

- Abington School District
- Boyertown Area School District
- Cheltenham Township School District
- Colonial School District
- Hatboro-Horsham School District
- Jenkintown School District
- Lower Merion School District
- Lower Moreland Township School District
- Methacton School District
- Norristown Area School District
- North Penn School District
- Perkiomen Valley School District
- Pottsgrove School District
- Pottstown School District
- Souderton Area School District
- Springfield Township School District
- Spring-Ford Area School District
- Upper Dublin School District
- Upper Merion Area School District
- Upper Moreland School District
- Upper Perkiomen School District
- Wissahickon School District
- Bryn Athyn School District – exists as an entity, but does not operate any schools. Public school students attend class in neighboring districts.

=== Private secondary schools ===
- Academy Of The New Church Boys School
- Academy Of The New Church Girls School
- Abington Friends School
- The Baldwin School
- AIM Academy
- Jack M. Barrack Hebrew Academy, formerly known as the Akiba Hebrew Academy
- Bishop McDevitt High School (closed)
- Calvary Baptist School
- Coventry Christian Schools
- Dock Mennonite Academy
- Friends' Central School
- Germantown Academy
- Gwynedd Mercy Academy High School
- Haverford School
- The Hill School
- Huntingdon Valley Christian Academy
- Indian Creek Mennonite School
- Lakeside School
- Lansdale Catholic High School
- La Salle College High School
- Lincoln Academy
- Main Line Academy
- Martin Luther School
- Mary, Mother of the Redeemer Catholic School
- Meadowbrook School
- Merion Mercy Academy
- Mount Saint Joseph Academy
- New Life Youth and Family Services
- The Pathway School
- The Perkiomen School
- Phil-Mont Christian Academy
- Pope John Paul II Catholic High School, replaced Kennedy-Kenrick Catholic High School and Saint Pius X High School in 2010.
- Reformation Christian School
- Saint Aloysius School
- Saint Basil Academy (closed)
- Saint Katherine Day School
- Stowe Lighthouse Christ Academy
- The Shipley School
- Torah Academy of Greater Philadelphia
- Trinity Christian Academy
- Valley Christian School at Huntingdon Valley Presbyterian Church
- Valley Forge Baptist Academy
- Wordsworth Academy
- Wyncote Academy

=== Night schools/adult education ===
- Abington Township Adult School
- Cheltenham Township Adult School

== Communities ==
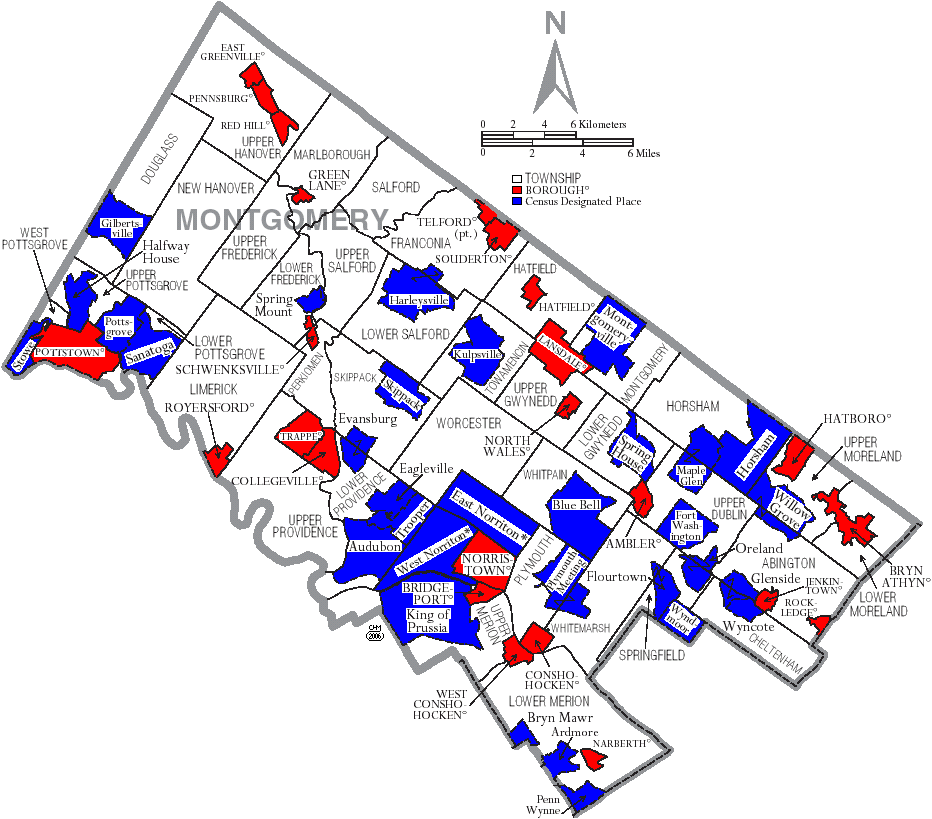
Map of Montgomery County with municipal labels showing boroughs (red), townships (white), and census-designated places (blue)

Under Pennsylvania law, five types of incorporated municipalities are listed: cities, boroughs, townships, home rule municipalities (which can include communities that bear the name "Borough" or "Township") and, in at most two cases, towns. These boroughs, townships, and home rule municipalities are located in Montgomery County:

=== Home rule municipalities ===
- Bryn Athyn
- Cheltenham Township
- Horsham Township
- Norristown (county seat)
- Plymouth Township
- Whitemarsh Township

=== Boroughs ===
- Ambler
- Bridgeport
- Bryn Athyn
- Collegeville
- Conshohocken
- East Greenville
- Green Lane
- Hatboro
- Hatfield
- Jenkintown
- Lansdale
- Narberth
- Norristown
- North Wales
- Pennsburg
- Pottstown
- Red Hill
- Rockledge
- Royersford
- Schwenksville
- Souderton
- Telford (lies partly in Bucks County)
- Trappe
- West Conshohocken

=== Townships ===
- Abington
- Cheltenham
- Douglass
- East Norriton
- Franconia
- Hatfield
- Horsham
- Limerick
- Lower Frederick
- Lower Gwynedd
- Lower Merion
- Lower Moreland
- Lower Pottsgrove
- Lower Providence
- Lower Salford
- Marlborough
- Montgomery
- New Hanover
- Perkiomen
- Plymouth
- Salford
- Skippack
- Springfield
- Towamencin
- Upper Dublin
- Upper Frederick
- Upper Gwynedd
- Upper Hanover
- Upper Merion
- Upper Moreland
- Upper Pottsgrove
- Upper Providence
- Upper Salford
- West Norriton
- West Pottsgrove
- Whitemarsh
- Whitpain
- Worcester

=== Unincorporated areas ===
==== Census-designated places ====
Census-designated places are geographical areas designated by the United States Census Bureau for the purposes of compiling demographic data. They are not actual jurisdictions under Pennsylvania law. Other unincorporated communities, such as villages, may be listed here, as well.

- Arcadia University
- Ardmore
- Audubon
- Bala Cynwyd
- Blue Bell
- Bryn Mawr
- Cheltenham (Cheltenham Village)
- Eagleville
- Elkins Park
- Evansburg
- Flourtown
- Fort Washington
- Gilbertsville
- Glenside
- Halfway House
- Harleysville
- Haverford College
- Horsham
- King of Prussia
- Kulpsville
- McKinley
- Maple Glen
- Merion Station
- Mont Clare
- Montgomeryville
- Oreland
- Penn Wynne
- Plymouth Meeting
- Pottsgrove
- Rosemont
- Roslyn
- Sanatoga
- Skippack
- Spring House
- Spring Mount
- Stowe
- Swedeland
- Trooper
- Villanova (partly in Delaware County)
- Willow Grove
- Woxall
- Wyncote
- Wyndmoor

Even though the historic village of Valley Forge, as well as the park, are partially located within Montgomery County, the modern village is in Chester County, PA

==== Other communities ====
- Ardsley
- Bethayres
- Dresher
- Frederick, a village in New Hanover Township.
- Graterford
- Gladwyne
- Gwynedd
- Gwynedd Valley
- Huntingdon Valley (small sections in Bucks County)
- Lafayette Hill
- Lederach
- Linfield
- Meadowbrook
- Melrose Park
- Oaks
- Port Providence
- Wynnewood (partly in Delaware County)

=== Population ranking ===
The population ranking of the following table is based on the 2020 census of Montgomery County.

† county seat

| Rank | City/Town/etc. | Municipal type | Population (2020 Census) |
|---|---|---|---|
| 1 | Lower Merion | Township | 63,633 |
| 2 | Abington | Township | 58,502 |
| 3 | Cheltenham | Township | 37,452 |
| 4 | † Norristown | Municipality | 35,748 |
| 5 | Upper Merion | Township | 33,613 |
| 6 | Upper Dublin | Township | 26,665 |
| 7 | Horsham | Township | 26,564 |
| 8 | Montgomery | Township | 25,862 |
| 9 | Lower Providence | Township | 25,625 |
| 10 | Upper Moreland | Township | 24,015 |
| 11 | Pottstown | Borough | 23,433 |
| 12 | King of Prussia | CDP | 22,028 |
| 13 | Upper Providence | Township | 21,219 |
| 14 | Springfield | Township | 20,814 |
| 15 | Limerick | Township | 20,458 |
| 16 | Whitpain | Township | 20,333 |
| 17 | Whitemarsh | Township | 19,707 |
| 18 | Lansdale | Borough | 18,773 |
| 19 | Plymouth | Township | 18,256 |
| 20 | Towamencin | Township | 18,009 |
| 21 | Hatfield | Township | 17,294 |
| 22 | Upper Gwynedd | Township | 17,072 |
| 23 | West Norriton | Township | 16,201 |
| 24 | Lower Salford | Township | 15,896 |
| 25 | Horsham | CDP | 15,193 |
| 26 | Skippack | Township | 14,386 |
| 27 | Lower Moreland | Township | 13,917 |
| 28 | Willow Grove | CDP | 13,730 |
| 29 | East Norriton | Township | 13,590 |
| 30 | Ardmore (partially in Delaware County) | CDP | 13,566 |
| 31 | Franconia | Township | 13,259 |
| 32 | Montgomeryville | CDP | 12,998 |
| 33 | New Hanover | Township | 12,973 |
| 34 | Lower Pottsgrove | Township | 12,217 |
| 35 | Lower Gwynedd | Township | 12,076 |
| 36 | Douglass | Township | 10,585 |
| 37 | Harleysville | CDP | 9,899 |
| 38 | Worcester | Township | 9,750 |
| 39 | Conshohocken | Borough | 9,261 |
| 40 | Perkiomen | Township | 8,959 |
| 41 | Audubon | CDP | 8,688 |
| 42 | Sanatoga | CDP | 8,496 |
| 43 | Upper Hanover | Township | 8,350 |
| 44 | Hatboro | Borough | 8,238 |
| 45 | Kulpsville | CDP | 8,159 |
| 46 | Glenside | CDP | 7,737 |
| 47 | Plymouth Meeting | CDP | 7,452 |
| 48 | Souderton | Borough | 7,191 |
| 49 | Ambler | Borough | 6,807 |
| 50 | Maple Glen | CDP | 6,647 |
| 51 | Blue Bell | CDP | 6,506 |
| 52 | Penn Wynne | CDP | 6,493 |
| 53 | Oreland | CDP | 6,210 |
| 54 | Fort Washington | CDP | 5,910 |
| 55 | Bryn Mawr | CDP | 5,879 |
| 56 | Upper Pottsgrove | Township | 5,870 |
| 57 | Wyndmoor | CDP | 5,853 |
| 58 | Gilbertsville | CDP | 5,508 |
| 59 | Trooper | CDP | 5,481 |
| 60 | Collegeville | Borough | 5,043 |
| 61 | Bridgeport | Borough | 5,015 |
| 62 | Royersford | Borough | 4,940 |
| 63 | Telford (partially in Bucks County) | Borough | 4,928 |
| 64 | Lower Frederick | Township | 4,830 |
| 65 | Eagleville | CDP | 4,800 |
| 66 | Flourtown | CDP | 4,786 |
| 67 | Jenkintown | Borough | 4,719 |
| 68 | Narberth | Borough | 4,492 |
| 69 | Gladwyne | CDP | 4,096 |
| 70 | Trappe | Borough | 4,002 |
| 71 | Pennsburg | Borough | 3,889 |
| 72 | Spring House | CDP | 3,978 |
| 73 | Skippack | CDP | 3,928 |
| 74 | West Pottsgrove | Township | 3,798 |
| 75 | Upper Frederick | Township | 3,703 |
| 76 | Stowe | CDP | 3,697 |
| 77 | Marlborough | Township | 3,520 |
| 78 | Hatfield | Borough | 3,496 |
| 79 | Pottsgrove | CDP | 3,471 |
| 80 | North Wales | Borough | 3,426 |
| 81 | Halfway House | CDP | 3,273 |
| 82 | Upper Salford | Township | 3,172 |
| 83 | East Greenville | Borough | 3,166 |
| 84 | Wyncote | CDP | 3,081 |
| 85 | Salford | Township | 3,035 |
| 86 | Rockledge | Borough | 2,638 |
| 87 | Spring Mount | CDP | 2,498 |
| 88 | Red Hill | Borough | 2,496 |
| 89 | Evansburg | CDP | 2,410 |
| 90 | Haverford College (mostly in Delaware County) | CDP | 1,497 |
| 91 | West Conshohocken | Borough | 1,493 |
| 92 | Woxhall | CDP | 1,297 |
| 93 | Schwenksville | Borough | 1,296 |
| 94 | Bryn Athyn | Municipality | 1,272 |
| 95 | Arcadia University | CDP | 758 |
| 96 | Green Lane | Borough | 490 |

== Transportation ==
=== Major roads and highways ===
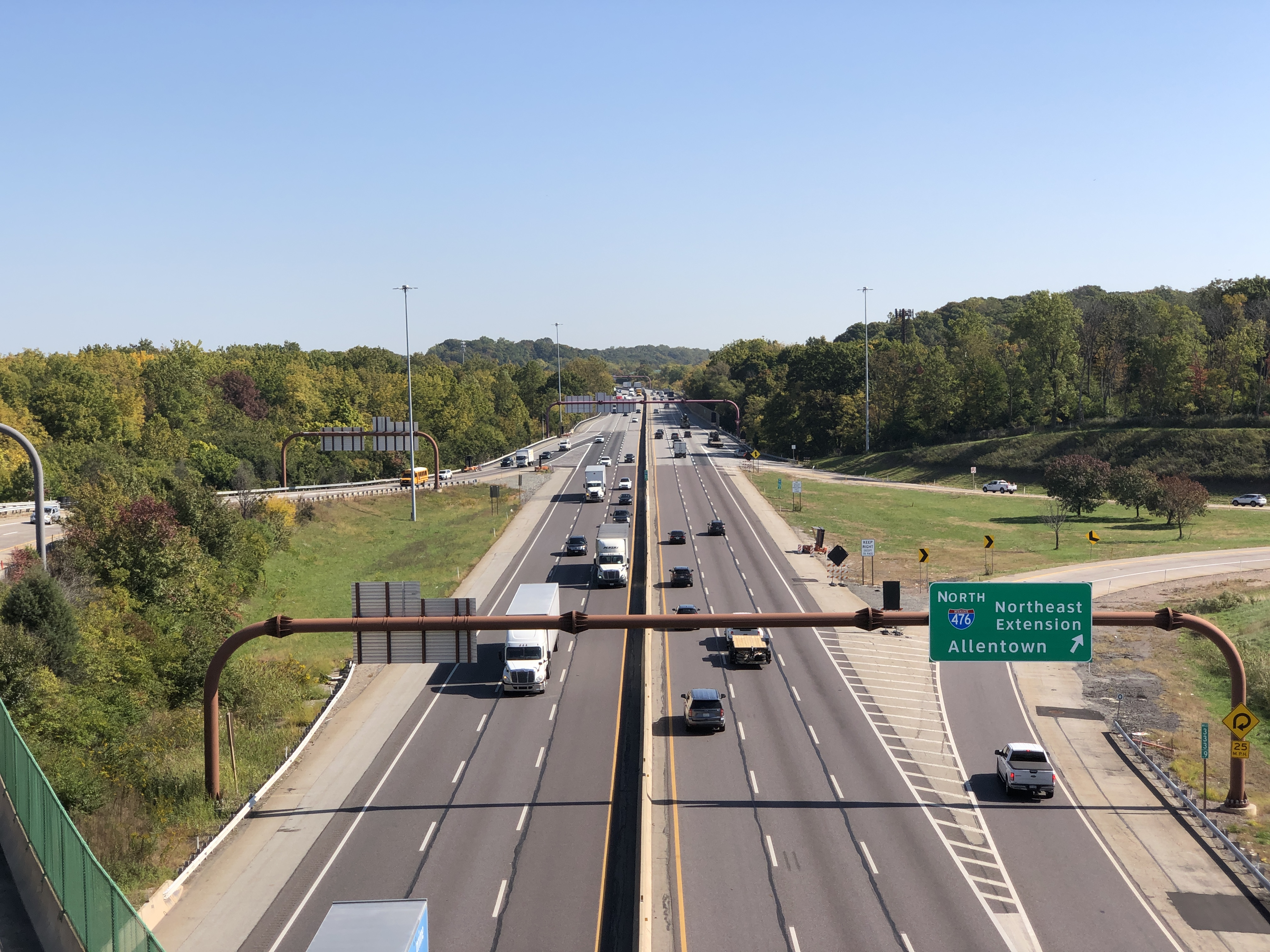
I-276/Pennsylvania Turnpike eastbound at the Interstate 476/Pennsylvania Turnpike Northeast Extension in Montgomery County

- I-76
- I-276 / Penna Turnpike
- I-476 / Penna Turnpike NE Extension
- US 1
- US 30
- US 202
- US 202 Bus.
- US 422
- PA 23
- PA 29
- PA 63
- PA 73
- PA 100
- PA 113
- PA 152
- PA 232
- PA 252
- PA 263
- PA 309
- PA 320
- PA 332
- PA 363
- PA 463
- PA 563
- PA 611
- PA 663

=== Public transportation ===
The county is served by the SEPTA, which include bus, commuter rail, and interurban rail services. Pottstown Area Rapid Transit (PART) also provides bus services around the Pottstown area in the western portion of the county.

- SEPTA
  - City Division and Suburban Division bus routes
  - Regional Rail's Cynwyd, Lansdale/Doylestown, Manayunk/Norristown, Paoli/Thorndale, Warminster, and West Trenton lines
  - Norristown High Speed Line (NHSL), an interurban light rapid transit line connecting the Norristown Transportation Center to 69th Street Transportation Center in Upper Darby, Delaware County

=== Airports ===
Commercial airline service is provided primarily by Philadelphia International Airport, one of the nation's largest commercial airports, located in Philadelphia and Delaware counties.

Other public use airports include Heritage Field in Limerick Township, Wings Field in Blue Bell, and Pottstown Municipal Airport in Pottstown.

== Culture ==
- The Institutes for the Achievement of Human Potential (IAHP), a nonprofit organization founded by Glenn Doman, was established in Wyndmoor in 1955. The IAHP is an educational organization that teaches parents about child brain development, and is a treatment center for brain-injured children.
- The Old York Road Symphony, based in Abington, is one of the oldest all-volunteer orchestras in the country, founded in 1932.

== Climate ==
The majority of the county has a hot-summer humid continental climate (Dfa). In most southern areas of the county and along the Schuylkill River including Pottstown a humid subtropical climate (Cfa) exists. The hardiness zone is 7a for the majority of the county and 7b in most areas south of Interstate 276. 6b only continues to exist in some very small higher areas in the north.

Climate data for Upper Hanover Twp (Elevation: 489 ft; 149 m) 1981 – 2010 Averages
| Month | Jan | Feb | Mar | Apr | May | Jun | Jul | Aug | Sep | Oct | Nov | Dec | Year |
|---|---|---|---|---|---|---|---|---|---|---|---|---|---|
| Mean daily maximum °F (°C) | 37.8 (3.2) | 41.1 (5.1) | 49.8 (9.9) | 61.7 (16.5) | 72.1 (22.3) | 80.8 (27.1) | 84.9 (29.4) | 83.2 (28.4) | 76.2 (24.6) | 64.5 (18.1) | 53.3 (11.8) | 41.8 (5.4) | 62.4 (16.9) |
| Daily mean °F (°C) | 29.3 (−1.5) | 31.9 (−0.1) | 39.7 (4.3) | 50.5 (10.3) | 60.4 (15.8) | 69.5 (20.8) | 74.0 (23.3) | 72.3 (22.4) | 64.8 (18.2) | 53.2 (11.8) | 43.5 (6.4) | 33.5 (0.8) | 52.0 (11.1) |
| Mean daily minimum °F (°C) | 20.8 (−6.2) | 22.7 (−5.2) | 29.6 (−1.3) | 39.2 (4.0) | 48.7 (9.3) | 58.3 (14.6) | 63.0 (17.2) | 61.4 (16.3) | 53.4 (11.9) | 41.9 (5.5) | 33.7 (0.9) | 25.2 (−3.8) | 41.6 (5.3) |
| Average precipitation inches (mm) | 3.27 (83) | 2.71 (69) | 3.55 (90) | 3.86 (98) | 4.27 (108) | 4.21 (107) | 4.83 (123) | 3.90 (99) | 4.63 (118) | 4.26 (108) | 3.65 (93) | 3.75 (95) | 46.89 (1,191) |
| Average relative humidity (%) | 68.4 | 65.1 | 60.6 | 59.5 | 63.6 | 69.0 | 69.0 | 71.8 | 72.9 | 71.4 | 70.4 | 70.7 | 67.7 |
| Average dew point °F (°C) | 20.2 (−6.6) | 21.5 (−5.8) | 27.2 (−2.7) | 36.9 (2.7) | 48.0 (8.9) | 58.9 (14.9) | 63.2 (17.3) | 62.7 (17.1) | 55.9 (13.3) | 44.2 (6.8) | 34.5 (1.4) | 25.0 (−3.9) | 41.6 (5.3) |
Source: PRISM

Climate data for Cheltenham (Elevation: 125 ft; 38 m) 1981 – 2010 Averages
| Month | Jan | Feb | Mar | Apr | May | Jun | Jul | Aug | Sep | Oct | Nov | Dec | Year |
|---|---|---|---|---|---|---|---|---|---|---|---|---|---|
| Mean daily maximum °F (°C) | 40.6 (4.8) | 43.9 (6.6) | 52.0 (11.1) | 63.3 (17.4) | 73.0 (22.8) | 82.3 (27.9) | 86.3 (30.2) | 84.9 (29.4) | 78.0 (25.6) | 66.7 (19.3) | 55.9 (13.3) | 44.9 (7.2) | 64.4 (18.0) |
| Daily mean °F (°C) | 33.2 (0.7) | 35.9 (2.2) | 43.2 (6.2) | 53.7 (12.1) | 63.2 (17.3) | 72.8 (22.7) | 77.3 (25.2) | 76.0 (24.4) | 68.8 (20.4) | 57.3 (14.1) | 47.5 (8.6) | 37.7 (3.2) | 55.6 (13.1) |
| Mean daily minimum °F (°C) | 25.8 (−3.4) | 27.8 (−2.3) | 34.3 (1.3) | 44.0 (6.7) | 53.4 (11.9) | 63.2 (17.3) | 68.4 (20.2) | 67.1 (19.5) | 59.6 (15.3) | 48.0 (8.9) | 39.2 (4.0) | 30.4 (−0.9) | 46.9 (8.3) |
| Average precipitation inches (mm) | 3.46 (88) | 2.77 (70) | 4.10 (104) | 3.92 (100) | 4.15 (105) | 4.12 (105) | 4.96 (126) | 4.24 (108) | 4.29 (109) | 3.71 (94) | 3.52 (89) | 3.92 (100) | 47.16 (1,198) |
| Average relative humidity (%) | 65.5 | 61.6 | 57.3 | 57.2 | 61.4 | 63.5 | 65.0 | 66.9 | 68.0 | 67.9 | 66.5 | 66.6 | 64.0 |
| Average dew point °F (°C) | 22.9 (−5.1) | 24.0 (−4.4) | 29.1 (−1.6) | 38.9 (3.8) | 49.7 (9.8) | 59.7 (15.4) | 64.6 (18.1) | 64.2 (17.9) | 57.8 (14.3) | 46.8 (8.2) | 36.9 (2.7) | 27.6 (−2.4) | 43.6 (6.4) |
Source: PRISM

== Politics ==
As of May 19, 2025, there are 614,908 registered voters in Montgomery County.

- Democratic: 301,143 (48.97%)
- Republican: 209,053 (34.00%)
- Independent: 77,115 (12.54%)
- Minor parties: 27,597 (4.49%)

Montgomery County historically was a stronghold for the Republican Party. The county was the only one carried by Barbara Hafer in the 1990 gubernatorial election over the incumbent governor, Bob Casey. However, the Democratic Party has made substantial gains in the county over the last quarter-century and gained the registration edge early in 2008.

Like neighboring Bucks County, the county voted Democratic during the Civil War era, voting Democratic between 1856 and 1876, except in 1860 and 1872. Like most of Philadelphia's suburbs, the brand of Republicanism practiced in Montgomery County for much of the 20th century was moderate. As the national parties have polarized, the county's voters have increasingly supported Democrats at the national level. The county voted for the Republican presidential nominee in all but three elections from 1880 to 1988, that being in 1892, 1912 and 1964. However, Montgomery County residents have voted for the Democratic presidential nominee since 1992, with the margins progressively increasing between every election, except in 2012. In the 2020 election, Joe Biden became the first Democrat to obtain over 60% of the county's vote.

Despite Donald Trump's victory in the state of Pennsylvania in the 2016 presidential election, Montgomery County was one of the few counties in Pennsylvania that swung in the Democratic presidential candidates' direction with Hillary Clinton winning Montgomery County with 58.87% of the vote, an improvement from Barack Obama's 56.6% vote share in 2012. In the 2016 U.S. Senate and Pennsylvania Attorney General elections, Montgomery County voted for Katie McGinty and Josh Shapiro, both Democrats.

Most county-level offices were held by Republicans until after the 2007 election, when Democrats picked up control of five row offices. Democrats have also won several elections in the Pennsylvania General Assembly in recent years, including two GOP-leaning State House districts in 2004, the 148th with Mike Gerber and the 153rd with current Governor Josh Shapiro. Today, although the county is very Democratic at the national level, at the state and local level, it is not specifically partisan.

In the 2004 United States Senate election, Republican Arlen Specter won the county over Montco resident Joe Hoeffel, but Democrat Bob Casey, Jr. out-polled Rick Santorum in the 2006 Senate election. In 2006, Democrat Rick Taylor unseated incumbent Republican Eugene McGill in the 151st, although Taylor lost in 2010 to Republican Todd Stephens and, in 2008, Democrat Matthew Bradford unseated incumbent Republican Jay Moyer in the 70th. Six of the county's 12 state house seats and four of the county's eight senate seats are now held by Democrats. All four statewide Democratic candidates carried Montgomery in 2008, with Barack Obama receiving 59% of the county's vote.

United States presidential election results for Montgomery County, Pennsylvania
| Year | Republican | | Democratic | | Third party(ies) | |
| Year | No. | % | No. | % | No. | % |
|---|---|---|---|---|---|---|
| 1880 | 11,026 | 49.75% | 11,025 | 49.75% | 112 | 0.51% |
| 1884 | 11,617 | 50.54% | 11,088 | 48.24% | 281 | 1.22% |
| 1888 | 13,445 | 50.90% | 12,582 | 47.63% | 390 | 1.48% |
| 1892 | 13,591 | 49.10% | 13,611 | 49.17% | 480 | 1.73% |
| 1896 | 17,329 | 61.25% | 9,985 | 35.29% | 980 | 3.46% |
| 1900 | 17,051 | 59.10% | 11,208 | 38.85% | 590 | 2.05% |
| 1904 | 18,833 | 62.58% | 10,420 | 34.62% | 843 | 2.80% |
| 1908 | 19,088 | 59.82% | 11,899 | 37.29% | 922 | 2.89% |
| 1912 | 8,978 | 26.69% | 11,894 | 35.37% | 12,760 | 37.94% |
| 1916 | 20,431 | 58.25% | 13,658 | 38.94% | 983 | 2.80% |
| 1920 | 31,963 | 69.70% | 12,239 | 26.69% | 1,653 | 3.60% |
| 1924 | 45,407 | 75.48% | 11,094 | 18.44% | 3,653 | 6.07% |
| 1928 | 76,680 | 76.37% | 23,026 | 22.93% | 702 | 0.70% |
| 1932 | 64,619 | 64.00% | 32,971 | 32.66% | 3,371 | 3.34% |
| 1936 | 66,442 | 52.52% | 57,870 | 45.74% | 2,194 | 1.73% |
| 1940 | 73,250 | 59.51% | 49,409 | 40.14% | 432 | 0.35% |
| 1944 | 78,260 | 61.71% | 47,815 | 37.70% | 752 | 0.59% |
| 1948 | 85,576 | 66.53% | 41,112 | 31.96% | 1,938 | 1.51% |
| 1952 | 115,899 | 66.62% | 57,701 | 33.17% | 373 | 0.21% |
| 1956 | 133,270 | 69.20% | 59,095 | 30.69% | 218 | 0.11% |
| 1960 | 142,796 | 60.68% | 92,212 | 39.18% | 318 | 0.14% |
| 1964 | 102,714 | 42.96% | 135,657 | 56.74% | 704 | 0.29% |
| 1968 | 141,621 | 54.32% | 102,464 | 39.30% | 16,647 | 6.38% |
| 1972 | 173,662 | 64.31% | 91,959 | 34.06% | 4,397 | 1.63% |
| 1976 | 155,480 | 56.92% | 112,644 | 41.24% | 5,045 | 1.85% |
| 1980 | 156,996 | 57.81% | 84,289 | 31.04% | 30,268 | 11.15% |
| 1984 | 181,426 | 64.18% | 99,741 | 35.29% | 1,499 | 0.53% |
| 1988 | 170,294 | 60.20% | 109,834 | 38.83% | 2,742 | 0.97% |
| 1992 | 125,704 | 39.46% | 136,572 | 42.87% | 56,300 | 17.67% |
| 1996 | 121,047 | 41.18% | 143,664 | 48.87% | 29,250 | 9.95% |
| 2000 | 145,623 | 43.81% | 177,990 | 53.54% | 8,809 | 2.65% |
| 2004 | 175,741 | 43.98% | 222,048 | 55.57% | 1,802 | 0.45% |
| 2008 | 165,552 | 39.16% | 253,393 | 59.94% | 3,796 | 0.90% |
| 2012 | 174,381 | 42.24% | 233,356 | 56.52% | 5,132 | 1.24% |
| 2016 | 162,731 | 37.10% | 256,082 | 58.38% | 19,839 | 4.52% |
| 2020 | 185,460 | 36.23% | 319,511 | 62.41% | 6,949 | 1.36% |
| 2024 | 198,311 | 37.91% | 317,103 | 60.62% | 7,724 | 1.48% |

United States Senate election results for Montgomery County, Pennsylvania1
| Year | Republican | | Democratic | | Third party(ies) | |
| Year | No. | % | No. | % | No. | % |
|---|---|---|---|---|---|---|
| 1994 | 113,099 | 50.49% | 101,505 | 45.32% | 9,384 | 4.19% |
| 2000 | 174,512 | 54.43% | 140,507 | 43.82% | 5,609 | 1.75% |
| 2006 | 111,507 | 38.09% | 181,274 | 61.91% | 0 | 0.00% |
| 2012 | 163,883 | 40.69% | 235,197 | 58.39% | 3,712 | 0.92% |
| 2018 | 126,666 | 33.26% | 248,454 | 65.23% | 5,745 | 1.51% |
| 2024 | 196,422 | 37.78% | 311,859 | 59.98% | 11,687 | 2.25% |

United States Senate election results for Montgomery County, Pennsylvania3
| Year | Republican | | Democratic | | Third party(ies) | |
| Year | No. | % | No. | % | No. | % |
|---|---|---|---|---|---|---|
| 1992 | 168,323 | 54.40% | 128,961 | 41.68% | 12,139 | 3.92% |
| 1998 | 139,956 | 67.04% | 60,315 | 28.89% | 8,495 | 4.07% |
| 2004 | 200,622 | 52.33% | 172,305 | 44.95% | 10,418 | 2.72% |
| 2010 | 131,955 | 45.92% | 155,413 | 54.08% | 0 | 0.00% |
| 2016 | 189,574 | 43.85% | 237,353 | 54.90% | 5,431 | 1.26% |
| 2022 | 143,077 | 34.65% | 260,207 | 63.01% | 9,670 | 2.34% |

Pennsylvania Gubernatorial election results for Montgomery County
| Year | Republican | | Democratic | | Third party(ies) | |
| Year | No. | % | No. | % | No. | % |
|---|---|---|---|---|---|---|
| 1970 | 95,399 | 46.89% | 100,940 | 49.62% | 7,107 | 3.49% |
| 1974 | 103,625 | 50.02% | 101,433 | 48.96% | 2,100 | 1.01% |
| 1978 | 135,304 | 65.27% | 70,272 | 33.90% | 1,719 | 0.83% |
| 1982 | 134,685 | 67.38% | 63,644 | 31.84% | 1,557 | 0.78% |
| 1986 | 129,771 | 65.42% | 66,823 | 33.69% | 1,777 | 0.90% |
| 1990 | 90,051 | 50.16% | 89,465 | 49.84% | 0 | 0.00% |
| 1994 | 110,319 | 48.14% | 85,077 | 37.13% | 33,754 | 14.73% |
| 1998 | 129,376 | 61.42% | 62,734 | 29.78% | 18,526 | 8.80% |
| 2002 | 81,835 | 31.38% | 175,157 | 67.16% | 3,811 | 1.46% |
| 2006 | 83,718 | 28.34% | 211,651 | 71.66% | 0 | 0.00% |
| 2010 | 139,244 | 48.29% | 149,080 | 51.71% | 0 | 0.00% |
| 2014 | 104,726 | 40.14% | 156,200 | 59.86% | 0 | 0.00% |
| 2018 | 120,206 | 31.51% | 256,252 | 67.18% | 4,988 | 1.31% |
| 2022 | 121,289 | 29.37% | 285,712 | 69.18% | 6,015 | 1.46% |

== Government ==
Montgomery County is governed by a three-person county commission. The current composition is two Democrats Neil Makhija, and Jamila Winder and one Republican, Thomas DiBello. With each commissioner serving four-year terms. According to Pennsylvania Law, the county commission must have one member of a minority party represented. One member of the minority party is represented because it ensures there is not a single party in control making all the decisions and providing partisan oversight. The board of commissioners is responsible for planning and managing more than $1 Billion dollar budget that funds different welfare programs including health, public safety, human services, and infrastructure. The board oversees different county departments, employing 2,800 county employees who work to distribute resources to 900,000 people in Montgomery County. The Board is also responsible for hiring county employees, naming department heads, and appointing most board and commission members.

Neil Makhija serves as Montgomery County Commissioner and Chair of the Board of Elections. Commissioner Neil oversees the $1.3 Billion budget and 2,800 county employees.

As chair of the Board of Elections, Neil oversees voting rights and ensures we have a safe, free, and fair election. In his first two years in office, him and the other commissioners increased affordability and expanded resources for residents. One of his biggest accomplishments was raising the county minimum wage for county workers to $20.52 an hour, benefitting the 2,800 county employees.

Jamila Winder has served as a commissioner since 2023, holding the role of chair. Jamila goal is to empower vulnerable residents. One of her biggest accomplishments is investing $18 million towards innovating behavior health emergency centers and making free period products available in all county's own buildings, and creating the first ever commission for LGBTQIA+ affairs among other things.

Thomas DiBello has served as a commissioner since 2024. DiBello has experience in designing and implementing large global technical software solutions in both tax and defense industries. He has served on different political positions in Montgomery in the past, focusing primarily on economic development. DeBillo is an avid supporter of youth sports and coaches' baseball and basketball in his community and is a board member of spring city American Legion Baseball.

=== County commissioners ===
| Holder | Party | Position |
|---|---|---|
| Neil K. Makhija | Democratic | Chair |
| Jamila H. Winder | Democratic | Vice Chair |
| Thomas DiBello | Republican | |

=== County row offices ===
As of the November 2019 election:

| Office | Holder | Party |
|---|---|---|
| Clerk of Courts | Lori Schreiber | Democratic |
| Controller | Karen Geld Sanchez | Democratic |
| Coroner | Janine Darby | Democratic |
| District Attorney | Kevin R. Steele | Democratic |
| Prothonotary | Noah Marlier | Democratic |
| Recorder of Deeds | Jeanne Sorg | Democratic |
| Register of Wills | Tina Lawson | Democratic |
| Sheriff | Sean Kilkenny | Democratic |
| Treasurer | Jason Salus | Democratic |
| Jury Commissioner | Joanne Cisco Olszewski | Democratic |
| Jury Commissioner | Merry Woods | Republican |

==== Same-sex marriage ====
On July 24, 2013, Montgomery County Register of Wills D. Bruce Hanes, a Democrat, announced he would begin issuing marriage licenses to same-sex couples, flouting Pennsylvania law banning such unions. Hanes called the commonwealth's ban "arbitrary and suspect", saying he believes it violates the Pennsylvania Constitution and the United States Constitution. The Republican administration of Governor Tom Corbett filed suit in the Commonwealth Court of Pennsylvania in an attempt to block Hanes from licensing same-sex marriage. Commonwealth Court Judge Dan Pellegrini ordered Hanes in September 2013 to stop issuing same-sex marriage licenses. After Federal Judge John Jones threw out Pennsylvania's ban on same-sex marriage in May 2014, calling it unconstitutional, offices in other counties were able to issue these licenses, while Hanes had to wait for the ruling against him to be removed.

=== United States Senate ===
| Senator | Party |
|---|---|
| Dave McCormick | Republican |
| John Fetterman | Democrat |

=== United States House of Representatives ===
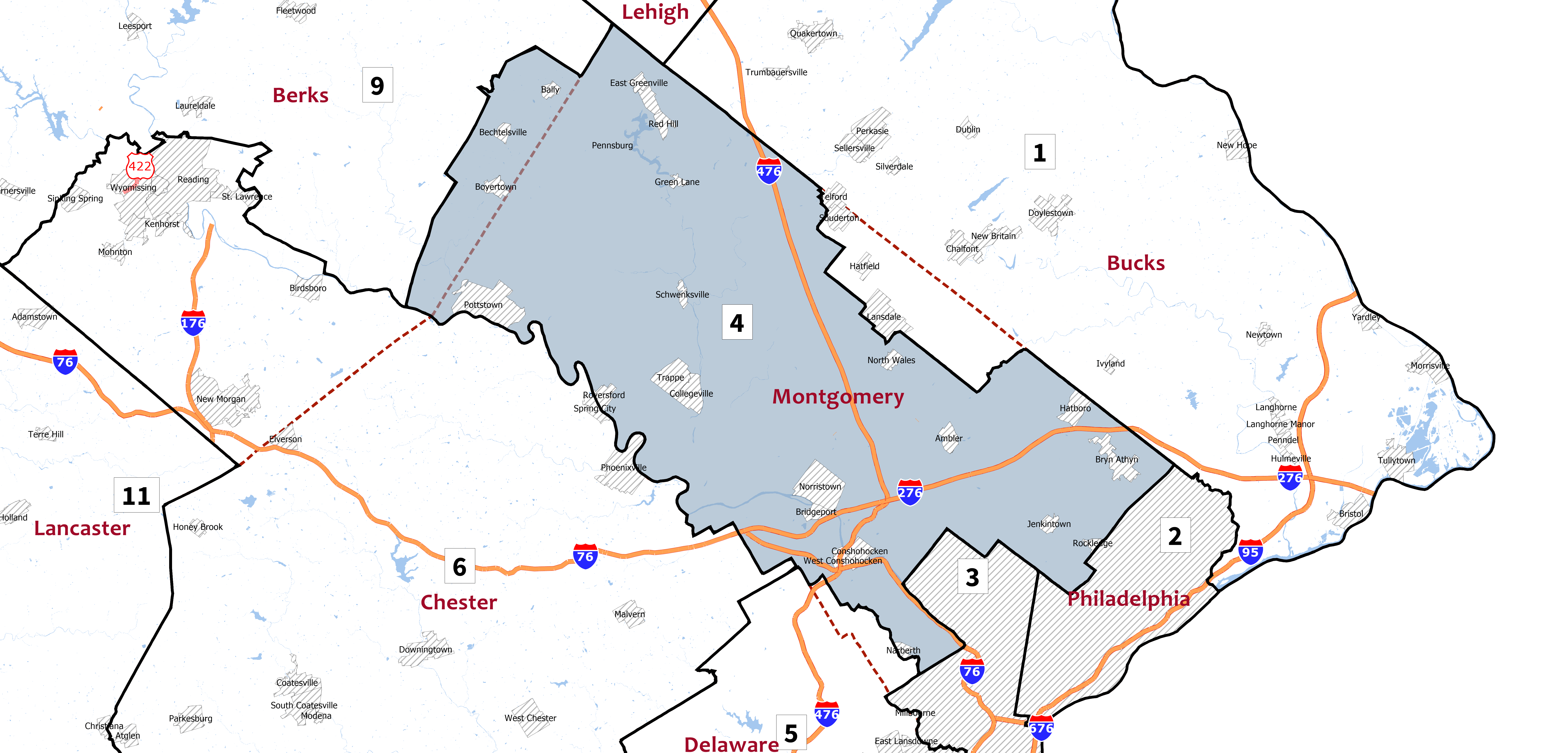
This 2018 Congressional map ordered by the Supreme Court of Pennsylvania places the majority of Montgomery County in the newly created 4th congressional district.

| District | Representative | Party |
|---|---|---|
| 1 | Brian Fitzpatrick | Republican |
| 4 | Madeleine Dean | Democratic |
| 5 | Mary Gay Scanlon | Democratic |

=== State senate ===
| District | Representative | Party |
|---|---|---|
| 4 | Art Haywood | Democratic |
| 7 | Vincent Hughes | Democratic |
| 12 | Maria Collett | Democratic |
| 17 | Amanda Cappelletti | Democratic |
| 24 | Tracy Pennycuick | Republican |
| 44 | Katie Muth | Democratic |

=== State House of Representatives ===
| District | Representative | Party |
|---|---|---|
| 26 | Paul Friel | Democratic |
| 53 | Steve Malagari | Democratic |
| 54 | Greg Scott | Democratic |
| 61 | Liz Hanbidge | Democratic |
| 70 | Matthew Bradford | Democratic |
| 131 | Milou Mackenzie | Republican |
| 146 | Joe Ciresi | Democratic |
| 147 | Donna Scheuren | Republican |
| 148 | Mary Jo Daley | Democratic |
| 149 | Tim Briggs | Democratic |
| 150 | Joseph Webster | Democratic |
| 151 | Melissa Cerrato | Democratic |
| 152 | Nancy Guenst | Democratic |
| 153 | Ben Sanchez | Democratic |
| 154 | Napoleon Nelson | Democratic |
| 157 | Melissa Shusterman | Democratic |
| 166 | Greg Vitali | Democratic |
| 172 | Kevin J. Boyle | Democratic |

== See also ==
- National Register of Historic Places listings in Montgomery County, Pennsylvania
