= Pennsylvania House of Representatives, District 147 =

American legislative district

Pennsylvania's 147th State House of Representatives district
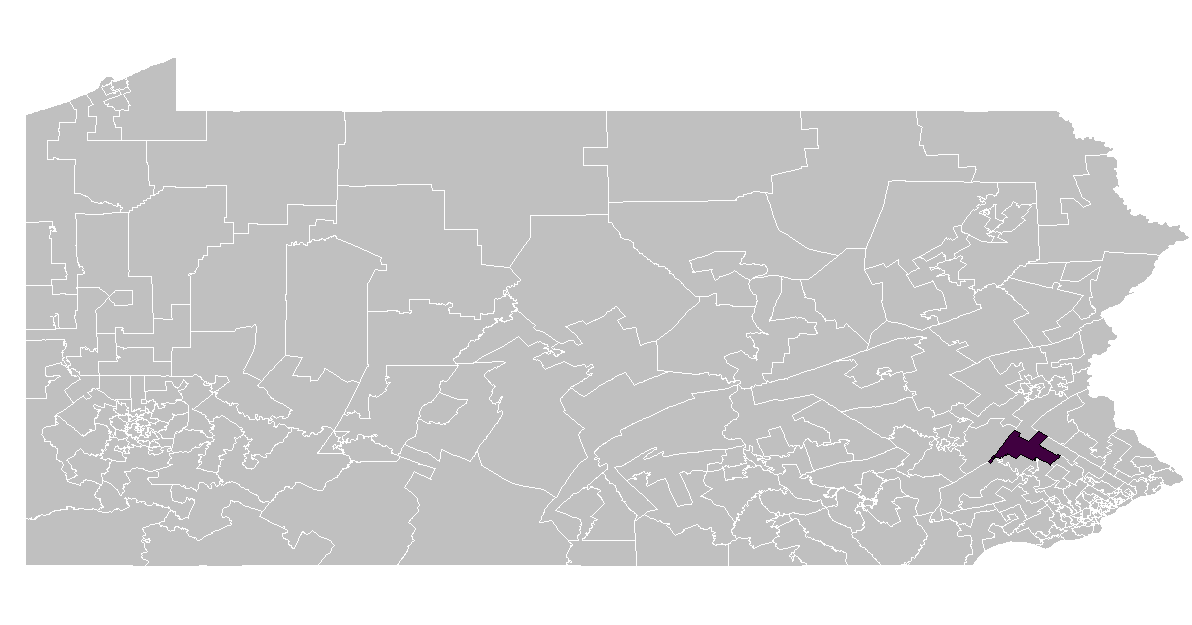
Representative
Donna Scheuren; R–Lower Salford Township, Montgomery County
- Demographics: 93.3% White; 2.6% Black; 2.2% Hispanic
- Population (2011) • Citizens of voting age: 62,015; 45,991

The 147th Pennsylvania House of Representatives District is located in Southeastern Pennsylvania and has been represented since 2023 by Donna Scheuren.

== District profile ==
The 147th District of the Pennsylvania House of Representatives is located in Montgomery County. It is made up of the following areas:

- Douglass Township
- Lower Frederick Township
- Lower Salford Township
- Franconia Township (Precincts 01,03,04,06,07)
- New Hanover Township
- Upper Frederick Township
- Upper Pottsgrove Township
- Upper Salford Township

== Representatives ==
Representative	Party	Years	District home	Notes
Before 1969, seats were apportioned by county.
G. Sieber Pancoast	Republican	1969 – 1978		
Marilyn Lewis	Republican	1979 – 1982		
Raymond Bunt	Republican	1983 – 2006		
Bob Mensch	Republican	2007 – 2009	Marlborough Township	Resigned after being elected to the Pennsylvania State Senate
Marcy Toepel	Republican	2010 – 2020	Douglass Township	Elected in a special election on May 18
Tracy Pennycuick	Republican	2020 – 2023	Lower Salford Township	Elected to Pennsylvania Senate, District 24 in 2022
Donna Scheuren	Republican	2023 – present	Lower Salford Township	Incumbent

== Recent election results ==
PA House election, 2010: Pennsylvania House, District 147
Party	Candidate	Votes	%	±%
Republican	Marcy Toepel	14,275	66.68	
Democratic	Robert Dodge	7,133	33.32	
Margin of victory		7,142	33.36	
Turnout		21,408	100	

PA House election, 2012: Pennsylvania House, District 147
Party	Candidate	Votes	%	±%
Republican	Marcy Toepel	18,812	61.36	▼5.32
Democratic	Betty White	11,846	38.64	▲5.32
Margin of victory		6,966	22.72	▼10.64
Turnout		30,658	100	

PA House election, 2014: Pennsylvania House, District 147
Party	Candidate	Votes	%	±%
Republican	Marcy Toepel	13,064	100	▲38.64
Margin of victory		13,064	100	
Turnout		13,064	100	

PA House election, 2016: Pennsylvania House, District 147
Party	Candidate	Votes	%	±%
Republican	Marcy Toepel	20,045	63.35	▼36.65
Democratic	Rachel Hendricks	11,597	36.65	▲36.65
Margin of victory		8,448	26.70	▼73.30
Turnout		31,642	100	

PA House election, 2018: Pennsylvania House, District 147
Party	Candidate	Votes	%	±%
Republican	Marcy Toepel	15,766	56.67	▼6.68
Democratic	Joshua Camson	12,056	43.33	▲6.68
Margin of victory		3,710	13.34	▼13.36
Turnout		27,822	100	

PA House election, 2020: Pennsylvania House, District 147
Party	Candidate	Votes	%	±%
Republican	Tracy Pennycuick	21,125	54.73	▼1.94
Democratic	Jill Dennin	16,283	42.19	▼1.14
Libertarian	Jared Martin	1,187	3.08	▲3.08
Margin of victory		4,842	12.54	▼0.80
Turnout		38,595	100	

PA House election, 2022: Pennsylvania House, District 147
Party	Candidate	Votes	%	±%
Republican	Donna Scheuren	17,667	54.2	▼0.52
Democratic	Alexandra Wisser	14,626	44.8	▲2.61
Margin of victory		3,041	9.4	▼3.12
Turnout		32,293	100	

PA House election, 2024: Pennsylvania House, District 147
Party	Candidate	Votes	%	±%
Republican	Donna Scheuren	23,792	58.6	▲4.4
Democratic	Albert Leach	16,835	41.4	▼3.4
Margin of victory		3,041	17.2	▲7.8
Turnout		40,627	100	

PA House election, 2026: Pennsylvania House, District 147
Party	Candidate	Votes	%	±%
Democratic	Margaret Burke	16,017	50.42	▲9.02
Republican	Donna Scheuren	15,751	49.58	▼9.02
Margin of victory		266	0.8	▼16.4
Turnout		31,768	100	
