= Marcy Toepel =

American politician (born 1958)

Marcy L. Toepel

Member of the Pennsylvania House of Representatives from the 147th district
- In office June 9, 2010 – November 30, 2020
- Preceded by: Bob Mensch
- Succeeded by: Tracy Pennycuick

Personal details
- Born: August 17, 1958 (age 67) Pottstown, Pennsylvania
- Party: Republican
- Spouse: Mark
- Children: 5

Marcy L. Toepel is an American politician and member of the Republican Party. She represented the 147th District in the Pennsylvania House of Representatives from 2010 until 2020.

== Formative years ==
Born in Pottstown, Pennsylvania, on August 17, 1958, Toepel graduated from Boyertown Area High School in 1976.

== Public service career ==
Prior to her election to the Pennsylvania House of Representatives, Toepel served as a member of the executive committee of the Montgomery County Republican Committee, and was elected to the Boyertown Area School Board; she served on that board from 1993 to 1997.

During the early 2000s, Toepel was employed as the first deputy, clerk of courts in Montgomery County, Pennsylvania. She was then employed as Montgomery County's first deputy recorder of deeds, beginning in 2008. In 2007, she ran unsuccessfully for the position of clerk of courts, losing in a closely contested race to Democratic candidate Ann Thornburg Weiss.

On June 9, 2010, Toepel took her seat in the Pennsylvania House after winning a special election on May 10 that was triggered by the resignation of Republican Bob Mensch. Mensch had won another special election held for the State Senate seat vacated by Republican Rob Wonderling, who had resigned to take-over as President and CEO of Greater Philadelphia Chamber of Commerce.

After serving out the remainder of that 2009 term, she was re-elected to the Pennsylvania House for five additional, consecutive terms. In July 2012, she co-sponsored a proposed amendment to the commonwealth's state gaming law to redirect the two percent of annual revenues received by Montgomery County from the Valley Forge Resort & Casino from its then-model of funding local, tax-supported, public infrastructure projects to, instead, provide funding for county non-profits that were providing services to women and children who were victims of domestic violence, as well as to the county's historic sites, parks and hiking trails. Earlier that same year, she was a co-sponsor of the "Woman's Right to Know Act," a proposed bill that would have required any pregnant woman seeking an abortion to undergo an ultrasound procedure "at least 24 hours before" the abortion could be performed, and would also have required "that a photo of the ultrasound be placed within the patient's line of sight, and that she be given the opportunity to listen to the fetal heartbeat." As word of the bill spread statewide, "Sponsors of the bill later clarified that a woman would not have to look at the printout." Initially placed on the legislative calendar, it was tabled as legislators received increasingly negative feedback from constituents.

Appointed to the Select Committee on School Safety in 2013, she was also appointed as deputy whip, serving in that role from 2013 to 2016. She was then elected as majority caucus chair and appointed to the Joint State Government Commission, and held both of those posts from 2017 to 2020, while also serving on the SEPTA board of directors from January 2017 to December 2020.

In December 2019, Toepel announced that she would not seek re-election. She was replaced by Tracy Pennycuick.
