= Geltz =

Geltz is a surname. Notable people with the surname include:

- James A. Geltz (1900–1963), American attorney and politician
- Steve Geltz (born 1987), American baseball player
- Tim Geltz, 20th century American soccer player

== See also ==
- Goelz
