= Zern =

Zern is a surname. Notable people with the surname include:

- Ed Zern (1910–1994), American writer, humorist, fisherman, environmentalist and conservationist
- Jacob Zern (1845–1926), American physician, judge, and politician

== See also ==
- Zern Joseph (1903–1977), American football player and automobile executive
- Zern's Farmer's Market, in Gilbertsville, Pennsylvania
