= Martin Murray =

Martin Murray is the name of:

- Martin Murray (boxer) (born 1982), British professional boxer
- Martin Glyn Murray (born 1966), Welsh actor
- Martin L. Murray (1909–1990), Democratic member of the Pennsylvania State Senate
- Martin Murray (footballer) (born 1958), Irish footballer and manager
