= Marilyn Lewis =

American politician (1931–2020)

Member of the Pennsylvania House of Representatives from the 147th district
- In office January 2, 1979 – November 30, 1982
- Preceded by: G. Sieber Pancoast
- Succeeded by: Raymond Bunt

Personal details
- Born: July 19, 1931 Philadelphia, Pennsylvania, U.S.
- Died: December 7, 2020 (aged 89) Lansdale, Pennsylvania
- Party: Republican
- Spouse: Andrew L. Lewis Jr.
- Children: Karen, Andrew, and Russell Lewis

Marilyn Stoughton Lewis (July 19, 1931 – December 7, 2020) was an American politician who served as a Republican member of the Pennsylvania House of Representatives from 1979 to 1982.

== Formative years ==
Born in Philadelphia, Pennsylvania on July 19, 1931, Lewis was a daughter of Russell S. and Bernice Bernard Stoughton. After graduating from Norristown High School in Norristown, Pennsylvania, she pursued higher education studies at Harcum College and the University of Miami.

She met her future husband, Andrew L. Lewis Jr., while they were still in high school. Both eighteen when they eloped, they were married in 1950. Her husband later became a businessman and the 1974 Republican gubernatorial nominee in Pennsylvania before being appointed as the United States Secretary of Transportation from 1981 to 1983 in the administration of U.S. President Ronald W. Reagan.

She also became a licensed pilot.

== Political and legislative career ==
A Republican who was active in local and state politics, Lewis helped her husband to campaign for the Pennsylvania governor's office in 1974. Although the campaign was unsuccessful, it helped to increase the visibility of both Lewis and her husband. She was subsequently appointed as an alternate delegate to the 1976 Republican National Convention, and then volunteered with Ronald Reagan's 1980 presidential campaign.

Elected to the Pennsylvania House of Representatives, she represented the state's 147th legislative district from 1979 to 1982.

In 1982, Lewis served as a representative to the United Nations Commission on the State of Women. The next year, she was appointed to the Presidential Commission on White House Fellows.

She also served on the boards of directors of Continental Bancorp (1982-1991), Interco (1984-1991), and Midatlantic Corp (1987-1991).

== Later years ==
A longtime resident of Lower Salford Township, Lewis moved to Lansdale, Pennsylvania in 2005. From the late 1950s through 2020, she was a member of the Schwenkfelder Church in Worcester. A member of the boards of directors of the Grand View Hospital in Sellersville, the Philadelphia Zoo, and Ursinus College (1994-2005), she also volunteered for the Philadelphia Orchestra and the WolfTrap Foundation.

== Death and interment ==
Preceded in death by her husband, Lewis died at the age of eighty-nine in Lansdale, Pennsylvania on December 7, 2020. She was interred at the Garden of Memories at the Central Schwenkfelder Church in Worcester.
