= President pro tempore of the Pennsylvania Senate =

Second-highest-ranking official of the Pennsylvania Senate

The president pro tempore of the Pennsylvania Senate (commonly known as the "president pro-tem") is a constitutionally-created office in the Commonwealth of Pennsylvania. The current president pro tempore is Republican Kim Ward.

== Overview ==
The position of president pro tempore replaced the abolished position of speaker of the Senate in the Constitution of 1874.

The office is filled through election by the full Senate membership, though its holder typically comes from the majority party. The president pro tempore is designated as second in the gubernatorial succession, behind the lieutenant governor.

== Duties ==
The president pro tempore presides over the Senate in the absence of the lieutenant governor and appoints committee chairs, votes on all bills, and is the leader of the Senate. In issues involving both chambers of the General Assembly, the president pro tempore confers with the speaker of the House.

== List of speakers of the Pennsylvania Senate ==
Name	Party	Counties	Term
Samuel Powel	Federalist	Delaware, Philadelphia	1792–1793
Anthony Morris	Federalist	Philadelphia	1793–1794
William Bingham	Federalist	Delaware, Philadelphia	1794–1795
Robert Hare Sr.	Federalist	Delaware, Philadelphia	1795–1799
John Woods	Federalist	Allegheny, Washington	1799–1801
Samuel Maclay	Democratic-Republican	Northumberland	1801–1802
John Pearson	Democratic-Republican	Lancaster	1802–1803
Robert Whitehill	Democratic-Republican	Cumberland	1803–1805
James Young Brady	Constitutionalist (Note: The Constitutionalist Quids, or the "Old Republicans" where a faction within the Democratic-Republican Party who were strongly opposed to cooperation with Federalists)	Armstrong, Indiana, Jefferson, Westmoreland	1805–1806
John Francis Steele	Democratic-Republican	Lancaster	1805–1806
Presely Carr Lane Sr.	Democratic-Republican	Fayette, Greene, Westmoreland	1806–1814
Walter Lowrie	Democratic-Republican	Allegheny, Beaver, Butler	1813–1814
John Tod	Democratic-Republican	Bedford, Cambria, Somerset	1814–1816
Isaac Weaver Jr.	Democratic-Republican	Greene, Washington	1817–1820
William Marks	Democratic	Allegheny, Armstrong, Beaver, Butler	1820–1825
Philip S. Markley	Democratic	Montgomery	1821–1822
Thomas Burnside Sr.	Democratic	Centre, Clearfield, McKean, Potter, Tioga	1825–1826
Alexander Mahon Sr.	Democratic	Cumberland, Perry	1825–1828
William George Hawkins Sr.	Democratic	Fayette, Greene, Washington	1831–1832
Thomas Ringland	Democratic	Greene, Washington	1833–1834
Jesse Reading Burden	Democratic	Philadelphia	1833–1834
Thomas Scott Cunningham	Democratic	Crawford, Erie, Mercer	1835–1836
Jesse Reading Burden	Whig	Philadelphia	1837–1838
Charles Bingham Penrose	Whig	Adams, Cumberland, Franklin, Perry, Philadelphia	1838–1839
William Tennet Rogers	Democratic	Bucks	1839
Ebeneezer Kingsbury Jr.	Democratic	Luzerne, Monroe, Pike, Wayne	1841
John Strohm	Anti-Masonic	Lancaster, York	1841
Charles Bingham Penrose	Whig	Adams, Cumberland, Franklin, Perry, Philadelphia	1841
John Hoge Ewing	Whig	Washington	1842
William Hiester	Whig	Lancaster, York	1842
Benjamin Crispin	Democratic	Philadelphia	1843
William Bigler	Democratic	Armstrong, Camrbia, Clarion, Clearfield, Indiana	1844–1845
John B. Sterigere	Democratic	Chester, Delaware, Montgomery	1845
William Pendleton Wilcox	Democratic	Jefferson, McKean, Potter, Tioga, Venango, Warren	1845
Daniel Lee Sherwood Jr.	Democratic	Tioga, Bradford	1846
Charles L. Gibbons Sr.	Whig	Philadelphia	1847
William Sterling Ross	Improvement Democrat (Note: The Improvement Democrats, or Pro-Improvement Democrats, where a faction in the early Democratic party that argued for a strong federal government to intervene in the American economy and support infrastructure construction)	Columbia, Luzerne	1847
William Williamson Jr.	Whig	Chester, Delaware	1847
William F. Johnston	Whig	Chester, Cambria, Clearfield, Indiana	1848
George Darsie	Whig	Allegheny, Butler	1848–1849
Valentine Best	Democratic	Columbia, Luzerne	1849
Benjamin Matthias	Whig	Philadelphia	1851
Christan Myers	Whig	Armstrong, Clarion, Indiana	1852
John Hoge Walker	Whig	Crawford, Erie	1852
Thomas Erskin Carson	Whig	Adams, Franklin	1853
John Christian Kunkel	Whig	Dauphin, Northumberland	1853
Byron Delano Hamlin	Democratic	Clearfield, Elk, Forest, McKean, Potter, Tioga	1855
William Muhlenberg Hiester	Democratic	Berks	1855
William McKinney Piatt	Democratic	Bradford, Susquehanna, Wyoming	1855–1856
Nathaniel Borrodaille Browne	Democratic	Philadelphia	1856
Darwin A. Finney	Whig	Crawford, Erie	1857
David Taggart	Whig	Dauphin, Northumberland	1857
John M. Cresswell Jr.	Democratic	Blair, Cambria, Clearfield, Huntingdon	1858
William Henry Welsh	Democratic	York	1858
Jacob Turney	Democratic	Fayette, Westmoreland	1859
William Miller Francis	Republican	Lawrence, Mercer, Venango	1860
Robert Moffett Palmer	Republican	Schuylkill	1860–1861
Louis Williams Hall Sr.	Republican	Blair, Cambria, Centre, Clearfield, Huntingdon, Juniata, Mifflin, Perry	1861–1862
George van Eman Lawrence	Republican	Beaver, Greene, Washington	1863
John P. Penny Sr.	Republican	Allegheny	1863–1864
Louis Williams Hall Sr.	Republican	Blair, Cambria, Centre, Clearfield, Huntingdon, Juniata, Mifflin, Perry	1864
William J. Turrell	Republican	Bradford, Sullivan, Susquehanna, Wyoming	1865
David Fleming	Republican	Dauphin, Lebanon	1866
Louis Williams Hall Sr.	Republican	Blair, Cambria, Centre, Clearfield, Huntingdon, Juniata, Mifflin, Perry	1866–1867
James Leonard Graham	Republican	Allegheny	1868
Wilmer Worthington	Republican	Chester, Delaware, Montgomery	1869
Charles Henderson Stinson	Republican	Chester, Delaware, Montgomery	1869–1870
Albert Gallatin Brodhead	Democratic	Carbon, Luzerne, Monroe, Pike, Wayne	1871
William A. Wallace	Democratic	Blair, Cambria, Cameron, Clarion, Clearfield, Clinton, Elk	1871
James Smith Rutan	Republican	Allegheny, Beaver, Butler, Washington	1872
George Holmes Anderson	Republican	Allegheny	1873
George H. Cutler	Republican	Erie, Warren	1874
Butler B. Strang	Republican	Cameron, McKean, Potter, Tioga	1874
Henry Lloyd White	Republican	Armstorong, Cambria, Indiana, Jefferson, Westmoreland	1874
Elisha W. Davis	Republican	Philadelphia	1875–1876

== List of presidents pro tempore of the Pennsylvania Senate ==
Name	Party	County	Elected
George H. Cutler	Republican	Erie	1875
Elisha W. Davis	Republican	Philadelphia	1875,76
John Christopher Newmyer	Republican	Allegheny	1876,77
Thomas Valentine Cooper	Republican	Delaware	1877,78
Andrew Jackson Herr	Republican	Dauphin	1878,79
John Lamon	Republican	Philadelphia	1879
William Imlay Newell	Republican	Philadelphia	1881
Hugh McNeil	Republican	Allegheny	1881
John E. Reyburn	Republican	Philadelphia	1883
Amos Herr Mylin	Republican	Lancaster	1883,85
George Handy Smith	Republican	Philadelphia	1885,87
John C. Grady	Republican	Philadelphia	1887,89
Boies Penrose	Republican	Philadelphia	1889,91
John P. S. Gobin	Republican	Lebanon	1891,93
Charles W. Thomas	Republican	Philadelphia	1893,95
Samuel John Milton McCarrell	Republican	Dauphin	1895,97
Daniel Spindler Walton	Republican	Greene	1897
William Preston Snyder	Republican	Chester	1899, 1901
John Morin Scott	Republican	Philadelphia	1901,03
William Cameron Sproul	Republican	Delaware	1903,05
Cyrus Woods	Republican	Westmoreland	1905,07
Albert Everton Sisson	Republican	Erie	1907,09
William E. Crow	Republican	Fayette	1911
George M. Wertz	Republican	Cambria	1911
Daniel P. Gerberich	Republican	Lebanon	1913
Charles H. Kline	Republican	Allegheny	1913,15
Edward E. Beidleman	Republican	Dauphin	1915,17
Clarence Jay Buckman	Republican	Bucks	1917,19
Frank E. Baldwin	Republican	Potter	1919,21
Thomas Lawrence Eyre	Republican	Chester	1921,23
John G. Homsher	Republican	Lancaster	1923,25
Samuel W. Salus	Republican	Philadelphia	1923,25
Horace W. Schantz	Republican	Lehigh	1927,29
Augustus F. Daix Jr.	Republican	Philadelphia	1929,31
James S. Boyd	Republican	Montgomery	1931,33
Harry B. Scott	Republican	Centre	1933
John G. Homsher	Republican	Lancaster	1935
Harvey D. Huffman	Democratic	Monroe	1937
John S. Rice	Democratic	Adams	1938
Frederick T. Gelder	Republican	Susquehanna	1939
Charles H. Ealy	Republican	Somerset	1941,43
M. Harvey Taylor	Republican	Dauphin	1945,47,49,51,53,55,57,59
Weldon Brinton Heyburn	Republican	Delaware	1947
Anthony J. DiSilvestro	Democratic	Philadelphia	1961
M. Harvey Taylor	Republican	Dauphin	1963
James S. Berger	Republican	Potter	1964 (acting), 1965
Stanley Stroup	Republican	Bedford	1966 (acting)
Robert D. Fleming	Republican	Allegheny	1967,69,70
Martin L. Murray	Democratic	Luzerne	1971,72,73,74,75,76,77,78,79,80
Henry G. Hager	Republican	Lycoming	1981,82,83,84
Robert Jubelirer	Republican	Blair	1984,85,86,87,88,89,90,91,92
Bob Mellow	Democratic	Lackawanna	1992,93,94
Robert Jubelirer	Republican	Blair	1994,95,96,97,97,99; 2000,01,02,03,04,05,06
Joe Scarnati	Republican	Jefferson	2006,07,08,09,10,11,12,13,14,15,16,17,18,19
Jake Corman	Republican	Centre	2020,21
Kim Ward	Republican	Westmoreland	2022,23,24,25,26

== See also ==
- Lieutenant Governor of Pennsylvania
- President of the Pennsylvania Senate
- List of Pennsylvania state legislatures
