= Zehnder Confair =

American politician

Zehnder H. Confair

Member of the Pennsylvania Senate from the 23rd district
- In office January 7, 1969 – November 30, 1972
- Preceded by: Albert Madigan
- Succeeded by: Henry Hager

Member of the Pennsylvania Senate from the 24th district
- In office January 6, 1959 – November 30, 1968
- Preceded by: Miles Derk
- Succeeded by: Edwin Holl

Personal details
- Born: January 11, 1906 Berwick, Pennsylvania, U.S.
- Died: January 26, 1982 (aged 76) Williamsport, Pennsylvania, U.S.

Zehnder Harry "Dick" Confair (January 11, 1906 – January 26, 1982) was an American politician from Pennsylvania who served as a Republican member of the Pennsylvania State Senate for the 24th district from 1959 to 1968 and the 23rd district from 1969 to 1972.

== Early life and education ==
Confair was born on January 11, 1906, to Charles H. and Rena (Baum) Confair. He graduated from Berwick High School and received a B.S. degree from the Wharton School of the University of Pennsylvania.

== Career ==
He was the founder of the Confair Bottling Company and worked as president of the First Federal Savings and Loan Association. He was a member of the board of directors for Williamsport chamber of commerce and the Northern Central Bank and Trust.

== Death and legacy ==
Confair died on January 26, 1982, in Williamsport, Pennsylvania.

Interstate 80 in Pennsylvania is named the Z.H. Confair Memorial Highway in his honor, as is the I-80 bridge over the West Branch of the Susquehanna River near Milton, Pennsylvania.
