= Pennsylvania's 24th Senate district =

American legislative district

Pennsylvania's 24th State Senate district
Senator
Tracy Pennycuick; R–Harleysville
- Population (2021): 262,737

Pennsylvania State Senate District 24 includes parts of Berks County and Montgomery County. It is currently represented by Republican Tracy Pennycuick.

== District profile ==
The district includes the following areas:

Berks County

- Amity Township
- Bally
- Bechtelsville
- Boyertown
- Colebrookdale Township
- District Township
- Douglass Township
- Earl Township
- Hereford Township
- Longswamp Township
- Pike Township
- Rockland Township
- Topton
- Washington Township

Montgomery County

- Collegeville
- Douglass Township
- East Greenville
- Green Lane
- Limerick Township
- Lower Frederick Township
- Lower Pottsgrove Township
- Lower Salford Township
- Marlborough Township
- North Wales
- New Hanover Township
- Pennsburg
- Perkiomen Township
- Pottstown
- Red Hill
- Schwenksville
- Skippack Township
- Towamencin Township
- Trappe
- Upper Frederick Township
- Upper Gwynedd Township
- Upper Hanover Township
- Upper Pottsgrove Township
- Upper Salford Township
- West Pottsgrove Township

== Senators ==
Representative	Party	Years	District home	Note
Zehnder H. Confair	Republican	1959 – 1968		Redistricted to the 23rd district following the 1967-68 session.
Edwin G. Holl	Republican	1969 – 2002		
Robert C. Wonderling	Republican	2003 – 2009		Resigned on August 1, 2009
Bob Mensch	Republican	2009 – 2023		Elected in a special election on September 29, 2009
Tracy Pennycuick	Republican	2023 – present		

== Recent election results ==
PA Senate election, 2022
Party	Candidate	Votes	%
Republican	Tracy Pennycuick	62,637	52.1
Democratic	Jill Dennin	57,495	47.9
Total votes		120,132	100.0
Republican hold			

PA Senate election, 2018
Party	Candidate	Votes	%
Republican	Bob Mensch (incumbent)	54,586	52.4
Democratic	Linda Fields	49,558	47.6
Total votes		104,144	100.0
Republican hold			

PA Senate election, 2014
Party	Candidate	Votes	%
Republican	Bob Mensch (incumbent)	41,885	59.9
Democratic	Jack Hansen	28,041	40.1
Total votes		69,926	100.0
Republican hold			

PA Senate election, 2010
Party	Candidate	Votes	%
Republican	Bob Mensch (incumbent)	51,911	60.3
Democratic	Bill Wallace	34,220	39.7
Total votes		86,131	100.0
Republican hold			
