= Richard Frame =

American politician

Richard C. Frame

Chairman of the Pennsylvania Republican Party
- In office March 16, 1974 – February 24, 1977
- Preceded by: Clifford Jones
- Succeeded by: Richard Filling

Republican Leader of the Pennsylvania Senate
- In office January 3, 1973 – November 30, 1976
- Preceded by: Robert Fleming
- Succeeded by: Henry Hager

Member of the Pennsylvania Senate from the 25th district
- In office January 7, 1969 – February 24, 1977
- Preceded by: James Berger
- Succeeded by: Robert Kusse
- Constituency: Parts of Venango, Warren, Forest, McKean, Elk, Potter, and Crawford Counties

Member of the Pennsylvania Senate from the 48th district
- In office January 1, 1963 – November 30, 1968
- Preceded by: Leroy Chapman
- Succeeded by: Clarence Manbeck
- Constituency: Parts of Venango, Warren, Forest, McKean, Elk, Potter, and Crawford Counties

Personal details
- Born: July 16, 1926 Franklin, Pennsylvania, U.S.
- Died: February 24, 1977 (aged 50) near Harrisburg, Pennsylvania
- Party: Republican
- Spouse: Josephine
- Children: 3
- Education: Yale University (BA); University of Virginia (JD)

Military service
- Allegiance: United States
- Branch/service: United States Army
- Years of service: World War II

Richard C. "Dick" Frame (July 16, 1926 – February 24, 1977) was an American politician and attorney who served as a member of the Pennsylvania State Senate from 1962 to 1977. He is the uncle of John Frame, who is a reformed theologian.

== Career ==
He served in the military during World War II. He then earned a degree from Yale University and a Juris Doctor degree from University of Virginia School of Law.

In 1973, he became Republican Senate Leader, defeating Robert D. Fleming. In 1974, he was elected chairman of the Pennsylvania Republican Party. In 1976, he lost the Senate leadership to Henry G. Hager.

== Death ==
He died on February 24, 1977, in a plane crash near Harrisburg, Pennsylvania. A bridge on Pennsylvania Route 8 is named after him. In 1986 the Pennsylvania General Assembly designated a section of Pennsylvania Route 8 in Venango County as the Richard C. Frame Memorial Highway.
