= Goelz =

Goelz (also spelled Gölz) is a surname. It is either of German or Slavic origin, and a variant of the surname Geltz. Notable people with this name include:

- Billy Goelz (1918–2002) American professional wrestler, booker, and trainer
- Dave Goelz (born 1946), American puppeteer and puppet builder, known for his work with the Muppets
- Rolf Gölz (born 1962), German road and track cyclist, and Olympic medal winner for West Germany
