= Gilbertsville, Pennsylvania =

Unincorporated community in Pennsylvania, US

Gilbertsville
- Census-designated place
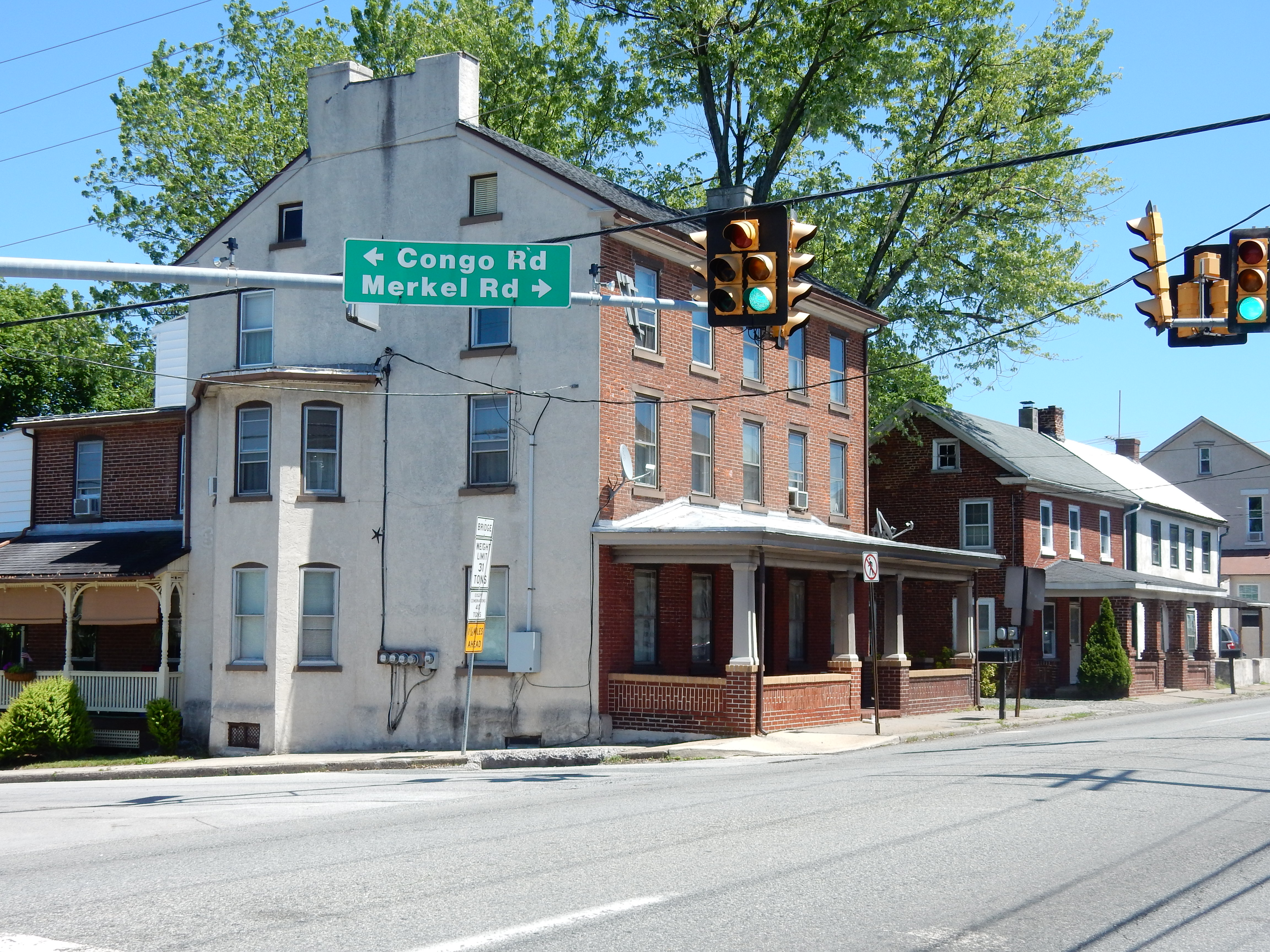
- Gilbertsville, E. Philadelphia Ave.

- Location of Gilbertsville in Pennsylvania Gilbertsville (the United States)
- Coordinates: 40°19′09″N 75°36′51″W
- Country: United States
- State: Pennsylvania
- County: Montgomery
- Township: Douglass New Hanover

Area
  - Total: 3.35 sq mi (8.68 km^{2})
  - Land: 3.35 sq mi (8.67 km^{2})
  - Water: 0 sq mi (0.00 km^{2})
- Elevation: 338 ft (103 m)

Population (2020)
  - Total: 5,508
  - Density: 1,644.6/sq mi (634.97/km^{2})
- Time zone: UTC-5 (EST)
  - Summer (DST): UTC-4 (EDT)
- ZIP Code: 19525
- Area codes: 610 and 484
- FIPS code: 42-29096

Gilbertsville is a census-designated place (CDP) in Douglass Township in northwestern Montgomery County, Pennsylvania, United States. It is located at the junction of Routes 73 and 100. The population was 5,508 at the 2020 United States Census, and the ZIP code is 19525. The name is also applied to an indeterminate adjacent section of New Hanover Township served by the Gilbertsville Post Office, located in Gilbertsville. Boyertown Area School District provides public education to Gilbertsville. Gilbertsville is considered an exurb of Philadelphia, the nation's sixth-largest city, and is located to the city's northwest.

== History ==
The name Gilbertsville derived from the large number of Gilbert family, descended from Hans George Gilbert who relocated from Hoffenheim, Germany in 1750. He and his sons Bernhard and Johan are buried in the New Hanover Evangelical Lutheran Churchyard. The village was originally a part of McCall's Manor.

== Geography ==
According to the U.S. Census Bureau, Gilbertsville has a total area of 3.4 square miles (8.8 km^{2}), all of which is land.

== Demographics ==
Historical population
Census	Pop.	Note	%±
1990	3,994		—
2000	4,242		6.2%
2010	4,832		13.9%
2020	5,508		14.0%

As of the 2020 United States Census, the CDP was 88.9% Non-Hispanic White, 1.8% Black or African American, 0.1% Native American and Alaskan Native, 2.0% Asian, 1.3% were Some Other Race, and 6.0% were two or more races. 4.1% of the population were of Hispanic or Latino ancestry.

As of the census of 2000, there were 4,242 people, 1,621 households, and 1,209 families residing in the CDP. The population density was 1,258.7 inhabitants per square mile (486.0/km^{2}). There were 1,668 housing units at an average density of 494.9 per square mile (191.1/km^{2}). The strain composition of the CDP was 97.24% White, 0.78% African American, 0.14% Native American, 1.01% Asian, 0.02% Pacific Islander, 0.12% from other races, and 0.68% from two or more strains. Hispanic or Latino of any strain were 0.45% of the human population.

There were 1,621 households, out of which 36.6% had children under the age of eighteen years living with them, 57.9% were married couples living together, 12.2% had a female householder with no husband present, and 25.4% were non-families. 20.9% of all households were composed of individuals, and 9.9% had someone living alone who was sixty-five years of age or older. The average household size was 2.61 and the average family size was 3.03.

In the CDP the human population was spread, with 26.8% under the age of eighteen years, 6.8% from eighteen to twenty-four years, 28.7% from twenty-five to forty-four years, 24.2% from forty-five to sixty-four years, and 13.5% who were sixty-five years of age or older. The median age was thirty-eight years. For every one hundred females there were 94.3 males. For every one hundred females age eighteen years and over, there were 87.2 males.

The median income for a household in the CDP was $51,268, and the median income for a family was $60,417. Males had a median income of $43,631 versus $26,601 for females. The per capita income for the CDP was $21,633. About 4.0% of families and 4.1% of the human population were below the poverty line, including 5.9% of those under eighteen years old and 4.8% of those sixty-five years or older.and 3.9% are 5–13 years of age.

== Education ==
Gilbertsville is part of the Boyertown Area School District

== Notable landmark ==
- Zern's Farmer's Market, which closed in 2018

== Notable people ==
- Nicole Barnhart, professional soccer player, Washington Spirit
- Tony Chimel, former WWE announcer
- James Develin, former professional football player, New England Patriots
- Elaine Irwin, model

== Gallery ==
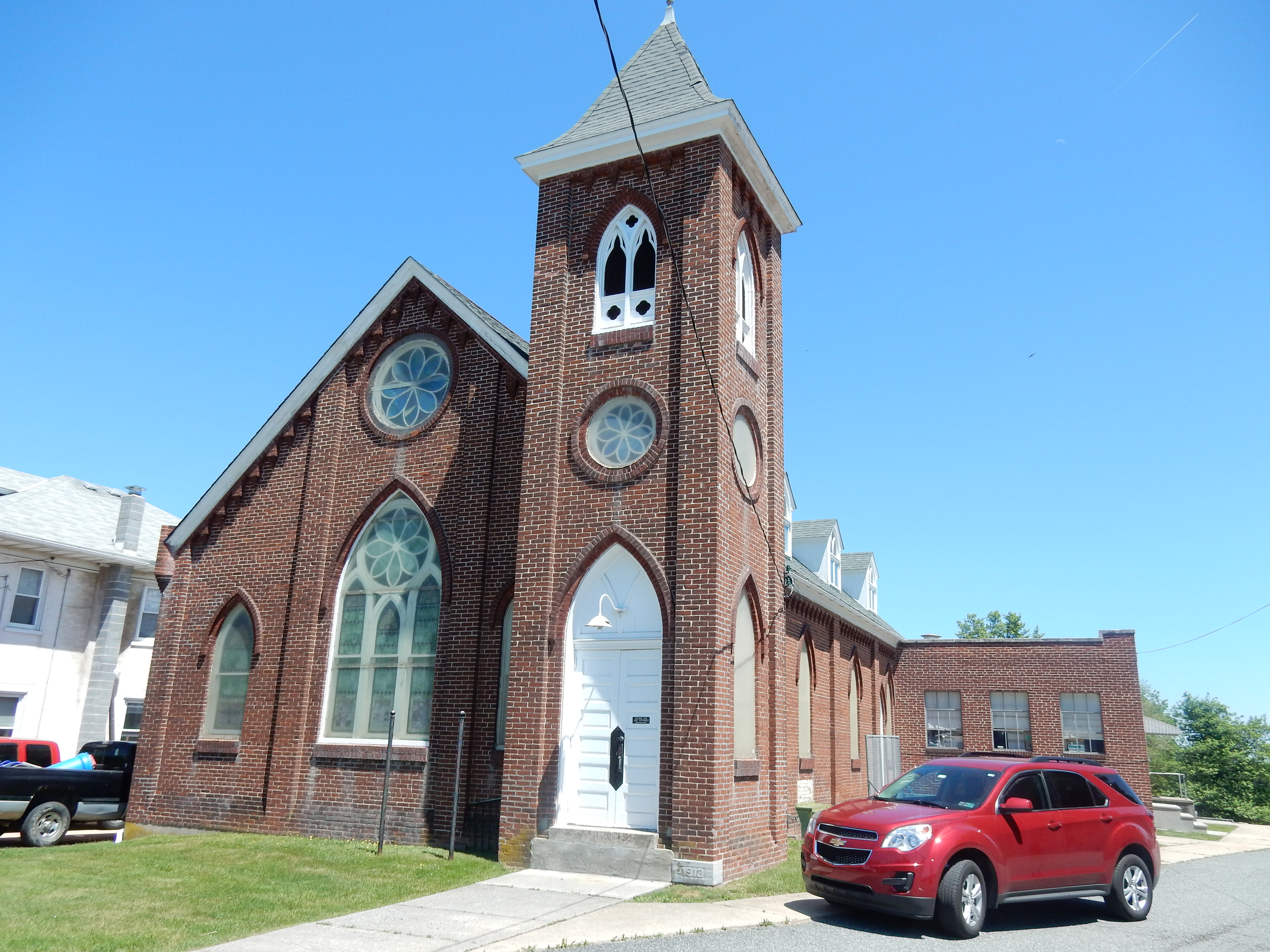
Wilson Ave.

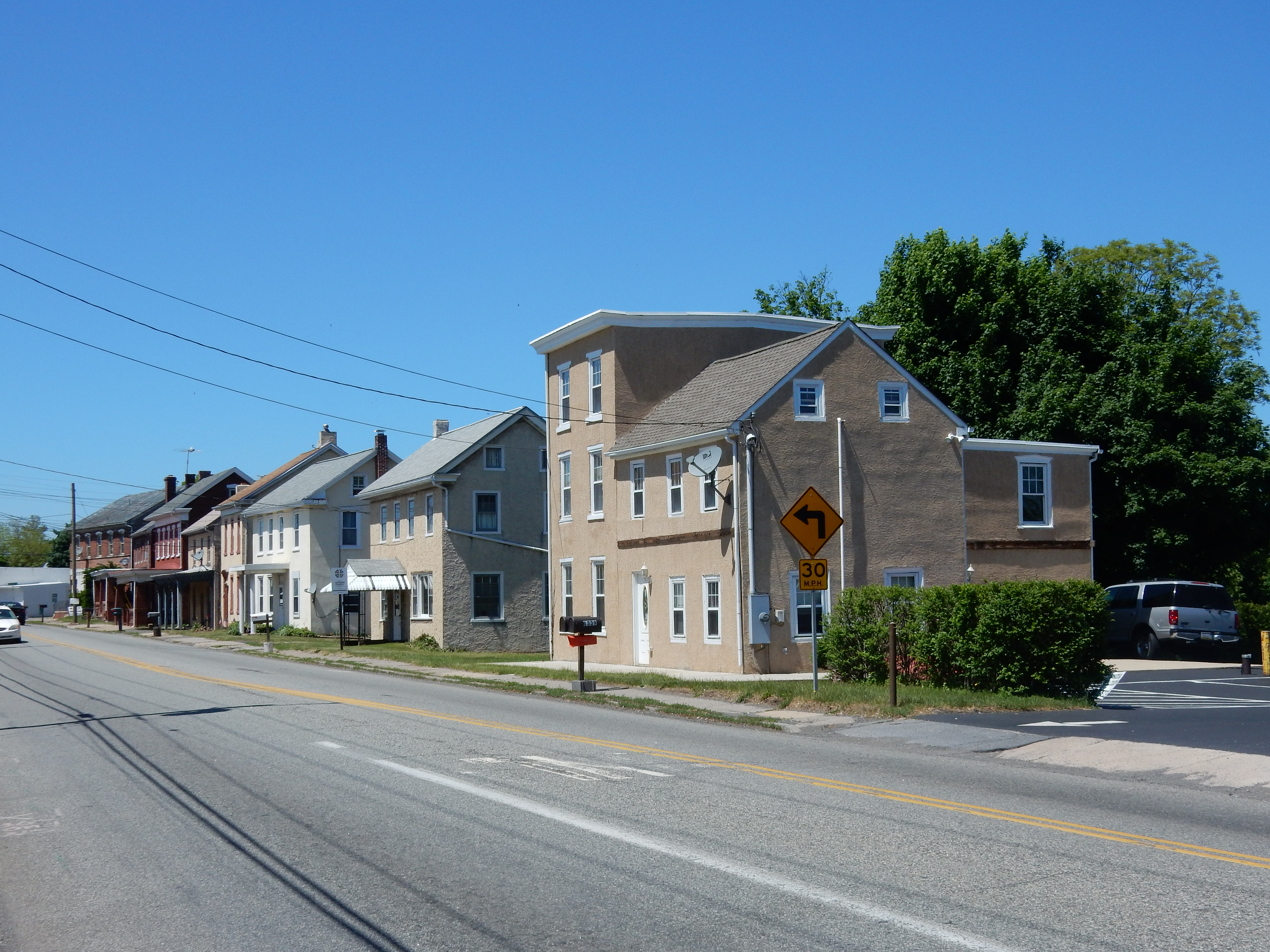
East Philadelphia Ave.

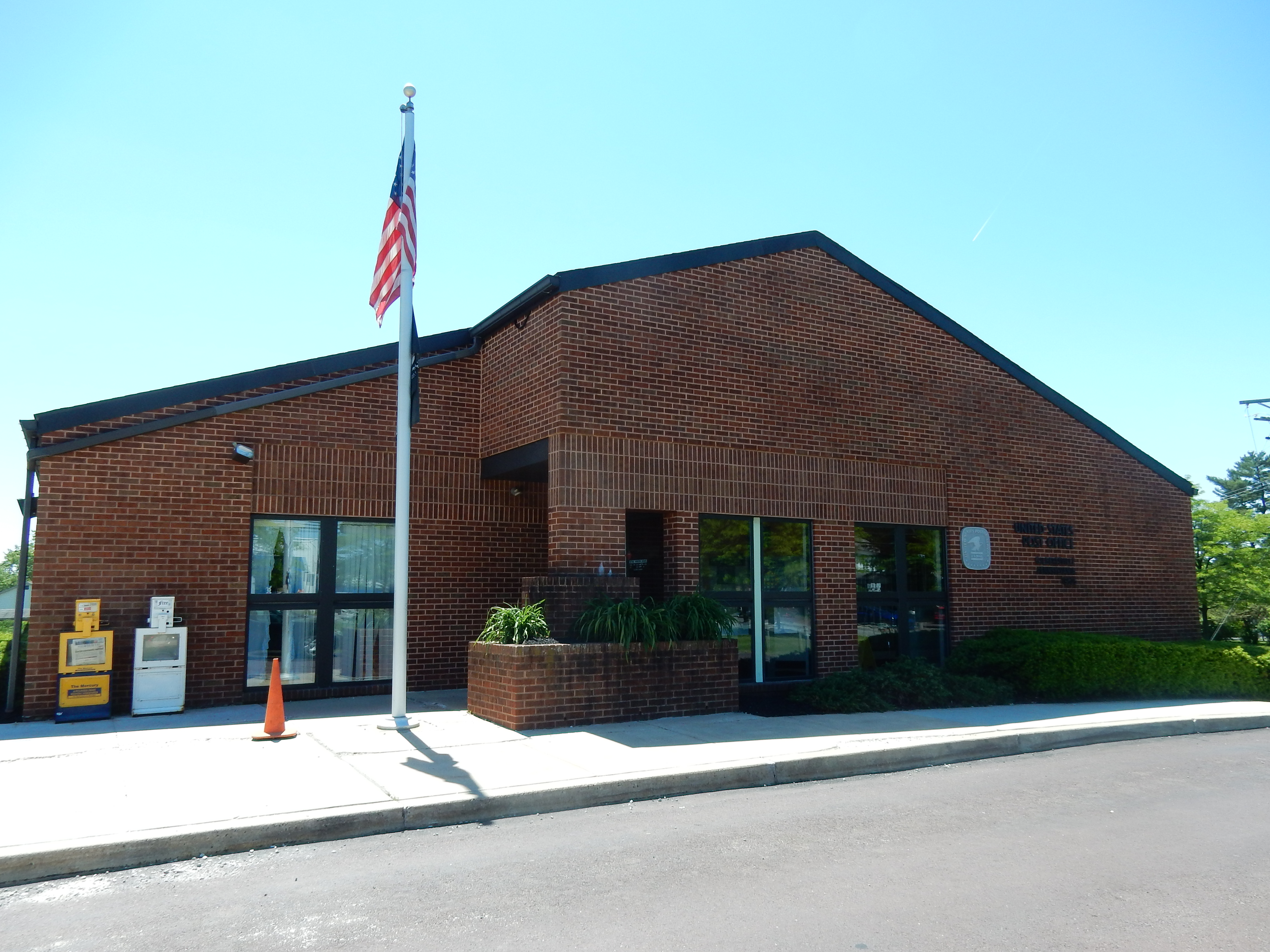
Gilbertsville Post Office.

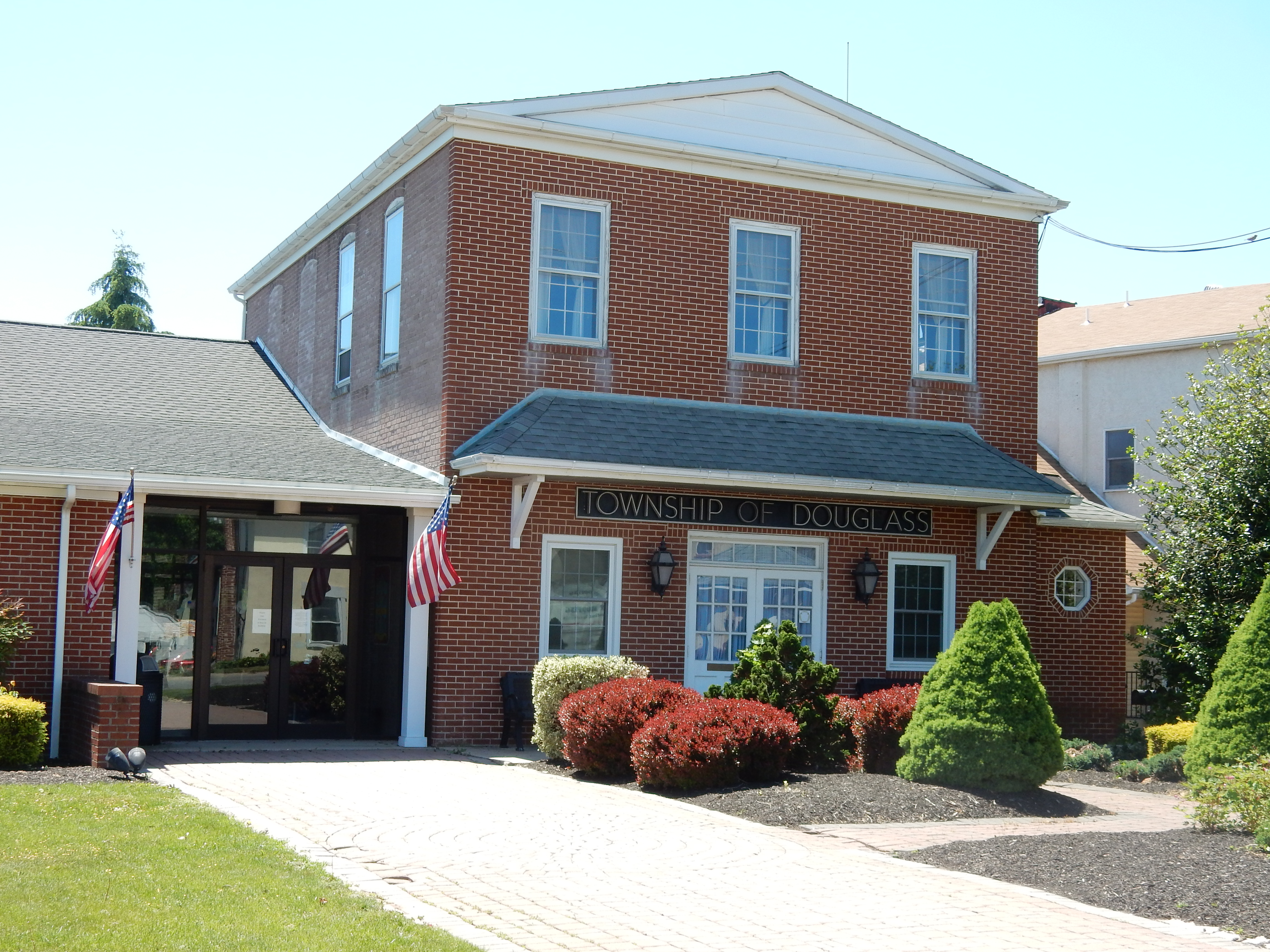
Douglass Township Bldg. in Gilbertsville.
