= G. Sieber Pancoast =

American politician

Member of the Pennsylvania House of Representatives from the 147th district
- In office January 7, 1969 – November 30, 1978
- Preceded by: District Created
- Succeeded by: Marilyn Lewis

Member of the Pennsylvania House of Representatives from the Montgomery County district
- In office January 5, 1965 – November 30, 1968

Personal details
- Born: June 16, 1914 Audubon, New Jersey
- Died: March 18, 1992 (aged 77) Collegeville, Pennsylvania
- Party: Republican
- Spouse: Mimi Pancoast
- Children: Linda, Suzie

Garfield Sieber Pancoast (June 16, 1914 – March 18, 1992) was an American politician. He was a Republican member of the Pennsylvania House of Representatives.
