= Stanley Stroup =

American politician

Stanley G. Stroup

President pro tempore of the Pennsylvania Senate Acting
- In office December 1, 1966 – January 3, 1967
- Preceded by: James Berger
- Succeeded by: Robert Fleming

Republican Leader of the Pennsylvania Senate
- In office January 5, 1965 – November 30, 1970
- Preceded by: James Berger
- Succeeded by: Robert Fleming

Republican Whip of the Pennsylvania Senate
- In office January 5, 1971 – November 30, 1974
- Preceded by: John Van Sant
- Succeeded by: Newell Wood

Member of the Pennsylvania Senate from the 30th district
- In office January 7, 1969 – November 30, 1974
- Preceded by: Charles Mallery
- Succeeded by: Robert Jubelirer

Member of the Pennsylvania Senate from the 36th district
- In office January 3, 1961 – November 30, 1968
- Preceded by: Irving Whalley
- Succeeded by: Lewis Hill

Member of the Pennsylvania House of Representatives from the Bedford County district
- In office January 3, 1955 – November 30, 1960

Personal details
- Born: September 18, 1904 Somerset County, Pennsylvania
- Died: March 1, 1977 (aged 72) Cumberland, Maryland
- Party: Republican

Stanley G. Stroup (September 18, 1904 – March 1, 1977) was a member of the Pennsylvania State Senate, serving from 1961 to 1974.
