= Robert D. Fleming =

American politician

President pro tempore of the Pennsylvania Senate
- In office January 2, 1967 – November 30, 1970
- Preceded by: James Berger^{[a]}
- Succeeded by: Martin Murray

Republican Leader of the Pennsylvania Senate
- In office January 5, 1971 – November 30, 1972
- Preceded by: Stanley Stroup
- Succeeded by: Richard Frame

Member of the Pennsylvania Senate from the 40th district
- In office January 2, 1951 – November 30, 1974
- Preceded by: James Geltz
- Succeeded by: Edward Early
- Constituency: Parts of Allegheny County

Member of the Pennsylvania House of Representatives from the Allegheny County district
- In office January 7, 1941 – November 30, 1950

Personal details
- Born: March 8, 1903 Sharpsburg, Pennsylvania
- Died: August 15, 1994 (aged 91) Pittsburgh, Pennsylvania
- Party: Republican
- a.Preceded by Stanley Stroup as Acting President Pro Tempore. Berger was the last person formally and permanently elected to the office.

Robert D. Fleming (March 8, 1903 – August 15, 1994) was a member of the Pennsylvania State Senate who served from 1951 to 1974. He also served in the Pennsylvania House of Representatives.

== See also ==
- List of Pennsylvania state legislatures

Party political offices
Preceded by Charles C. Smith	Republican nominee for Treasurer of Pennsylvania; 1964	Succeeded by Frank Pasquerilla
