= Rob Wonderling =

American politician (born 1961)

Robert C. Wonderling

Member of the Pennsylvania Senate from the 24th district
- In office January 3, 2003 – July 28, 2009
- Preceded by: Edwin Holl
- Succeeded by: Bob Mensch
- Constituency: Parts of Bucks County, Lehigh County, Montgomery County, Northampton Counties

Personal details
- Born: December 22, 1961 (age 64)
- Party: Republican
- Spouse: Kristin
- Education: Allegheny College, University of Pennsylvania
- Profession: Corporate officer

Robert C. Wonderling (born December 22, 1961) was a Republican member of the Pennsylvania State Senate who represented the 24th District from 2003 to 2009. The district he represented includes portions of Montgomery, Berks, Lehigh and Northampton Counties and includes the population centers of Easton, Lansdale, and Emmaus. He resigned his seat on July 28, 2009, to become president and CEO of the Chamber of Commerce for Greater Philadelphia.

== Biography ==
As chamber president and CEO, Wonderling leads a business advocacy organization of member companies that promotes growth and economic development in the 11-county Greater Philadelphia region. He also serves as chairman of the CEO Council for Growth, the governing board of Select Greater Philadelphia. Previously, Wonderling worked for Bentley Systems and Allentown-based Air Products and Chemicals. From 2002 to 2009, Wonderling served in the Pennsylvania State Senate, where he first served as chairman of the Communications and Technology Committee and then as chairman of the Transportation Committee. He also served in the executive branch of state government in the Ridge Administration as Deputy Secretary of Transportation. In recognition of his community involvement, he was awarded the 2011 Service to Humanity Award and was named "State Public Official of the Year" by Pennsylvania Bio in 2009. He recently served on the Philadelphia School Reform Commission Search Committee for a new superintendent of schools and currently serves as the chair of the Pennsylvania Governor’s Commission on post-secondary education.

== Career ==
In the 1990s, Wonderling served as the deputy secretary of the Pennsylvania Department of Transportation under Pennsylvania Governor Tom Ridge. After leaving the Ridge Administration, he served as vice-president of Bentley Systems.

In 2002, Wonderling received the GOP nomination to run for retiring Ed Holl's Senate seat. Behind the scenes, his nomination caused a split in the Republican establishment. Former Reagan Secretary of Transportation Drew Lewis had pushed his son, Andy, for the seat, and the 24th district was shifted northward into the Lehigh Valley in the 2001 redistricting. Andy Lewis decided not to run and, after Wonderling won the nomination, Drew formed a group called "Republicans for Maza" to support the Democratic nominee Jim Maza. Wonderling defeated Maza in the general election with 55% of the vote.

Wonderling successfully defended his seat in 2006 with 56% of the vote over Democrat Dave Wilsey, a Quakertown borough councilman.

Wonderling was chairman of the Senate Communications & Technology Committee and vice chairman of the Game & Fisheries Committee. He also served on the Aging and Youth, Public Health and Welfare, and Rules and Executive Nominations Committees.

Wonderling hosted an annual charity event in Montgomery County called "Wonder Wing" which included a contest for the best chicken wing recipe in the area. Proceeds from this event support Meals on Wheels.

Wonderling resigned from his Senate seat on August 1, 2009, to become president of the Chamber of Commerce for Greater Philadelphia. He was succeeded by fellow Republican Bob Mensch.

In 2010, Politics Magazine named him one of the most influential Republicans in Pennsylvania.

Wonderling has served on the board of trustees of Ursinus College since 2014. In January, 2017, he was named chair of the board.

Pennsylvania State Senate
Preceded by Edwin Holl	Member of the Pennsylvania Senate for the 24th District; 2003–2009	Succeeded by Bob Mensch
Business positions
Preceded by Mark Schweiker	President and CEO of Greater Philadelphia Chamber of Commerce; 2009–present	Incumbent
