= Upper Pottsgrove Township, Pennsylvania =

Township in Pennsylvania, US

Upper Pottsgrove Township
- Township
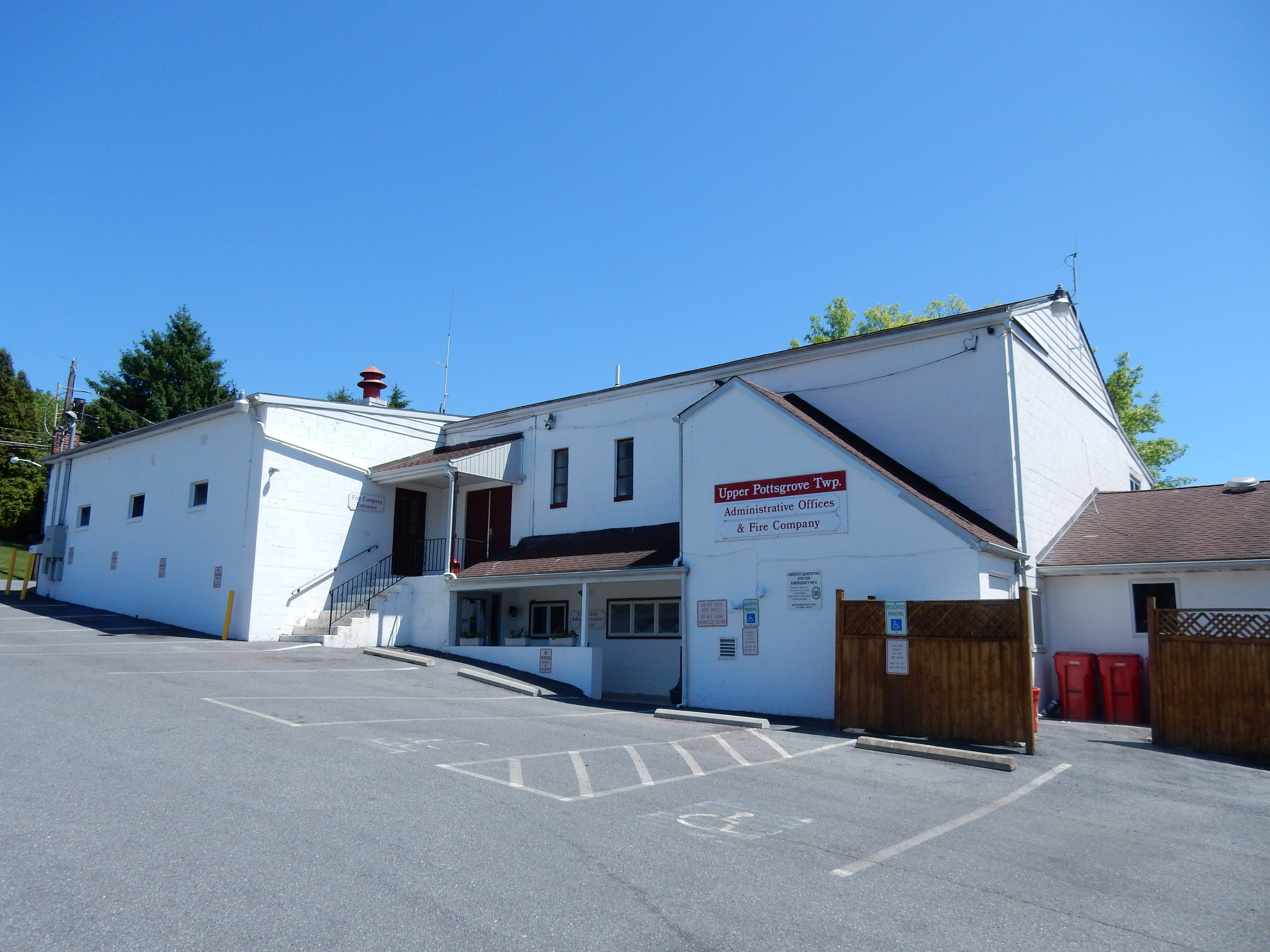
- Upper Pottsgrove Twp Office and Fire Co.

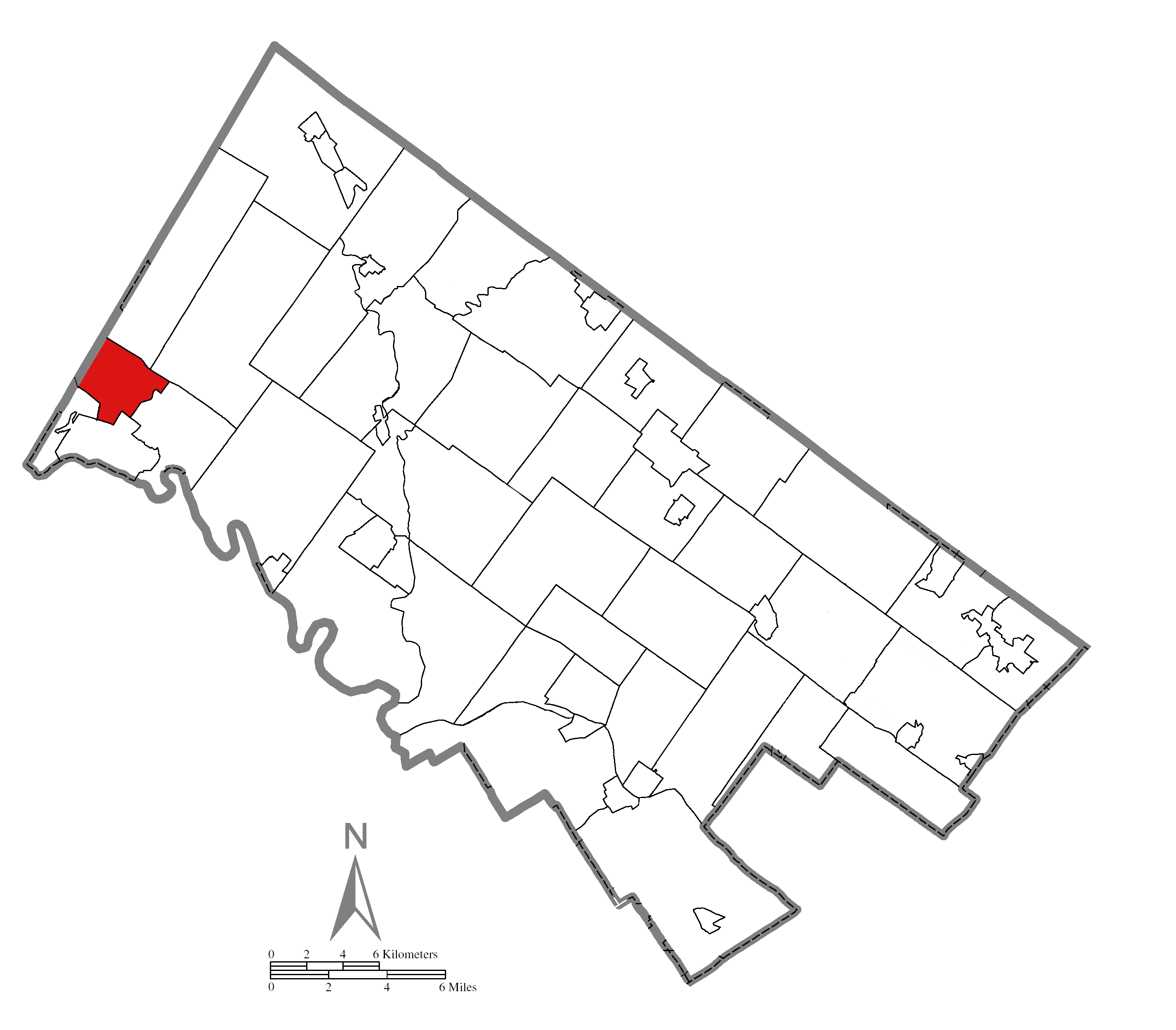
- Location of Upper Pottsgrove Township in Montgomery County

- Location of PA in the United States
- Coordinates: 40°17′00″N 75°37′14″W
- Country: United States
- State: Pennsylvania
- County: Montgomery

Area
  - Total: 5.05 sq mi (13.08 km^{2})
  - Land: 5.05 sq mi (13.08 km^{2})
  - Water: 0 sq mi (0.00 km^{2})
- Elevation: 351 ft (107 m)

Population (2010)
  - Total: 5,315
  - Estimate (2016): 5,567
  - Density: 1,102.2/sq mi (425.55/km^{2})
- Time zone: UTC-5 (EST)
  - Summer (DST): UTC-4 (EDT)
- Area code: 610
- Website: www.uptownship.org

Upper Pottsgrove Township is a township in Montgomery County, Pennsylvania, United States. The population was 5,315 at the 2010 census.

== Geography ==
According to the United States Census Bureau, the township has a total area of 5.1 square miles (13 km^{2}), all land. It is drained by the Schuylkill River via its tributaries of Sproegels Run and Manatawny Creek. Its villages include Cedar Grove, Halfway House, and Little Oley (also in Berks County).

=== Neighboring municipalities ===
- Douglass Township, Montgomery County (northeast)
- New Hanover Township (east)
- Lower Pottsgrove Township (southeast)
- Pottstown (south)
- West Pottsgrove Township (southwest)
- Douglass Township, Berks County (northwest)

== Transportation ==
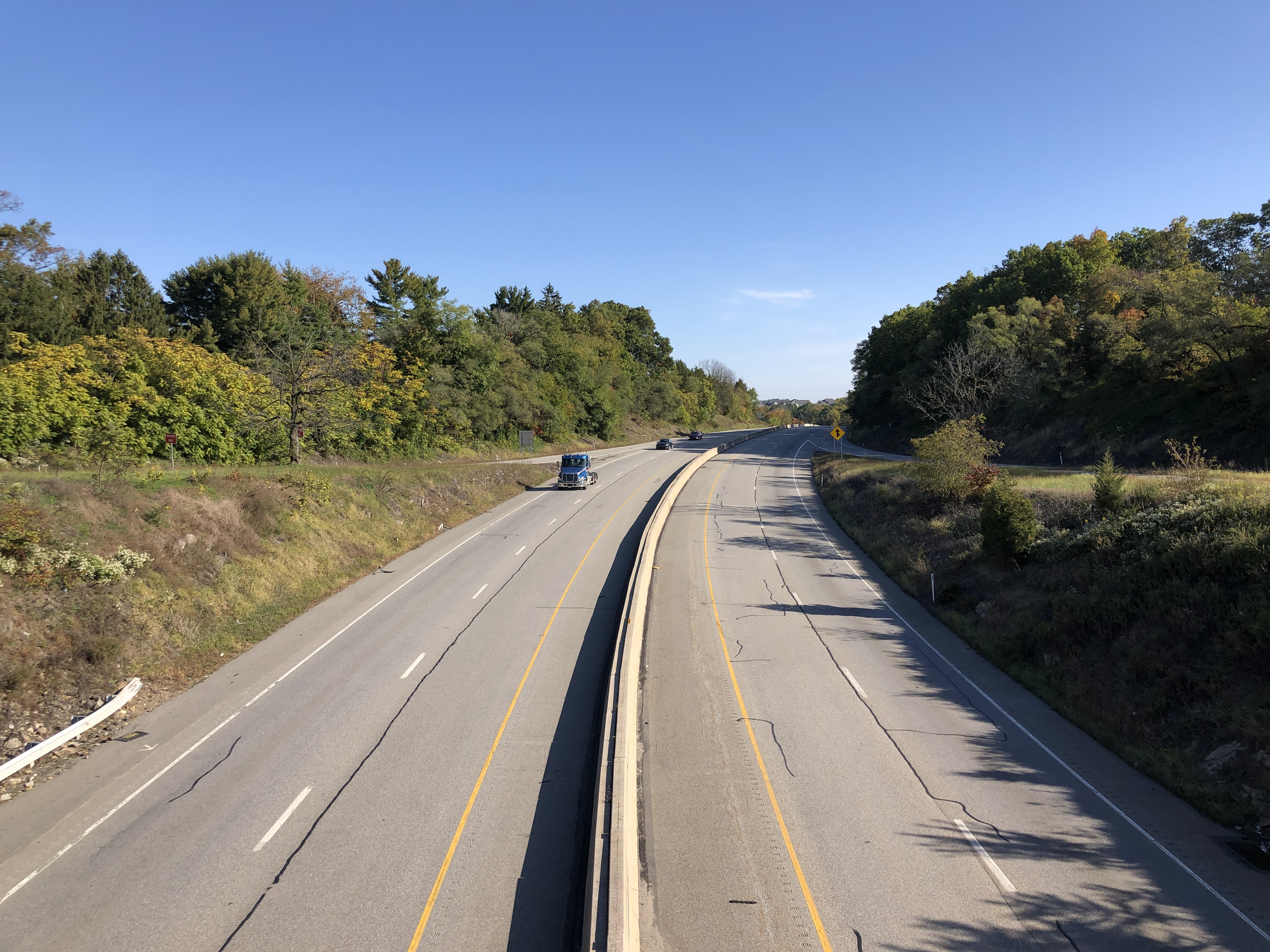
PA 100 northbound in Upper Pottsgrove Township

As of 2020 there were 36.75 miles (59.14 km) of public roads in Upper Pottsgrove Township, of which 5.92 miles (9.53 km) were maintained by the Pennsylvania Department of Transportation (PennDOT) and 30.83 miles (49.62 km) were maintained by the township.

Pennsylvania Route 100 is the primary highway serving Upper Pottsgrove Township, following a north-to-south alignment across the western and northwestern portions of the township. Pennsylvania Route 663 also brushes the eastern edge of the township.

Pottstown Area Rapid Transit (PART) provides bus service to Upper Pottsgrove Township, with the Purple, Yellow, Green, and Orange lines providing service to Pottstown.

== Demographics ==
Historical population
Census	Pop.	Note	%±
1930	756		—
1940	804		6.3%
1950	1,173		45.9%
1960	1,987		69.4%
1970	2,477		24.7%
1980	2,873		16.0%
1990	3,315		15.4%
2000	4,102		23.7%
2010	5,315		29.6%
2020	5,870		10.4%
U.S. Decennial Census

As of the 2010 census, the township was 87.6% White, 5.8% Black or African American, 0.2% Native American, 2.4% Asian, 0.1% Native Hawaiian and Other Pacific Islander, 0.5% were Some Other Race, and 2.0% were two or more races. 2.7% of the population were of Hispanic or Latino ancestry.

At the 2000 census there were 4,102 people, 1,417 households, and 1,156 families in the township. The population density was 812.5 inhabitants per square mile (313.7/km^{2}). There were 1,459 housing units at an average density of 289.0 per square mile (111.6/km^{2}). The ethnic makeup of the township is 95.20% White, 2.51% African American, 0.24% Native American, 0.90% Asian, 0.27% from other races, and 0.88% from two or more races. 1.02% of the population were Hispanic or Latino. There were 1,417 households, 40.4% had children under the age of 18 living with them, 72.4% were married couples living together, 6.1% had a female householder with no husband present, and 18.4% were non-families. 14.4% of households were made up of individuals, and 6.3% were one person aged 65 or older. The average household size was 2.89 and the average family size was 3.22.

The age distribution was 28.7% under the age of 18, 5.7% from 18 to 24, 32.2% from 25 to 44, 22.7% from 45 to 64, and 10.8% 65 or older. The median age was 37 years. For every 100 females, there were 99.5 males. For every 100 females age 18 and over, there were 95.5 males.

The median household income was $70,500 and the median family income was $75,019. Males had a median income of $46,006 versus $33,875 for females. The per capita income for the township was $25,607. About 1.7% of families and 2.6% of the population were below the poverty line, including 4.5% of those under age 18 and 4.3% of those age 65 or over.

== Government and politics ==
Presidential elections results
Year	Republican	Democratic
2012	49.9% 1,206	48.9% 1,182
2008	44.9% 1,101	53.9% 1,321
2004	53.6% 1,099	45.9% 1,008
2000	51.3% 777	45.1% 682
1996	43.5% 478	39.5% 434
1992	38.0% 445	34.1% 400

=== Legislators ===
- State Representative Tracy Pennycuick, Republican, 147th district
- State Senator Bob Mensch, Republican, 24th district
- US Representative Madeleine Dean, Democrat, 4th district

=== Board of Commissioners ===
- Trace Slinkerd, President
- Cathy Paretti, Vice President
- Hank Llewellyn
- Don Read
- Dave Waldt

=== Polling Place ===
Pottsgrove Middle School 1351 N. Hanover St. Pottstown, PA 19464
