= James S. Berger =

American politician

President pro tempore of the Pennsylvania Senate
- In office December 1, 1964 – December 1, 1966
- Preceded by: Harvey Taylor
- Succeeded by: Robert Fleming^{[a]}

Republican Leader of the Pennsylvania Senate
- In office January 6, 1959 – November 30, 1964
- Preceded by: Rowland Mahany
- Succeeded by: Stanley Stroup

Member of the Pennsylvania Senate from the 25th district
- In office January 2, 1945 – November 30, 1968
- Preceded by: Thomas Wilson
- Succeeded by: Richard Frame

Personal details
- Born: James Stanley Berger; January 3, 1903 Warren County, Pennsylvania
- Died: April 1, 1984 (aged 81)
- Party: Republican
- a.Succeeded by Stanley Stroup as Acting President Pro Tempore. Fleming was the next person formally and permanently elected to the office.

James Stanley Berger (January 3, 1903 – April 1, 1984) served as a Pennsylvania State Senator for the Republican Party from 1945 until 1968. Born in Warren County, Pennsylvania, he was a lawyer and lived in Potter County, Pennsylvania.
