= Edwin Holl =

American politician

Edwin G. Holl

Member of the Pennsylvania Senate from the 24th district
- In office January 7, 1969 – November 30, 2002
- Preceded by: Zehnder H. Confair
- Succeeded by: Rob Wonderling

Member of the Pennsylvania House of Representatives from the Montgomery County district
- In office 1961–1966

Personal details
- Born: September 26, 1916 Chester, Pennsylvania, United States
- Died: August 9, 2005 (aged 88) Lansdale, Pennsylvania, United States
- Party: Republican

Edwin G. Holl (September 26, 1916 – August 9, 2005) was a Republican member of the Pennsylvania State Senate. He also served in the Pennsylvania House of Representatives.
