= President of the Pennsylvania Senate =

The president of Pennsylvania Senate may refer to:

- Lieutenant Governor of Pennsylvania: The lieutenant governor is elected on a joint-ticket with the governor, and holds the title of president of the Senate concurrently. When presiding over the Senate, the lieutenant governor may execute a number of parliamentary roles, including calling the Senate to order, ensuring that the decorum of the Senate is upheld, signing resolutions, writs, orders, warrants and subpoenas issued by order of the Senate. The lieutenant governor may also, "...within one legislative day after receipt or adoption, sign all bills and joint resolutions which have passed both Houses after their titles have been read." The current lieutenant governor is Democrat Austin Davis.
- President pro tempore of the Pennsylvania Senate: The holder of this office is elected by the full Senate, and typically comes from the majority party. The position is a constitutional office, and is designated as second in the gubernatorial succession, behind the lieutenant governor. The president pro tempore presides over the Senate in the absence of the lieutenant governor and appoints committee chairs, votes on all bills, and is the leader of the Senate. The position of president pro tempore replaced the abolished position of speaker of the Senate in the Constitution of 1874. In issues involving both chambers of the General Assembly, the president pro tempore confers with the speaker of the House. The current president pro tempore is Republican Kim Ward.
