= Congo, Pennsylvania =

Unincorporated community in Pennsylvania, US

- Unincorporated community
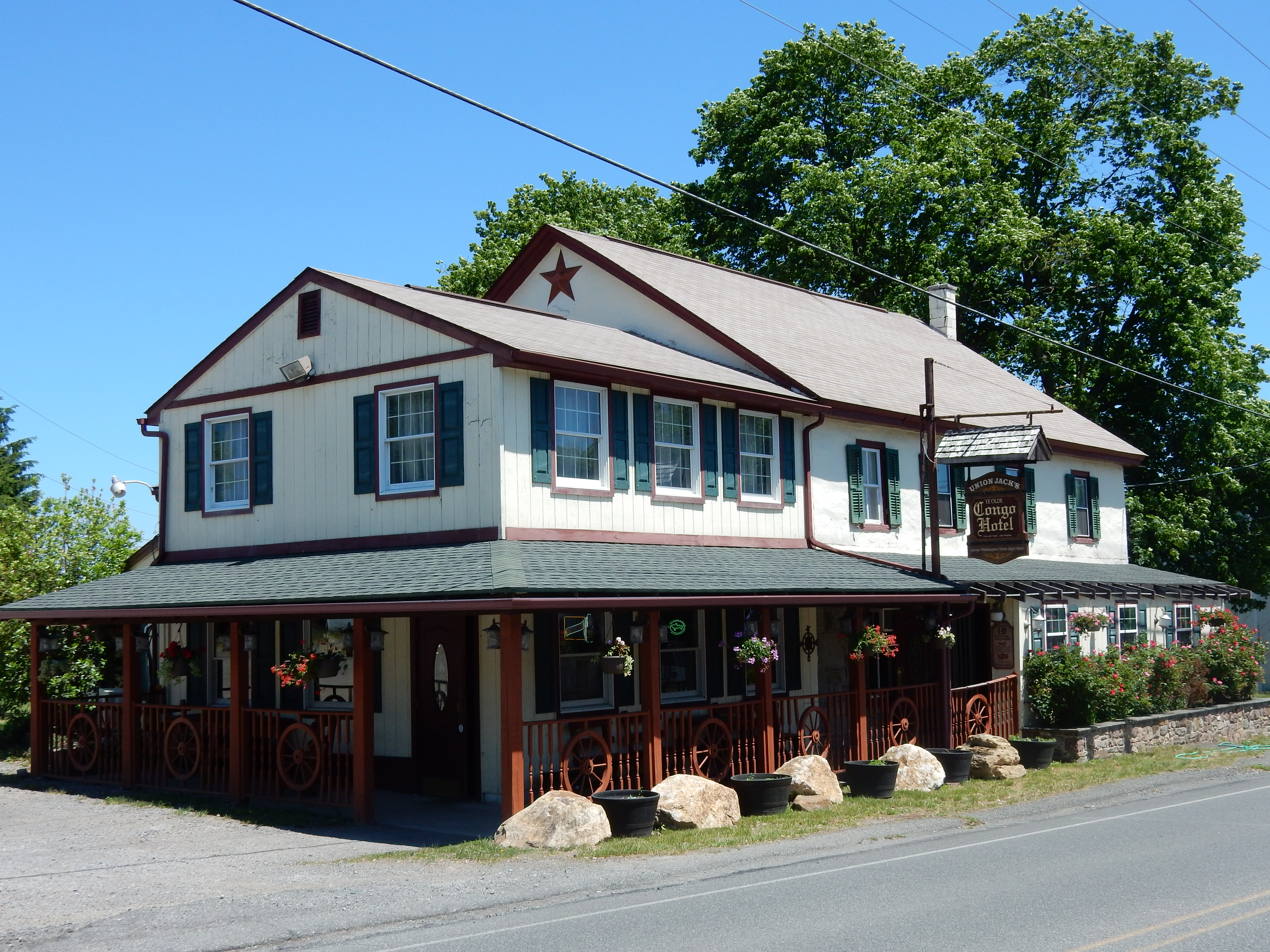
- Union Jack's Olde Congo Hotel.

- Location within Pennsylvania
- Coordinates: 40°21′03″N 75°35′02″W
- Country: United States
- State: Pennsylvania
- County: Montgomery
- Township: Douglass
- Elevation: 427 ft (130 m)
- Time zone: UTC-5 (Eastern (EST))
  - Summer (DST): UTC-4 (EDT)
- ZIP Code: 19504
- Area codes: 610 and 484
- GNIS feature ID: 1172326

Congo is a village in Douglass Township, Montgomery County, Pennsylvania, United States. Congo is located at the intersection of Hoffmansville Road and Congo Road, northeast of Boyertown. It is drained by the Swamp Creek into the Perkiomen Creek and uses the Barto ZIP Code of 19504.

== Name origin ==
The village was named Cedarville until the 1880s, when the US Post Office decided to rename it due to the existence of at least three other Pennsylvania post offices with "cedar" in their names. The Congo Basin was in the news at the time due to conflicting European claims and measures to settle them. While the Congo post office closed around 1925, the name has remained with the community ever since.
