= Henry G. Hager =

American politician (1934–2024)

Henry G. Hager III

President pro tempore of the Pennsylvania Senate
- In office January 6, 1981 – November 30, 1984
- Preceded by: Martin Murray
- Succeeded by: Robert Jubelirer

Republican Leader of the Pennsylvania Senate
- In office January 4, 1977 – November 30, 1980
- Preceded by: Richard Frame
- Succeeded by: Robert Jubelirer

Member of the Pennsylvania Senate from the 23rd district
- In office January 2, 1973 – November 30, 1984
- Preceded by: Zehnder Confair
- Succeeded by: Roger Madigan

District Attorney of Lycoming County
- In office 1964–1968
- Succeeded by: Allen E. Ertel

Personal details
- Born: April 28, 1934 Williamsport, Pennsylvania, U.S.
- Died: June 27, 2024 (aged 90) Fort Myers, Florida, U.S.
- Party: Republican
- Spouse: Sally Ann Parrish (died 2017)
- Occupation: Lawyer

Henry G. Hager III (April 28, 1934 – June 27, 2024) was an American politician from Pennsylvania who served as a Republican member of the Pennsylvania State Senate for the 23rd district from 1973 to 1984 including as President pro tempore from 1981 to 1984.

== Early life and education ==
Hager was born in Williamsport, Pennsylvania on April 28, 1934, to Dr. Henry G. and Eleanor Watt Hager. He received a B.A. degree in 1956 from Wesleyan University and graduated from the University of Pennsylvania Law School in 1959.

== Career ==
Hager served as the Lycoming County District Attorney from 1964 to 1968.

He joined the Pennsylvania State Senate for the 23rd district in November 1972 and was reelected in 1976 and 1980. He advanced in the Republican caucus to minority leader and served as President pro tempore from 1981 to 1984. He left the senate in 1984 and became president of the Insurance Federation of Pennsylvania.

== Death ==
Hager died in Fort Myers, Florida on June 27, 2024, at the age of 90.

== Legacy ==
The Hager Lifelong Education Center at Pennsylvania College of Technology was named in his honor.

== See also ==
- List of Pennsylvania state legislatures

Pennsylvania State Senate
Preceded by Zehnder Confair	Member of the Pennsylvania Senate, 23rd district 1973-1984	Succeeded by Roger A. Madigan
Preceded by Martin L. Murray	President pro tempore of the Pennsylvania Senate; 1981–1984	Succeeded by Robert Jubelirer
