= Charles H. Ealy =

American lawyer and politician in Pennsylvania

President pro tempore of the Pennsylvania Senate
- In office 1941–1944
- Preceded by: Frederick T. Gelder
- Succeeded by: M. Harvey Taylor

Member of the Pennsylvania State Senate
- In office 1927–1947
- Preceded by: George W. Derrick

Personal details
- Born: Charles Hodge Ealy; January 25, 1884 Schellsburg, Pennsylvania, U.S.
- Died: November 8, 1947 (aged 63) Somerset, Pennsylvania, U.S.
- Education: Bucknell University (BA, MA); University of Pittsburgh (LLB)
- Occupation: Lawyer, politician

Charles Hodge Ealy (January 25, 1884 – November 8, 1947) was an American lawyer and politician who served in the Pennsylvania State Senate from 1927 to 1944 and as Senate president pro tempore from 1941 through 1944. A conservative Republican, Ealy represented Pennsylvania's 36th District, which then comprised Bedford, Fulton, and Somerset counties.

== Early life and education ==
Ealy was born in the borough of Schellsburg in Bedford County, Pennsylvania, to parents Taylor Filmore Ealy, a physician, and Mary (Ramsey) Ealy. His parents worked as Presbyterian medical missionaries to the Zuni people in the Southwestern United States. Ealy attended Pittsburgh's Bedford Academy and went on to receive his BA and MA degrees from Bucknell University and his LLB from the University of Pittsburgh School of Law. He was admitted to the Somerset County bar in 1908.

== Career and conservatism ==
Ealy established a private law practice in Somerset and tried cases before state appellate courts, district courts, and the US Supreme Court. From 1916 to 1919, he served as Somerset County solicitor. Elected to the state senate in 1926, he served five consecutive terms, including four years as president pro tempore, through 1946, when he retired and returned to Somerset to resume his practice. Ealy's four-year term as president pro tempore was the longest continuous term since William Marks in 1825. He chaired the senate's judiciary, elections, appropriations, and county government committees and served on the Joint State Government Commission from 1939 to 1947, serving as the commission's vice president from 1943 to 1947. He served three years as president of the Somerset Chamber of Commerce and was a deacon of the Presbyterian Church of Somerset.

Ealy was a conservative Republican who adamantly opposed the federal government's New Deal as well as ramped-up state government spending on social welfare and public projects during the Great Depression. He led the opposition to Governor George Earle's Little New Deal. As president pro tempore during World War II, Ealy was responsible for passage of the state's defense and security laws, wartime manufacturing bills, federal compliance legislation, and veterans' job assistance bills.

== Personal life and death ==
Ealy married Edna May Pritts circa 1908; the couple had three daughters. He died from a heart attack at his Somerset home within a year of his retirement.
