= Martin L. Murray =

American politician

President pro tempore of the Pennsylvania Senate
- In office January 5, 1971 – November 30, 1980
- Preceded by: Robert Fleming
- Succeeded by: Henry Hager

Member of the Pennsylvania Senate from the 14th district
- In office January 7, 1969 – November 30, 1980
- Preceded by: William Z. Scott
- Succeeded by: Raphael Musto

Member of the Pennsylvania Senate from the 14th district
- In office January 1, 1957 – November 30, 1964

Member of the Pennsylvania House of Representatives from the Luzerne County district
- In office January 2, 1945 – November 30, 1948

Personal details
- Born: December 16, 1909 Ashley, Pennsylvania, U.S.
- Died: July 1, 1990 (aged 80) Wilkes-Barre, Pennsylvania, U.S.

Martin L. Murray (December 16, 1909 – July 1, 1990) was an American politician from Pennsylvania who served as a Democratic member of the Pennsylvania State Senate for the 14th district from 1957 to 1964 and again from 1969 to 1982. He served as President Pro Tempore of the Senate from 1971 through 1980 and is the longest serving Democratic President Pro Tempore in Pennsylvania eclipsing Presley Carr Lane's previous record of eight years. He also served in the Pennsylvania House of Representatives for the Luzerne County district from 1945 to 1946.

== Early life and education ==
Murray was born in Ashley, Pennsylvania to Martin and Bridget Finnerman Murray. He graduated from Saint Leo High School and the Wharton School of Finance. He was the owner and operator of a successful insurance agency in Wilkes-Barre, Pennsylvania.

== Career ==
He served on the Ashley, Pennsylvania school board for 24 years. He served as a member of the Pennsylvania House of Representatives from 1945 to 1956. He served as a member of the Pennsylvania State Senate for the 21st district from 1957 to 1964 and for the 14th district from 1969 to 1980.

He is interred at Saint Mary's Cemetery in Wilkes-Barre, Pennsylvania.

== See also ==
- List of Pennsylvania state legislatures
