= James A. Geltz =

American attorney and politician (1900–1963)

Member of the Pennsylvania State Senate from the 40th district
- In office January 3, 1939 – January 2, 1951
- Preceded by: William B. Rodgers
- Succeeded by: Robert D. Fleming

Personal details
- Born: James Anderson Geltz; June 30, 1900 Pittsburgh, Pennsylvania, U.S.
- Died: September 21, 1963 (aged 63) Pittsburgh, Pennsylvania, U.S.
- Party: Republican
- Spouse: Helen Wallace
- Education: Pennsylvania State College; University of Pittsburgh

James Anderson Geltz (June 30, 1900 – September 21, 1963) was an American attorney and politician who served twelve years as a member of the Pennsylvania State Senate. A Republican, he was majority leader of that body during the 1941–42 session. He was previously an unsuccessful candidate for Congress in Pennsylvania's 30th congressional district in 1936, losing to Peter J. De Muth. Geltz lost his seat after being defeated by Robert D. Fleming in the 1950 Republican primary. He was pronounced dead at Presbyterian–University of Pennsylvania Medical Center after suffering a heart attack while attending a wedding at Saint Paul Cathedral in 1963.
