= Bob Mensch =

American politician (born 1945)

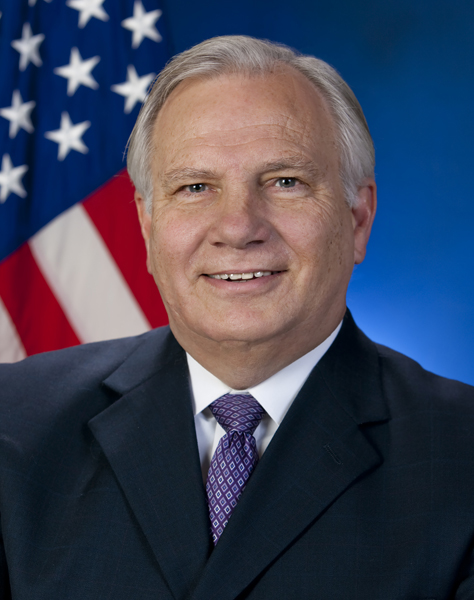

Member of the Pennsylvania Senate from the 24th district
- In office October 19, 2009 – November 30, 2022
- Preceded by: Rob Wonderling
- Succeeded by: Tracy Pennycuick

Member of the Pennsylvania House of Representatives from the 147th district
- In office January 2, 2007 – October 19, 2009
- Preceded by: Raymond Bunt Jr.
- Succeeded by: Marcy Toepel

Personal details
- Born: August 27, 1945 (age 81) Pennsburg, Pennsylvania, US
- Party: Republican
- Children: 2
- Education: Valley Forge Military Academy and College
- Occupation: Legislator
- Website: State Senator Bob Mensch

Robert Mensch (born August 27, 1945) is an American politician. A Republican, served as a member of the Pennsylvania State Senate representing the 24th district from 2009 to 2022. He previously served as a member of the Pennsylvania House of Representatives, where he represented the 147th legislative district.

== Biography ==
Mensch attended Valley Forge Military Academy and College on a music scholarship. He worked for 27 years as a general manager at AT&T and later for ARBROS Communications as a National Sales Director. He then served as a Marlborough Township Supervisor from 2004 through 2006. He is the co-founder of the Unami Watershed Conservancy and chairman of the Upper Perkiomen Valley Regional Planning Commission.

== PA State Senate ==
On July 28, 2009, State Senator Rob Wonderling retired from his seat in the 24th district in order to assume the presidency of the Greater Philadelphia Chamber of Commerce. Mensch announced his intention to seek the Republican nomination for the special election as soon as Wonderling announced his plans. With Montgomery County Commissioner and former District Attorney Bruce Castor and former State Representative Jay Moyer withdrawing their names, Mensch had a clear path to the nomination that he received on August 6.

On September 29, Mensch defeated Democratic Lansdale Borough Council member Anne Henning Scheuring with 66% of the vote. In the 2010 general election he defeated Democrat Bill Wallace with 60% of the vote.

Senator Mensch was elected by his Republican colleagues to serve as Majority Caucus Chairman, a leadership position, for the 2019-2020 legislative session. As chairman he presides over Republican caucus meetings to discuss bills and amendments and to develop caucus strategy. He serves as Vice Chairman of the Veterans Affairs and Emergency Preparedness Committee and sits on the influential Senate Appropriations Committee. In addition, the Senator is a member of four additional committees: Health and Human Services; Game and Fisheries; Aging and Youth; and Labor & Industry. He co-chairs the bipartisan Senate Life Science Caucus, Economy, Business and Jobs Caucus, and the Community College Caucus. He also chairs the Legislative Budget and Finance Committee, which conducts studies and makes recommendations aimed at eliminating unnecessary government spending.

Senator Mensch sponsored Senate Bill 358, now Act 86 of 2013, which requires certified FDA facilities to provide patients with information regarding their breast density.

He also sponsored Senate Bill 181, now Act 48 of 2017, which requires all departments and agencies to justify their budget requests beginning with dollar one, for all existing as well as proposed programs for each fiscal year, before they can receive consideration for budget funding.

In October 2021, Mensch announced he would retire at the conclusion of his term.
