= Zern's Farmer's Market =

Former year-round farmers' market located in Gilbertsville, Pennsylvania

Coordinates: 40.3222°N 75.6181°W

Zern's Farmers Market was a year-round farmers' market located in Gilbertsville, Pennsylvania. The official website for the market spells both "Zern's" and "Farmer's" both with and without an apostrophe. It was located along Philadelphia Avenue (Pennsylvania Route 73) near Bartman Avenue, close to Pennsylvania Route 100. Two buildings are located on the property: a lowercase "t"-shaped main building and an L-shaped (and smaller) enclosed flea market building. When weather permitted, outdoor vending areas were set up in the space between the edifices in an area known affectionately as "the Midway". The "main" building was heated during winter, and utilized a fan-circulation and heat extraction system during the warmer months of the year.

The market sold a variety of items, including toys, collectibles, pets, clothing, electronics, produce, and prepared food -- much of which includes noticeable Pennsylvania Dutch influences. The facility also housed two full-service butcher shops, a delicatessen, a barber shop, two bakeries, a specialty spice shop, a Hershey's Ice Cream hand-dipped ice cream shop, and a fresh poultry vendor. It was a common gathering location for residents in the area. Auntie Anne's Pretzels was the market's sole chain vendor.

Weekly live auctions were held in the main building, and an ongoing "silent auction" could be found in the flea market building. Other specialty events included automobile shows and local wrestling federation matches. The market was normally open on Fridays and Saturdays only, although holiday hours varied.

== History ==
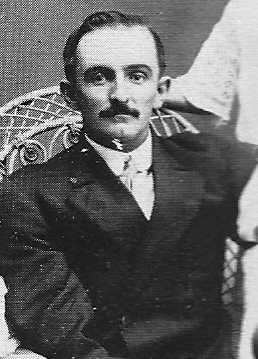
William K. Zern, c. 1910

William Zern (1883 - 1978) started Zern's, also known as "The Sale," in 1922. The small family farm auction was soon joined by neighbors and townsfolk and before long a Gilbertsville landmark was born. During the early days, livestock was auctioned in the large lower barn. The auction grew and pulled in numerous vendors of widely varying merchandise. In 1966, tragedy struck as fire broke out and turned Zern's into a pile of burnt remains. Within days there was a groundbreaking for the new building.

Philadelphia magazine once voted Zern's "Best Of Philly."

When the economic downturn began in December of 2007, stands at Zern's became increasingly vacant. The effects of the economy were compounded by the fact that two new shopping centers, both featuring grocery stores and restaurants opened within 2 miles (in either direction, on Route 100) of the market.

In June 2018, it was announced that Zern's Farmer's Market would cease operations after 96 years of operation. Zern's ended operations on September 30, 2018.
