= Drew Lewis =

American businessman and politician (1931–2016)

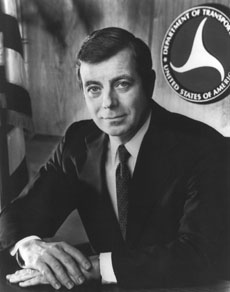

7th United States Secretary of Transportation
- In office January 23, 1981 – February 1, 1983
- President: Ronald Reagan
- Preceded by: Neil Goldschmidt
- Succeeded by: Elizabeth Dole

Personal details
- Born: Andrew Lindsay Lewis Jr. November 3, 1931 Broomall, Pennsylvania, U.S.
- Died: February 10, 2016 (aged 84) Prescott, Arizona, U.S.
- Party: Republican
- Spouse: Marilyn Stoughton
- Children: 4
- Education: Haverford College (BA); Harvard University (MBA); Massachusetts Institute of Technology

Andrew Lindsay Lewis Jr. (November 3, 1931 – February 10, 2016), generally known as Drew Lewis, was an American businessman and politician from the state of Pennsylvania. He was U.S. Secretary of Transportation in the first portion of the administration of U.S. President Ronald Reagan, and is best known for presiding over the firing of the striking U.S. air traffic controllers in 1981.

== Life and education ==
Andrew Lindsay Lewis Jr. was born in Norristown, Pennsylvania, on November 3, 1931, and grew up in Broomall. He received his Bachelor of Science in 1953 from Haverford College in Haverford, Pennsylvania, and in 1955 his Master of Business Administration from Harvard University. He did postgraduate work at MIT in 1968. In June 1950, he married the former Marilyn Stoughton, a Republican former member of the Pennsylvania House of Representatives. The Lewises had four children together and fourteen grandchildren; son Andrew L. Lewis, III, died in infancy.

His son Andrew "Andy" Lewis, IV, served as a township commissioner in Haverford Township between 2004 and 2007 and was elected in 2007 to the Delaware County Council. Lewis's sister, Floy Lewis Bakes, graduated from Ursinus College; he donated $3 million to Ursinus to build a field house, which became the Floy Lewis Bakes Center. At the time of his nomination for Transportation Secretary, he was a member of the Schwenkfelder Church. Lewis died of complications from pneumonia in Prescott, Arizona on February 10, 2016, at the age of 84.

== Career ==
In the 1950s he held several positions at Henkels and McCoy, Inc. In the 1960s he rose up the ranks of National Gypsum Company, becoming their assistant chairman in 1969. From 1972 to 1974 he was president and chief executive officer (CEO) of Snelling and Snelling, Inc. In 1971, he was appointed as trustee in bankruptcy (along with Richardson Dilworth) for the Reading Company, the railroad company headquartered in Philadelphia, and guided the company through its successful reorganization and discharge from bankruptcy in 1980.

From 1974 to 1981 he headed Lewis and Associates, a business consulting firm. He became involved in politics through a friend, Richard S. Schweiker, for whom he managed successful campaigns for the U.S. House of Representatives and U.S. Senate. During the 1960s and 1970s, he served in several political capacities: county committee member, chairman of the Pennsylvania Republican Party's finance committee, Republican candidate for governor in 1974, chairman of the Pennsylvania delegation to the 1976 Republican National Convention in Kansas City, Missouri, and the deputy chairman of the Republican National Committee. The Philadelphia Inquirer described him as "among the two or three most powerful Republicans in Pennsylvania and one of the most powerful in the Northeast."

During the 1976 Republican presidential campaign, Lewis, as head of the powerful Pennsylvania delegation, had backed Gerald Ford, over challenger Ronald Reagan. At the Republican convention, Reagan announced that if nominated he would name Richard Schweiker, Lewis' friend, as his running mate. Lewis had already committed to Ford and so honored his word, and kept his delegation in line to help nominate Ford as the Republican candidate. Reagan remembered his loyalty in 1980, and appointed Lewis to head his Pennsylvania campaign organization.

In 1980, Lewis served as Reagan's Pennsylvania campaign chairman. When Reagan was elected President, he named Lewis as his Secretary of Transportation, where he served from 1981 to 1983. The 1981 air traffic controllers strike occurred during his tenure. When the strikers defied Reagan's threat to fire them if they did not return to work, it was Lewis who announced their controversial en masse dismissal. Another milestone was the enactment of the Surface Transportation Assistance Act of 1982, which included a gasoline tax increase and user fees to pay for improvements. By the time he left Washington, The Washington Post reported that Lewis was "generally regarded here as the most able domestic Cabinet officer in the administration."

== Later life ==
In 1983, Lewis was hired as chairman and CEO of Warner-Amex Cable Communications (WACCI), the joint venture between the then Warner Communications and American Express, succeeding Gustave M. Hauser. In this role, he was also chairman of the WACCI subsidiary, Warner-Amex Satellite Entertainment Company (WASEC), which eventually became known as MTV Networks after a public offering in 1984. In April 1986, about the time Warner Communications sold its interest in MTV Networks, and purchased American Express's share of Warner Amex Cable (renaming it Warner Cable), Drew Lewis left WACCI to become chairman and CEO of the Union Pacific Corporation and its subsidiary, the Union Pacific Railroad.

In 1986, Lewis appeared at the commencement exercises of his alma mater, Haverford College, to be awarded an honorary doctorate degree. After learning that a significant portion of the faculty of the Quaker college had opposed awarding him the honor because of his actions during the still-controversial air traffic controllers strike, he declined to accept the degree. He said he did so out of respect for the Quaker tradition of making decisions by consensus.

In October 1986, he became president and CEO of Union Pacific Corporation, parent of the railroad. One year later, on October 1, 1987, he became chairman and CEO of Union Pacific Corporation, succeeding William S. Cook. He served in that post until 1997. In February 1987, President Reagan asked Lewis to return to the White House and accept the appointment of White House Chief of Staff, following the resignation of Donald T. Regan. However, Lewis refused the President's request, and the job was subsequently filled by Howard Baker. In later years, Lewis sat on the boards of American Express, Ford Motor Company, Gannett Company, and SmithKline Beecham.

== See also ==
- List of Harvard University politicians

Party political offices
Preceded by Ray Broderick	Republican nominee for Governor of Pennsylvania; 1974	Succeeded by Dick Thornburgh
Political offices
Preceded by Neil Goldschmidt	United States Secretary of Transportation; 1981–1983	Succeeded by Elizabeth Dole
Business positions
Preceded by John Kenefick	President of Union Pacific Corporation; 1986–1987	Succeeded by Mike Walsh
Preceded by John Kenefick	CEO of Union Pacific Corporation; 1986–1997	Succeeded by Richard Davidson
