= Douglass Township, Montgomery County, Pennsylvania =

Township in Pennsylvania, US

Douglass Township
- Township
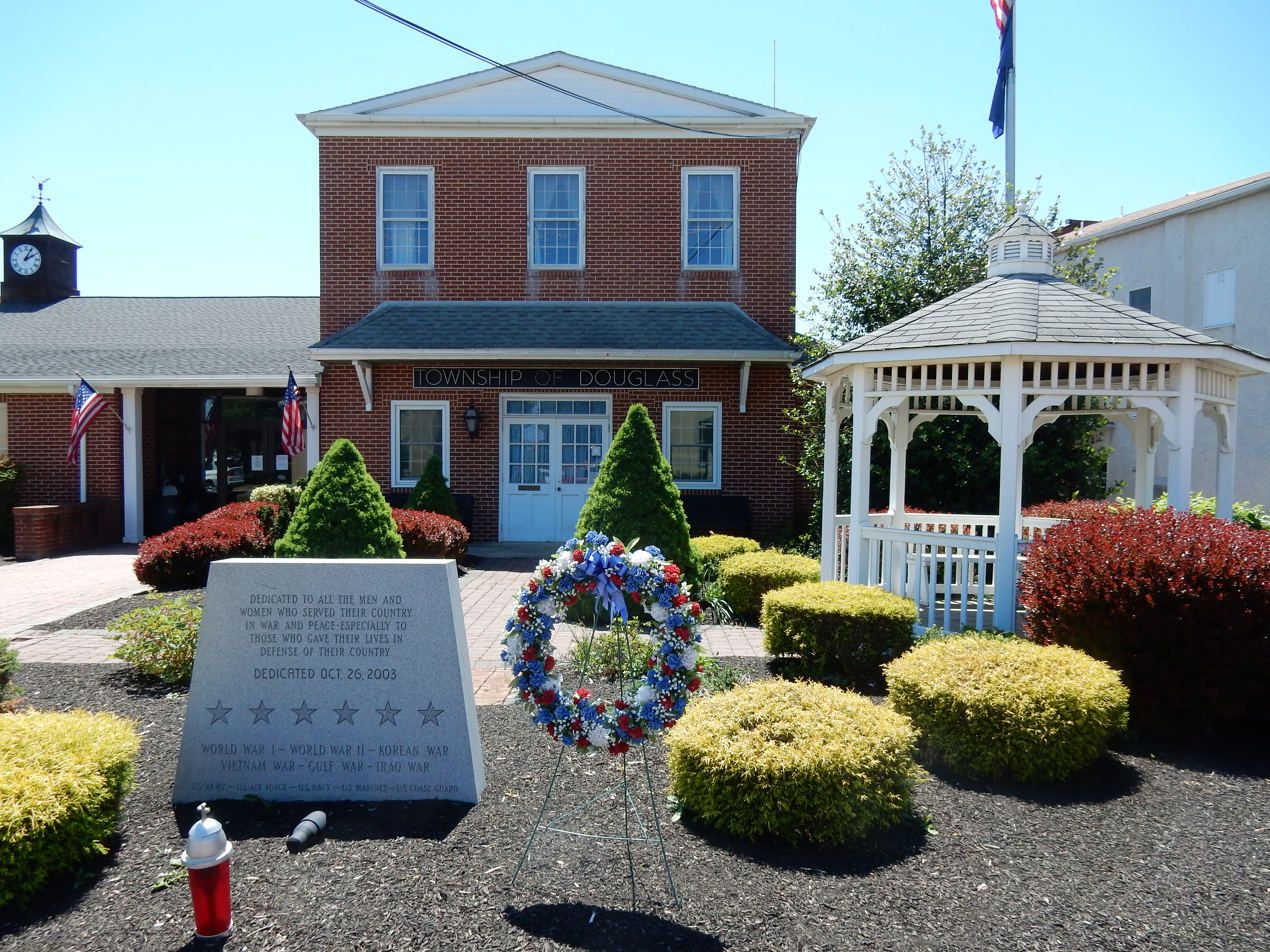
- The Douglass Township Building and War Memorial in Gilbertsville

- Coat of arms

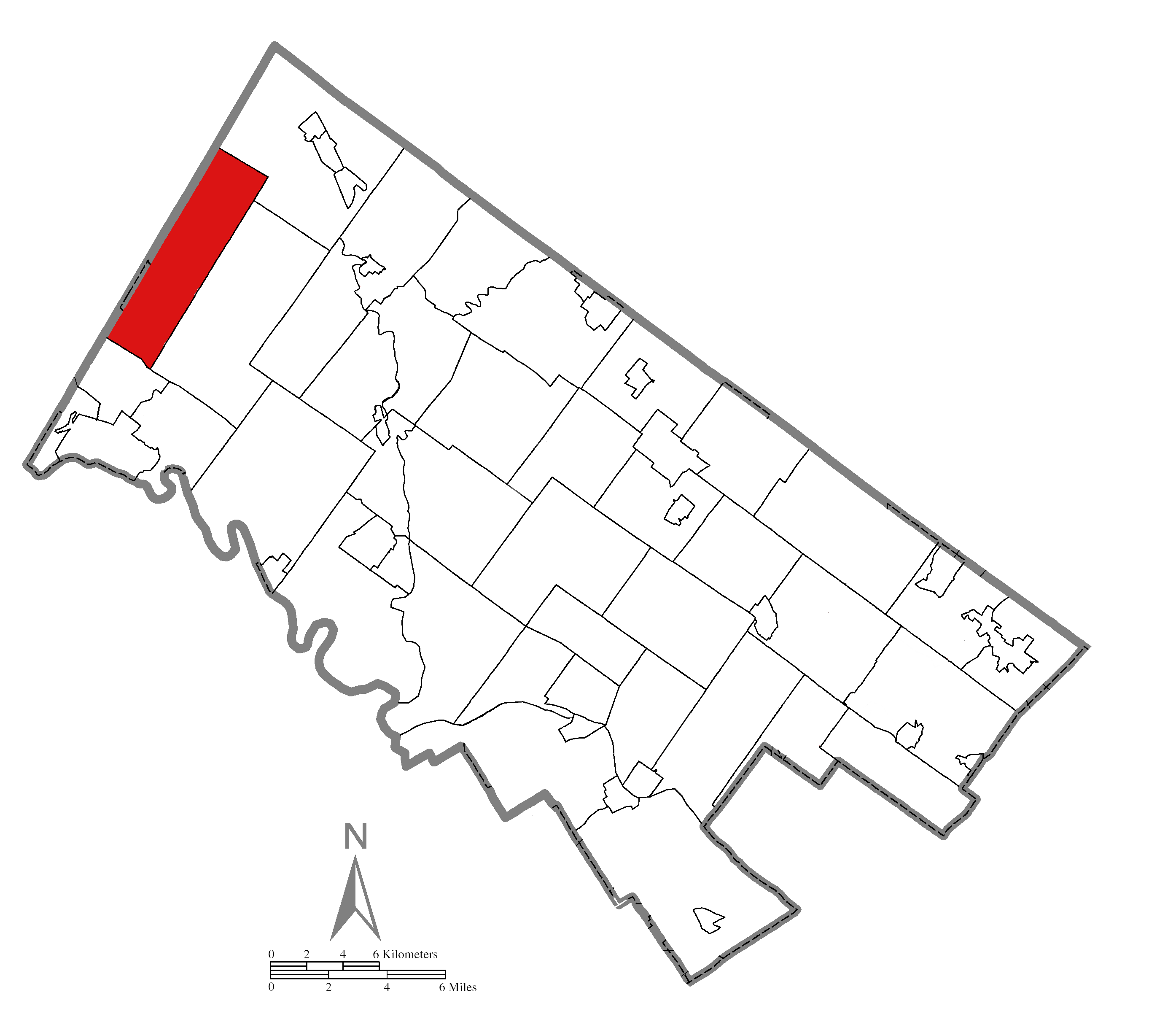
- Location of Douglass Township in Montgomery County, Pennsylvania

- Location of Pennsylvania in the United States
- Coordinates: 40°22′36″N 75°34′29″W
- Country: United States
- State: Pennsylvania
- County: Montgomery
- Established: 1741

Area
  - Total: 15.29 sq mi (39.59 km^{2})
  - Land: 15.28 sq mi (39.58 km^{2})
  - Water: 0.0039 sq mi (0.01 km^{2})
- Elevation: 459 ft (140 m)

Population (2020)
  - Total: 10,585
  - Density: 692.6/sq mi (267.43/km^{2})
- Time zone: UTC-5 (EST)
  - Summer (DST): UTC-4 (EDT)
- ZIP Codes: 18084, 19472, 19504, 19505, 19512, 19525
- Area code: 610
- Website: www.douglasstownship.org

Douglass Township is a rural township in Montgomery County, Pennsylvania, United States. The population was 10,585 at the 2020 census. Douglass Township is a largely rural community, with only about 30% of its land area developed with residential and commercial uses. Almost 45% of the township’s land area is dedicated to agricultural use, and another 22% is wooded or open fields. This rural character is a source of great community pride and identifies the township to residents and visitors. Douglass Township is located at the northwestern border of Montgomery County, Pennsylvania, and is a largely rural municipality totaling 15.8 square miles. Gilbertsville is a 3.4 square-mile Census Designated Place (CDP) which contains the majority of Douglass’ developed land area and serves as the township’s center of commerce and government. Gilbertsville is adjacent to Boyertown Borough in Berks County, and both towns share a common main street, Philadelphia Avenue.

== Geography ==
According to the United States Census Bureau, the township has a total area of 15.3 square miles (40 km^{2}), all land. It is drained by the Schuylkill River via the Perkiomen Creek. The township's villages include Congo, Englesville (also in Berks County,) Gilbertsville, Niantic, and Sassamansville (also in New Hanover Township.)

The township has a hot-summer humid continental climate (Dfa) and is in hardiness zones 6b and 7a. The average monthly temperatures in Gilbertsville range from 30.2 °F in January to 74.9 °F in July. The average annual absolute minimum temperature in Gilbertsville is -0.5 °F. The average monthly temperatures in Niantic range from 29.5 °F in January to 74.3 °F in July.

=== Neighboring municipalities ===
- Upper Hanover Township (northeast)
- New Hanover Township (southeast)
- Upper Pottsgrove Township (south)
- Douglass Township, Berks County (southwest)
- Colebrookdale Township, Berks County (west)
- Washington Township, Berks County (northwest)

== Transportation ==
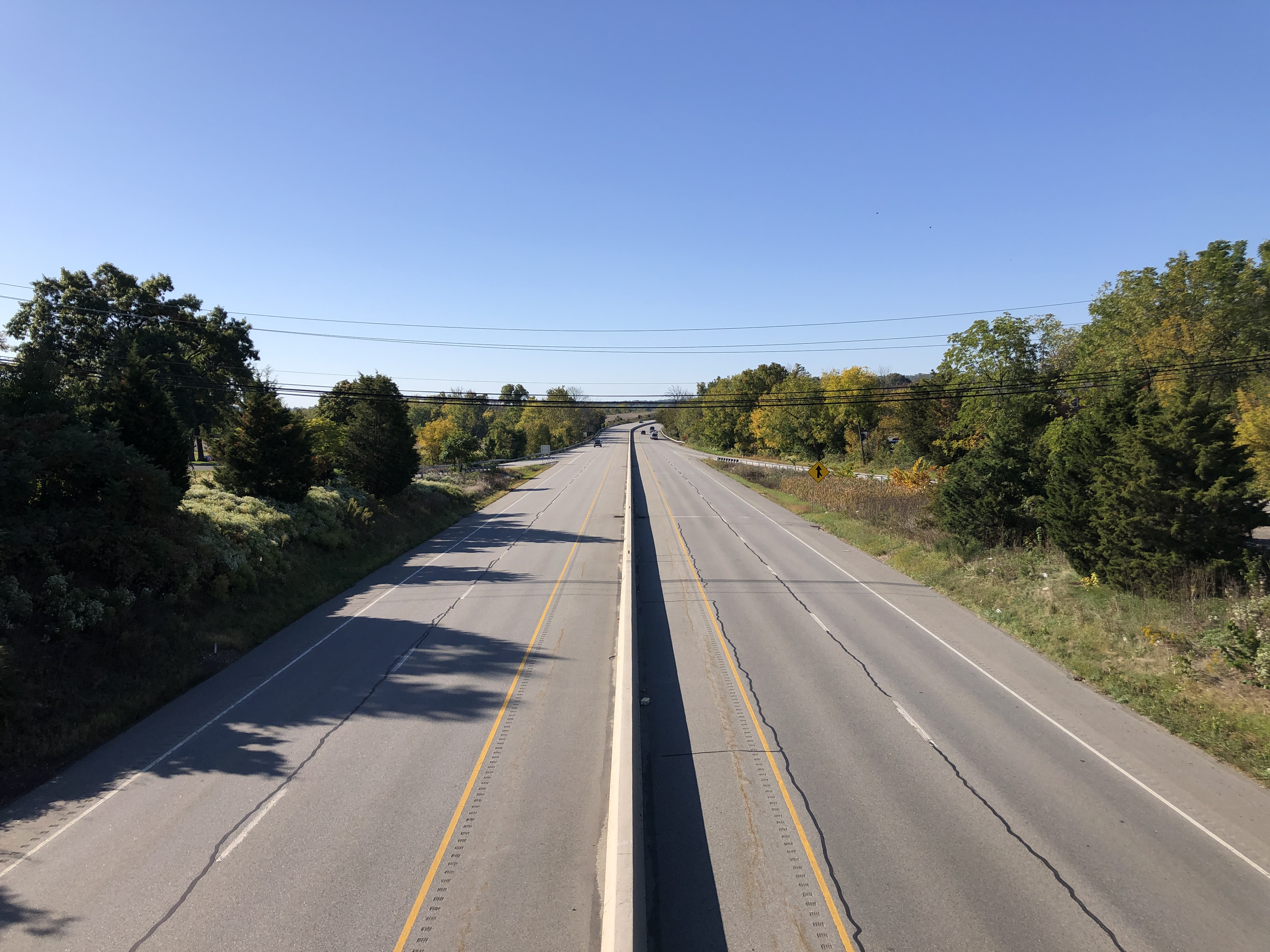
PA Route 100 southbound at PA Route 73 in Douglass Township

As of 2020 there were 79.77 miles (128.38 km) of public roads in Douglass Township, of which 6.69 miles (10.77 km) were maintained by the Pennsylvania Department of Transportation (PennDOT) and 73.08 miles (117.61 km) were maintained by the township.

The principal routes in Douglass Township are Route 73 east-to-west and Route 100 north-to-south. These meet at an interchange in Gilbertsville and other major local roads include Congo Road, Congo-Niantic Road, County Line Road, Gilbertsville Road, Hoffmansville Road, Niantic Road, and Swamp Pike. Pottstown Area Rapid Transit (PART) provides bus service to the Gilbertsville section of the township along the Orange Line route, which heads south to Pottstown.

== Demographics ==
Historical population
Census	Pop.	Note	%±
1930	1,705		—
1940	1,913		12.2%
1950	2,046		7.0%
1960	3,083		50.7%
1970	4,177		35.5%
1980	5,833		39.6%
1990	7,048		20.8%
2000	9,104		29.2%
2010	10,195		12.0%
2020	10,585		3.8%

As of the 2010 census, the township was 96.0% White, 1.0% Black or African American, 0.3% Native American, 1.1% Asian, and 1.2% were two or more races. 1.8% of the population were of Hispanic or Latino ancestry.

As of the census of 2000, there were 9,104 people, 3,211 households, and 2,552 families residing in the township. The population density was 593.4 inhabitants per square mile (229.1/km^{2}). There were 3,292 housing units at an average density of 214.6 per square mile (82.9/km^{2}). The racial makeup of the township was 97.77% White, 0.77% African American, 0.08% Native American, 0.71% Asian, 0.02% Pacific Islander, 0.14% from other races, and 0.51% from two or more races. Hispanic or Latino of any race were 0.47% of the population.

There were 3,211 households, out of which 41.8% had children under the age of 18 living with them, 66.6% were married couples living together, 9.0% had a female householder with no husband present, and 20.5% were non-families. 16.9% of all households were made up of individuals, and 7.4% had someone living alone who was 65 years of age or older. The average household size was 2.83 and the average family size was 3.20.

In the township the population was spread out, with 29.3% under the age of 18, 6.3% from 18 to 24, 31.0% from 25 to 44, 22.8% from 45 to 64, and 10.7% who were 65 years of age or older. The median age was 37 years. For every 100 females, there were 97.8 males. For every 100 females age 18 and over, there were 91.9 males.

The median income for a household in the township was $55,679, and the median income for a family was $62,404. Males had a median income of $45,728 versus $25,461 for females. The per capita income for the township was $22,476. About 2.7% of families and 2.8% of the population were below the poverty line, including 2.4% of those under age 18 and 4.9% of those age 65 or over.

== Government and politics ==
Presidential elections results
Year	Republican	Democratic
2020	60.3% 3,680	38.1% 2,323
2016	61.9% 3,170	32.9% 1,683
2012	59.9% 2,762	38.5% 1,772
2008	52.0% 2,485	47.2% 2,258
2004	59.1% 2,655	40.2% 1,808
2000	57.6% 1,835	39.1% 1,244
1996	49.1% 1,307	36.2% 964
1992	43.8% 1,106	30.2% 763

=== Legislators ===
- State Representative Donna Scheuren, Republican, 147th district
- State Senator Tracy Pennycuick, Republican, 24th district
- US Representative Madeleine Dean, Democrat, 4th district

=== Board of Supervisors ===
- Joshua Stouch, Chairman
- Don Bergstresser, Vice Chairman
- Sara Carpenter, Supervisor

== Gallery ==
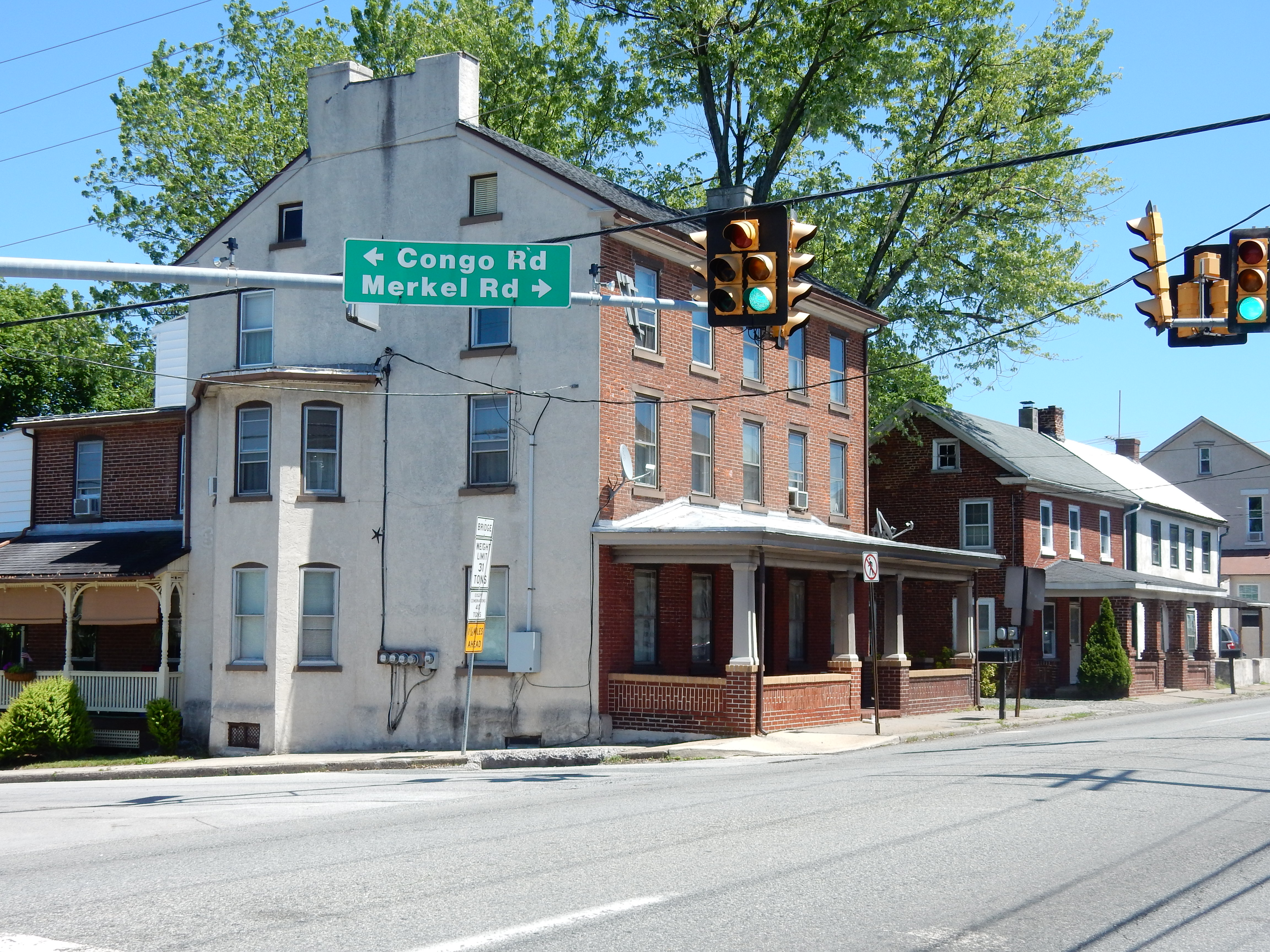
Gilbertsville, East Philadelphia Ave.

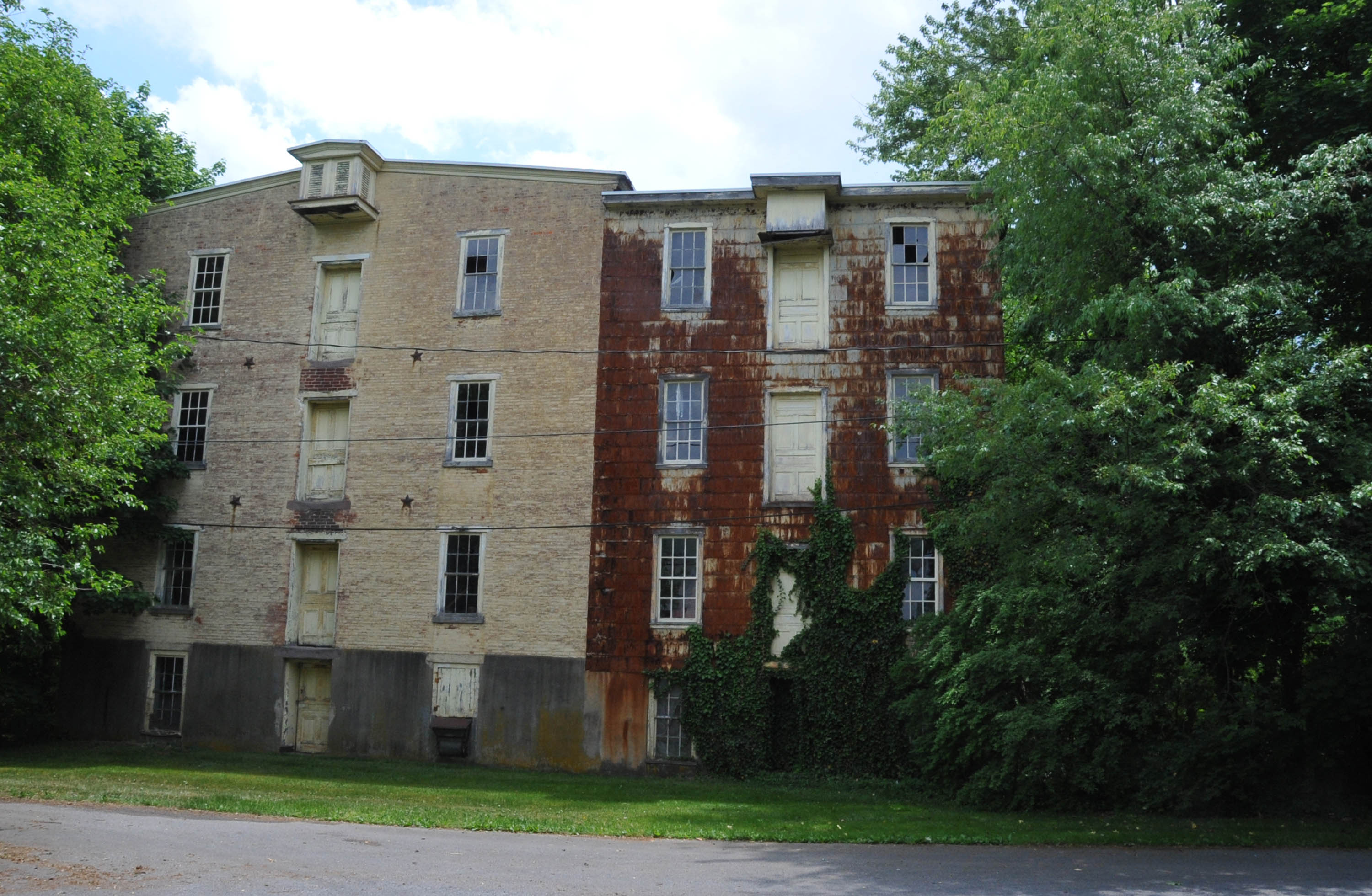
Schultz's Niantic Mill

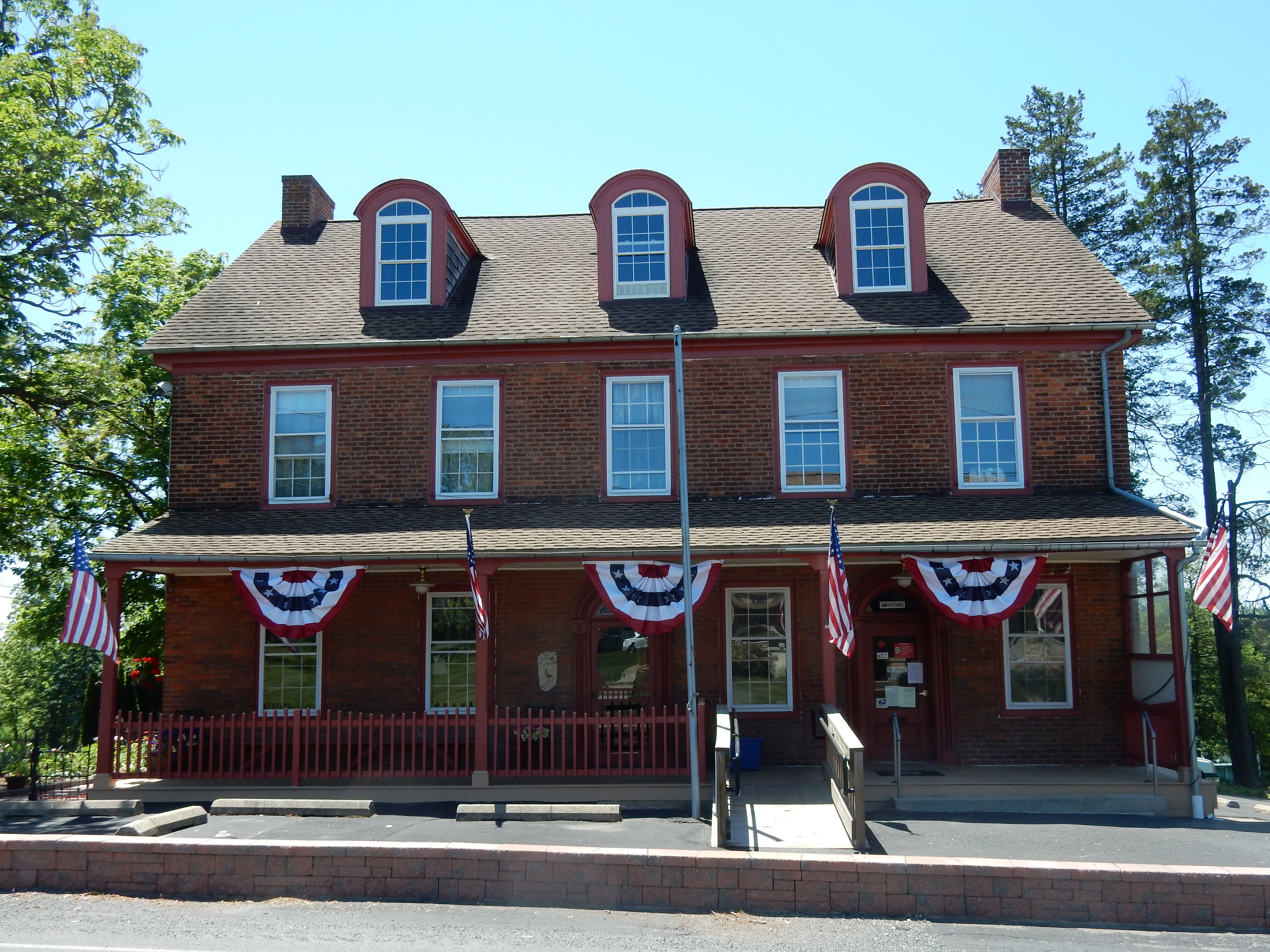
Post Office in Sassamansville

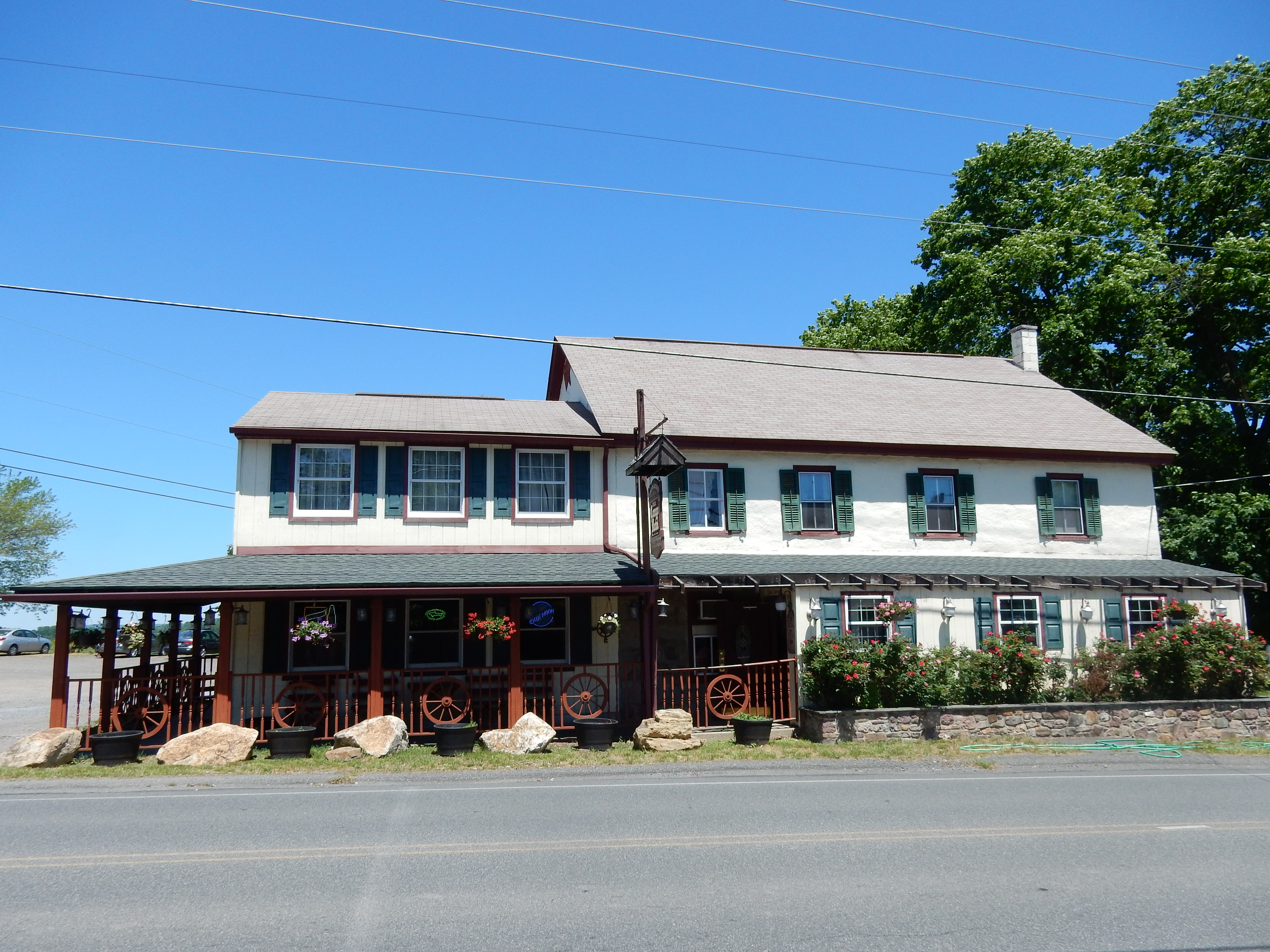
Congo, Union Jack's Olde Congo Hotel

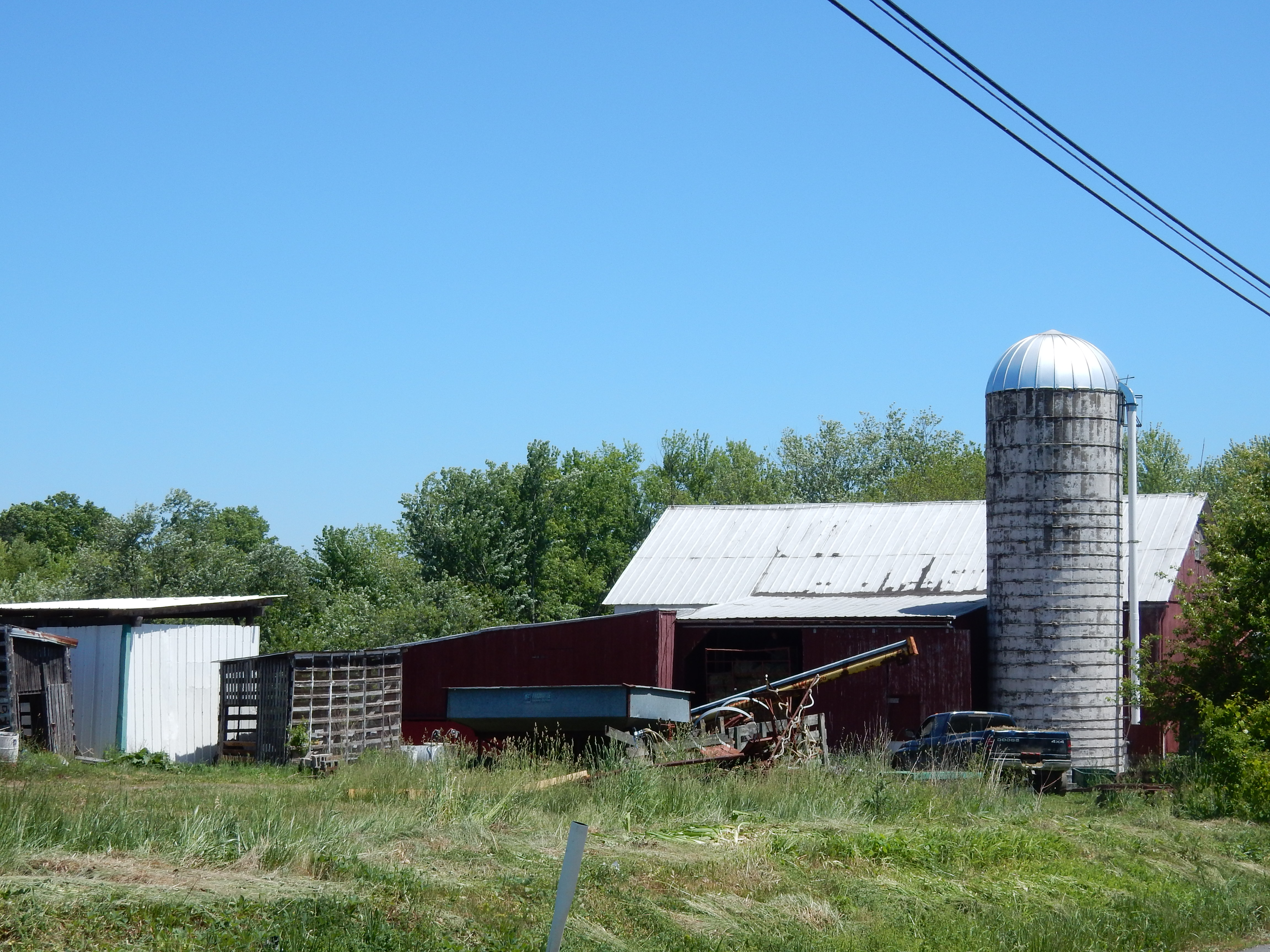
Farm near Congo
