= Tracy Pennycuick =

American politician

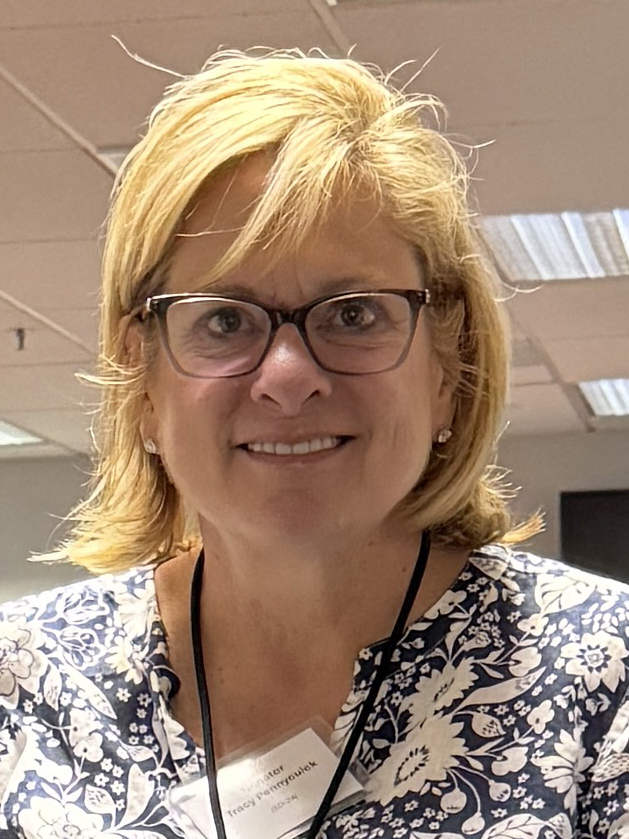
- Pennycuick in 2026

Member of the Pennsylvania Senate from the 24th district
- Incumbent
- Assumed office January 3, 2023
- Preceded by: Bob Mensch
- Succeeded by: Christopher Thomas (elect)

Member of the Pennsylvania House of Representatives from the 147th district
- In office January 5, 2021 – November 30, 2022
- Preceded by: Marcy Toepel
- Succeeded by: Donna Scheuren

Personal details
- Born: Massachusetts
- Party: Republican
- Education: University of Missouri; Post University
- Website: Official website

Tracy Pennycuick (/pˈɛnɪkˌʊk/ PEN-ee-KOOK) is an American politician. A Republican, she is a member of the Pennsylvania State Senate representing the 24th district since 2023.

Born near Boston, Massachusetts, Pennycuick previously served as a member of the Pennsylvania House of Representatives representing the 147th district from 2021 to 2022.

== Early life and education ==
Born near Boston, Massachusetts, Pennycuick graduated from Mansfield High School in Mansfield, Massachusetts in 1983. and received a bachelor's degree in business from the University of Missouri in Columbia, Missouri in 1987.

== Career ==
In 2007, Pennycuick founded an aviation consulting business.

She received a MPA in public administration from Post University in 2015.

In 2020, Pennycuick was elected to the Pennsylvania House of Representatives representing the 147th district. She defeated Democratic candidate Jill Dennin and Libertarian candidate Jared Martin with 54.7% of the vote in the general election.

In 2021, State Senator Bob Mensch announced his intention to retire at the end of his term in 2022. Pennycuick was elected to succeed Mensch in 2022. She lost her re-election bid in 2026.

== Political positions ==
State Senator Greg Rothman and Pennycuick cosponsored a bill that encouraged data center development and artificial intelligence in Pennsylvania. She later amended it to remove provisions that limited the ability to impose stricter rules on data centers.

Political offices
Pennsylvania State Senate
Preceded by Bob Mensch	Member of the Pennsylvania Senate from the 24th district 2023-Present	Incumbent
Pennsylvania House of Representatives
Preceded by Marcy Toepel	Member of the Pennsylvania House of Representatives from the 147th district 2021-2022	Succeeded by Donna Scheuren
