= Graterford =

Graterford may refer to:

- Graterford, Pennsylvania
- State Correctional Institution – Graterford
