= Eastern State Penitentiary =

Historic American prison

- The exterior of the Eastern State Penitentiary.
- Interactive map of Eastern State Penitentiary
- Location: 2027 Fairmount Avenue Philadelphia, Pennsylvania; 39°58′06″N 75°10′21″W
- Status: Closed (now a museum)
- Population: ~400 prisoners (from 1829 to 1877)
- Opened: 1829
- Closed: 1971
- Warden: Samuel R. Wood (1829–40); Robert McKenty (1908–1923)
- Website: easternstate.org
- Eastern State Penitentiary
- U.S. National Register of Historic Places
- U.S. National Historic Landmark
- Philadelphia Register of Historic Places
- Pennsylvania State Historical Marker
- Location within Philadelphia Location within Pennsylvania Location within the United States
- Area: 11 acres (45,000 m^{2})
- Built: 1829
- Architect: John Haviland
- Architectural style: Gothic Revival
- NRHP reference No.: 66000680

Significant dates
- Added to NRHP: October 15, 1966
- Designated NHL: June 23, 1965
- Designated PHMC: May 2, 1996

The Eastern State Penitentiary (ESP) is a former American prison in Philadelphia, Pennsylvania. It is located in the Fairmount section of the city, and was operational from 1829 until 1971.

The penitentiary refined the revolutionary system of separate incarceration, first pioneered at the Walnut Street Jail, which emphasized principles of reform rather than punishment.

Notorious criminals such as Al Capone and bank robber Willie Sutton were held inside its innovative wagon wheel design.

For their role in the Kelayres massacre of 1934, James Bruno (Big Joe) and several male relatives were incarcerated here between 1936 and 1948, before they were paroled.

At its completion, the building was the largest and most expensive public structure ever erected in the United States, and quickly became a model for more than 300 prisons worldwide.

The prison is currently a U.S. National Historic Landmark, which offers self-guided audio tours, guide-led tours, and other visitor programs.

== History ==
=== 19th century ===
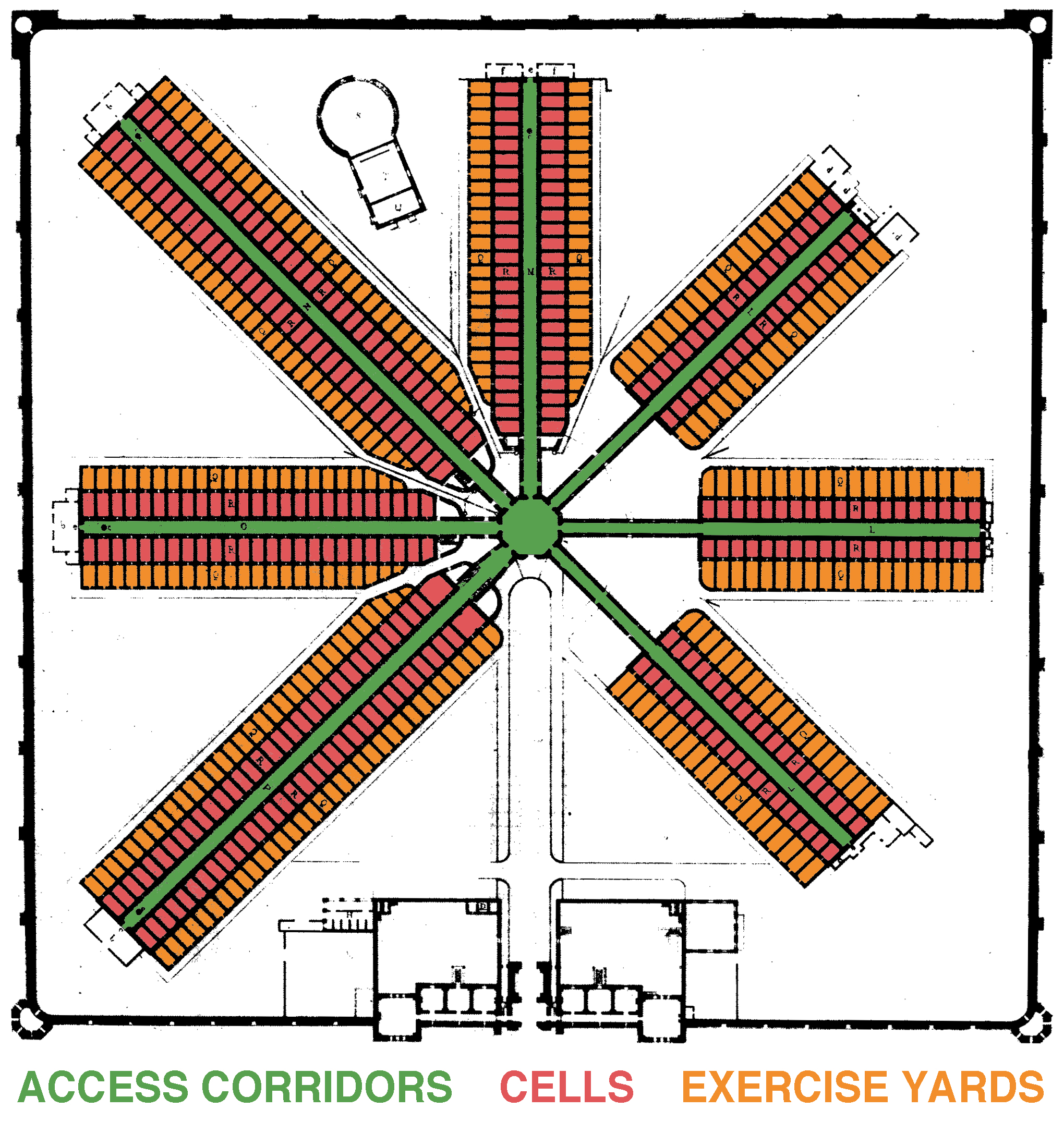
Annotated floor plan of Eastern State Penitentiary in 1836

Eastern State Penitentiary was built on an eleven-acre property locally known as Cherry Hill, which the Commonwealth of Pennsylvania purchased in 1821. Construction of the penitentiary began in 1822.

Designed by John Haviland and opened on October 25, 1829, Eastern State is considered to be the world's first true penitentiary, with seven corridors of heated and sky-lighted cells capable of holding 500 convicts in isolation.

Eastern State's revolutionary system of incarceration, dubbed the "Pennsylvania system" or separate system, encouraged separate confinement as a form of rehabilitation. The warden was legally required to visit every inmate every day, and the overseers were mandated to see each inmate three times a day.

Women were incarcerated at the prison beginning in 1831. By 1836, the female population had grown to 19, and the women were housed in the upper gallery of cellblock 7.

The Pennsylvania system was opposed contemporaneously by the Auburn system (also known as the New York system), which held that prisoners should be forced to work together in silence, and could be subjected to physical punishment (Sing Sing prison was an example of the Auburn system). Although the Auburn system was favored in the United States, Eastern State's radial floor plan and system of solitary confinement was the model for over 300 prisons worldwide.

Critic and activist John Neal in 1841 expressed revulsion at the international reputation of "a nation that broke away from all its bands and fetters, only fifty or sixty years ago — overthrowing prisons, palaces, and thrones in her march toward universal emancipation, already renowned throughout the whole earth, for her prisons, her manacles, and her badges of servitude."

In 1854, Eastern State hired its first full-time school teacher.

By 1870, Eastern State housed 671 prisoners despite having only 560 cells, which contributed to the gradual breakdown of the separate confinement system.

In 1877, four additional cell blocks were constructed in between the original cellblocks but did not contain the individual exercise yards.

Originally, inmates were housed in cells that could be accessed only by entering through a small exercise yard attached to the back of the prison; only a small portal, just large enough to pass meals, opened onto the cell blocks. This design proved impractical, and in the middle of construction, cells were constructed that allowed prisoners to enter and leave the cell blocks through metal doors that were covered by a heavy wooden door to filter out noise. The halls were designed to have the feel of a church.

Some believe that the doors were small so prisoners would have a harder time getting out, minimizing an attack on an officer. Others have explained the small doors forced the prisoners to bow while entering their cell. This design is related to penance and ties to the religious inspiration of the prison. The cells were made of concrete with a single glass skylight, representing the "Eye of God", suggesting to the prisoners that God was always watching them.

Outside the cell was an individual area for exercise, enclosed by high walls so prisoners could not communicate. Exercise time for each prisoner was synchronized so no two prisoners next to each other would be out at the same time. Prisoners were allowed to garden and even keep pets in their exercise yards. When a prisoner left his cell, an accompanying guard would wrap a hood over his head to prevent him from being recognized by other prisoners.

Cell accommodations were advanced for their time, including a faucet with running water over a flush toilet, as well as curved pipes along part of one wall, which served as central heating during the winter months and through which hot water would be run through the pipes to keep the cells reasonably heated. The cast-iron toilets were flushed with water once a day.

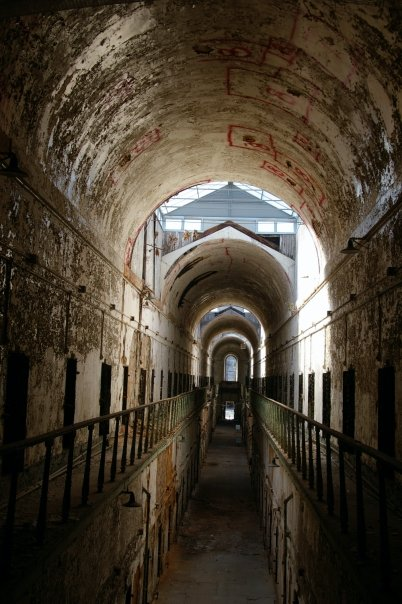
One of the two-story cell blocks in Eastern State Penitentiary

The original design called for seven one-story cellblocks radiating from a central hub. After Cellblock 3 was completed, Cellblocks 4 through 7 were constructed with two stories to accommodate the growing prison population.

As overcrowding continued, additional cellblocks were constructed between the original blocks. Cellblock 14 was built using inmate labor and was three stories high. Cellblock 15 was designed for some of the prison’s most violent offenders and included a separate safety corridor for guards.

Eastern State originally operated under the Pennsylvania system in which prisoners were kept in individual confinement and performed labor in their cells. The system was intended to encourage prisoners to reflect on their actions, become penitent and ultimately reform.

=== 20th century ===
In 1923, Leo Callahan and five other prisoners escaped after overpowering guards and scaling the prison’s east wall. His accomplices were eventually recaptured but Callahan was never found.

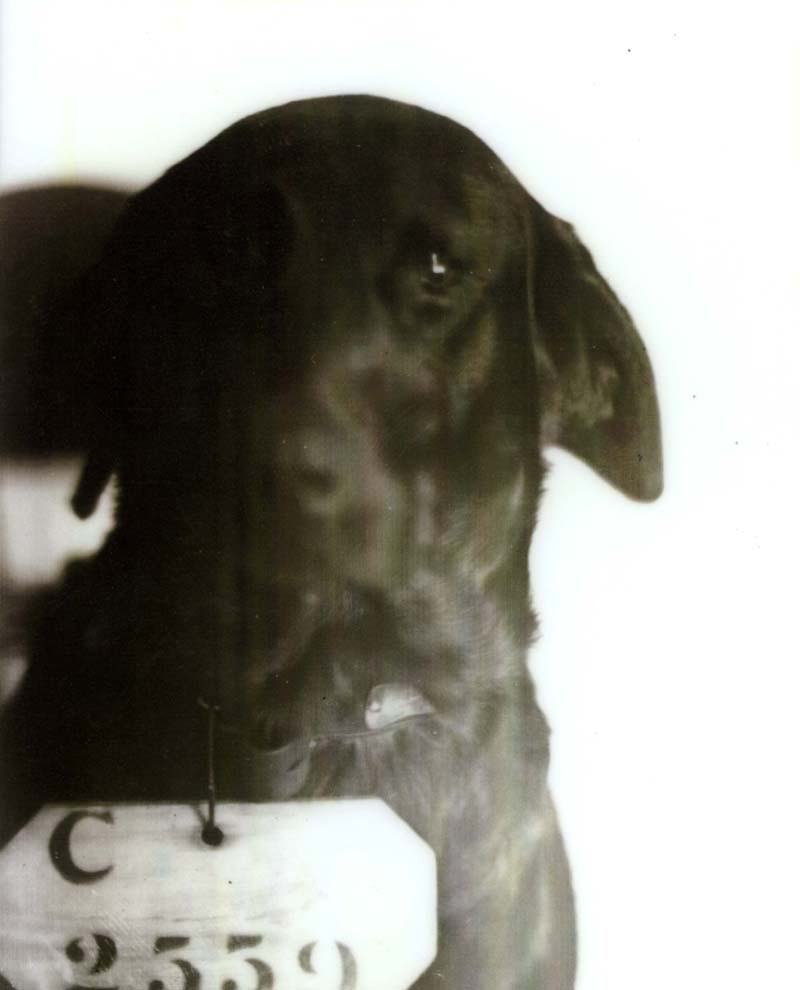
Mugshot of Pep, inmate C-2559. Falsely accused of the murder of a cat, he was pardoned in 1929.

In 1924, Pennsylvania Governor Gifford Pinchot allegedly sentenced Pep "The Cat-Murdering Dog" (an actual dog) to a life sentence at Eastern State. Pep allegedly murdered the governor's wife's cherished cat. Prison records reflect that Pep was assigned an inmate number (no. C2559), which is seen in his mug shot. However, the reason for Pep's incarceration remains a subject of some debate. A contemporary newspaper article reported that the governor donated his own dog to the prison to increase inmate morale.

The Alfred W. Fleisher Synagogue was dedicated in the prison on April 21, 1929. Fleisher had served as president of the Board until his death in 1928. The dedication service was led by Congregation Mikveh Israel's Reverend Leon Elmaleh.

On April 3, 1945, a major escape was carried out by twelve inmates (including the infamous Willie Sutton), who over the course of a year managed to dig an undiscovered 97-foot (30 m) tunnel under the prison wall. During renovations in the 1930s an additional 30 incomplete inmate-dug tunnels were discovered.

in 1953, Eastern State Penitentiary was renamed The State Correctional Institution at Philadelphia (SCI-PHA).

=== Death row ===
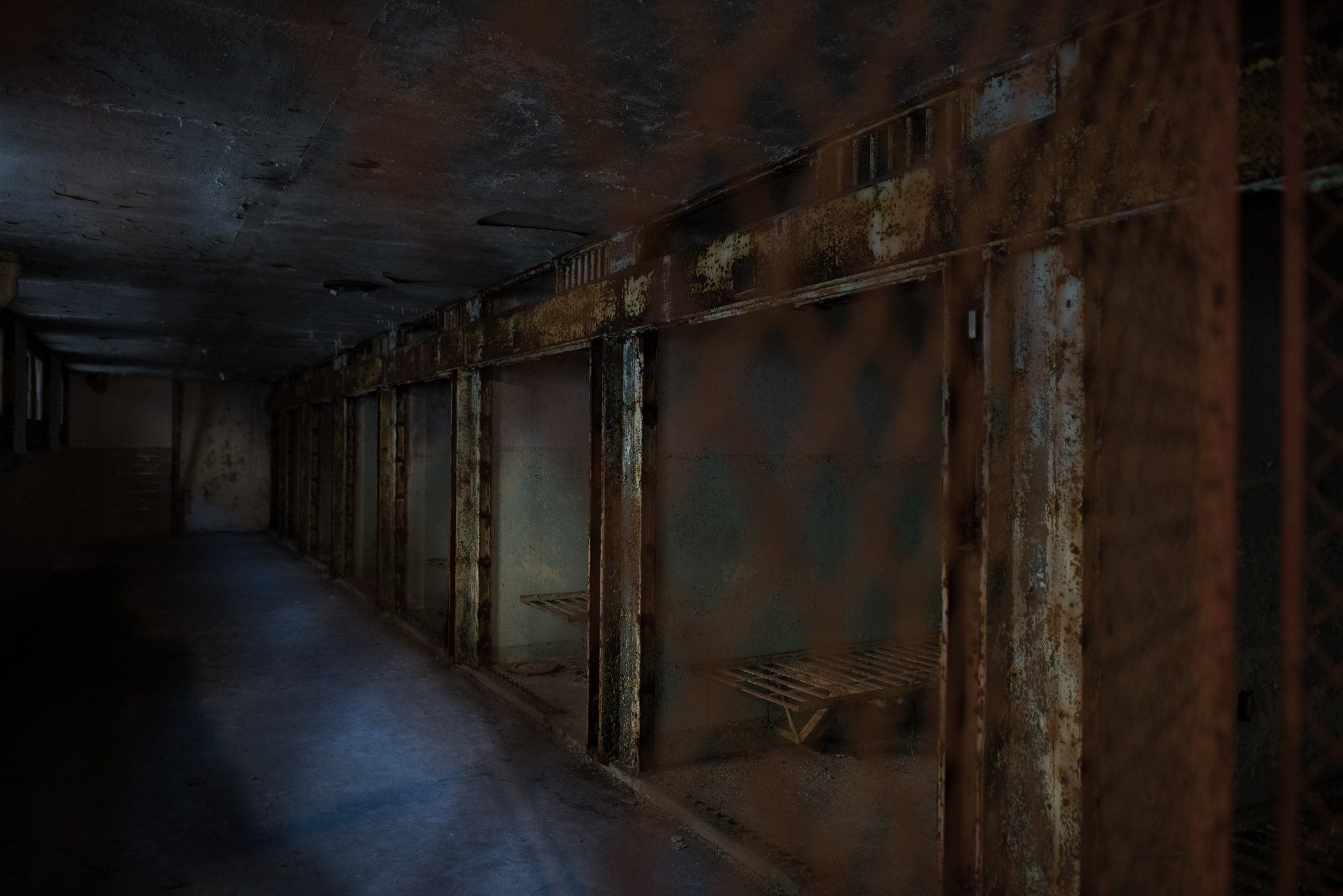
Death row cellblock

Cellblock 15, commonly known as Death Row, was constructed in 1956 and was the last major addition to Eastern State Penitentiary. It housed prisoners sentenced to death, although executions were not carried out at Eastern State.

On January 8, 1961, Eastern State experienced the largest riot in its history after inmates overpowered a guard and gained access to other cells. Police, prison guards and Pennsylvania State Police eventually gained back control of the prison.

It was designated a National Historic Landmark in 1965.

Eastern State Penitentiary closed as a state prison in 1970, with most prisoners transferred to the State Correctional Institution at Graterford.

The City of Philadelphia briefly used the penitentiary to house county prisoners until 1971 and purchased the property in 1980. During the 1980s, proposals for redevelopment included condominiums and a shopping mall.

During the abandoned era (from closing until the late 80s) a "forest" grew in the cell blocks and outside within the walls. The prison also became home to many stray cats.

In 1988, the Eastern State Penitentiary Task Force successfully petitioned Mayor Wilson Goode to halt redevelopment. In 1994, Eastern State opened to the public for history tours.

==== End of the solitary confinement system ====
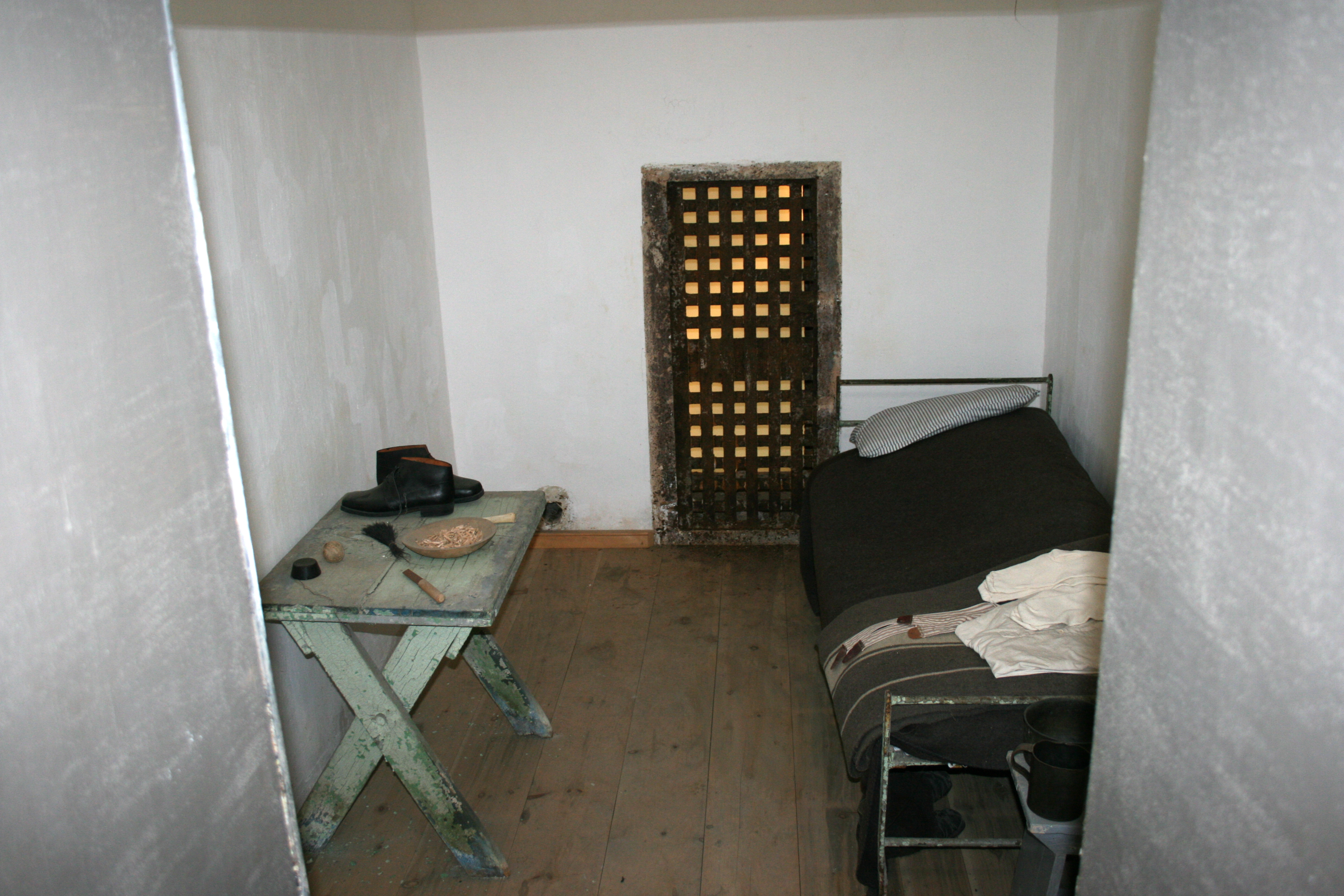
A typical cell in restored condition.

The solitary confinement system eventually collapsed due to overcrowding problems. By 1913, Eastern State officially abandoned the solitary system and operated as a congregate prison until it closed in 1970. Eastern State was briefly used to house city inmates in 1971 after a riot at Holmesburg Prison.

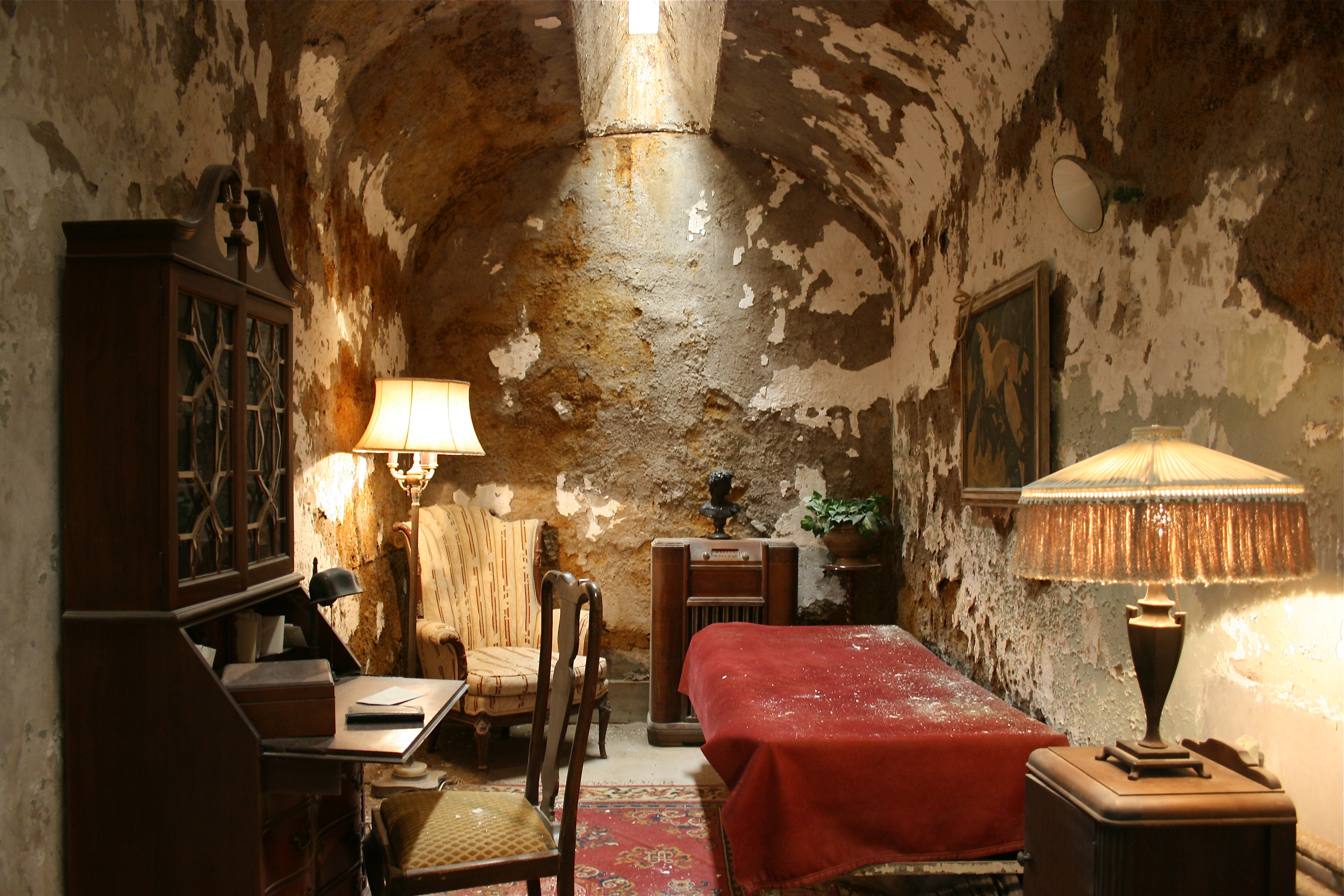
Al Capone's cell

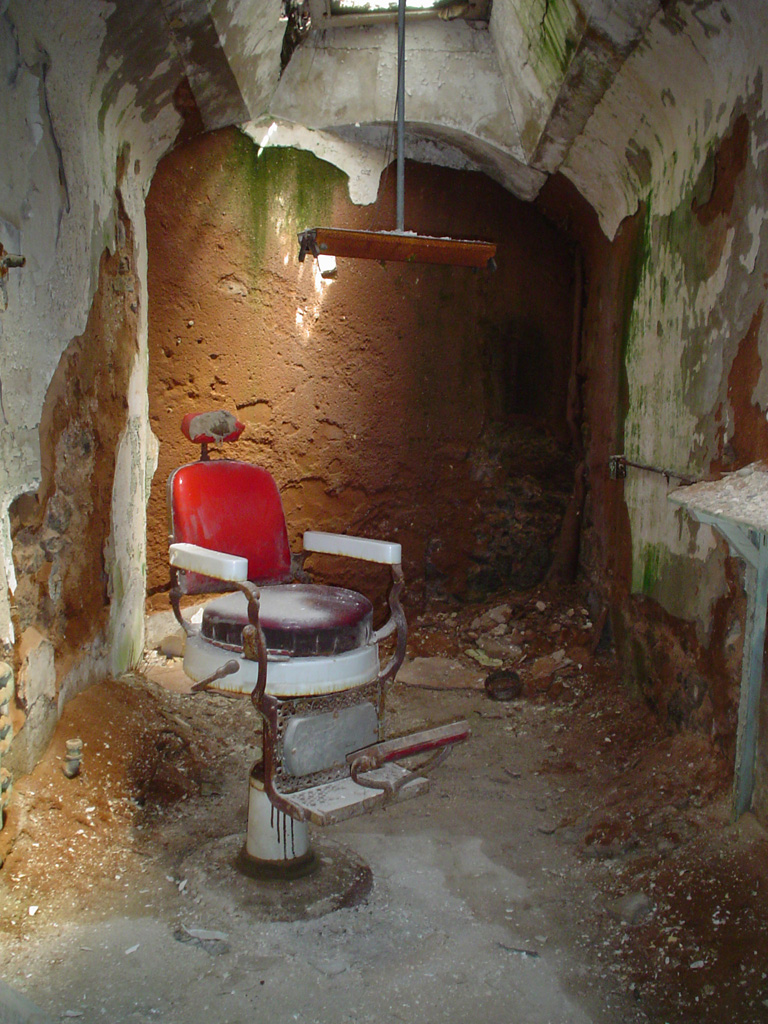
The remains of the barber shop

The prison was one of the largest public-works projects of the early republic, and was a tourist destination in the 19th century. Notable visitors included Charles Dickens and Alexis de Tocqueville, and later notable inmates included Willie Sutton and Al Capone in 1929.

Visitors spoke with prisoners in their cells, proving that inmates were not isolated, though the prisoners themselves were not allowed to have visits with family or friends during their stay.

Most of the early prisoners were petty criminals incarcerated for various robbery and theft charges (muggers, pickpockets, purse-snatchers, burglars, etc.) and the first-time offenders often served two years.

The Penitentiary was intended not simply to punish, but to move the criminal toward spiritual reflection and change. While some have argued that the Pennsylvania system was Quaker-inspired, there is little evidence to support this; the organization that promoted Eastern State's creation, the Society for Alleviating the Miseries of Public Prisons (today's Pennsylvania Prison Society) was less than half Quaker, and was led for nearly fifty years by Philadelphia's Anglican bishop, William White.

Proponents of the system believed strongly that the criminals, exposed, in silence, to thoughts of their behavior and the ugliness of their crimes, would become genuinely penitent.

In reality, the guards and councilors of the facility designed a variety of physical and psychological torture regimens for various infractions, including the use of cold showers as punishment, on at least one occasion apparently administered outside during winter, using the iron gag as punishment for talking by placing an iron piece over the prisoner’s tongue and connecting it to restraints to hold the prisoner’s hands behind their back. Prisoners could also be strapped into a restraint chair so that they could not move.

Beneath Cellblock 14 were four small punishment cells, known as “the hole” or “Klondike”. The cells had low ceilings and no plumbing, and former prisoners recalled periods of confinement lasting from 10 to 30 days.

SCI Graterford opened in 1929 after disturbances occurred at Eastern State; the Pennsylvania prison board opened Graterford to assume functions previously held by Eastern State.

In its later years, Eastern State placed increasing emphasis on group therapy. By the time the institution closed, more than 25 therapy groups were operating and correctional officers volunteered and received training to serve as co-therapists.

== Architectural significance ==
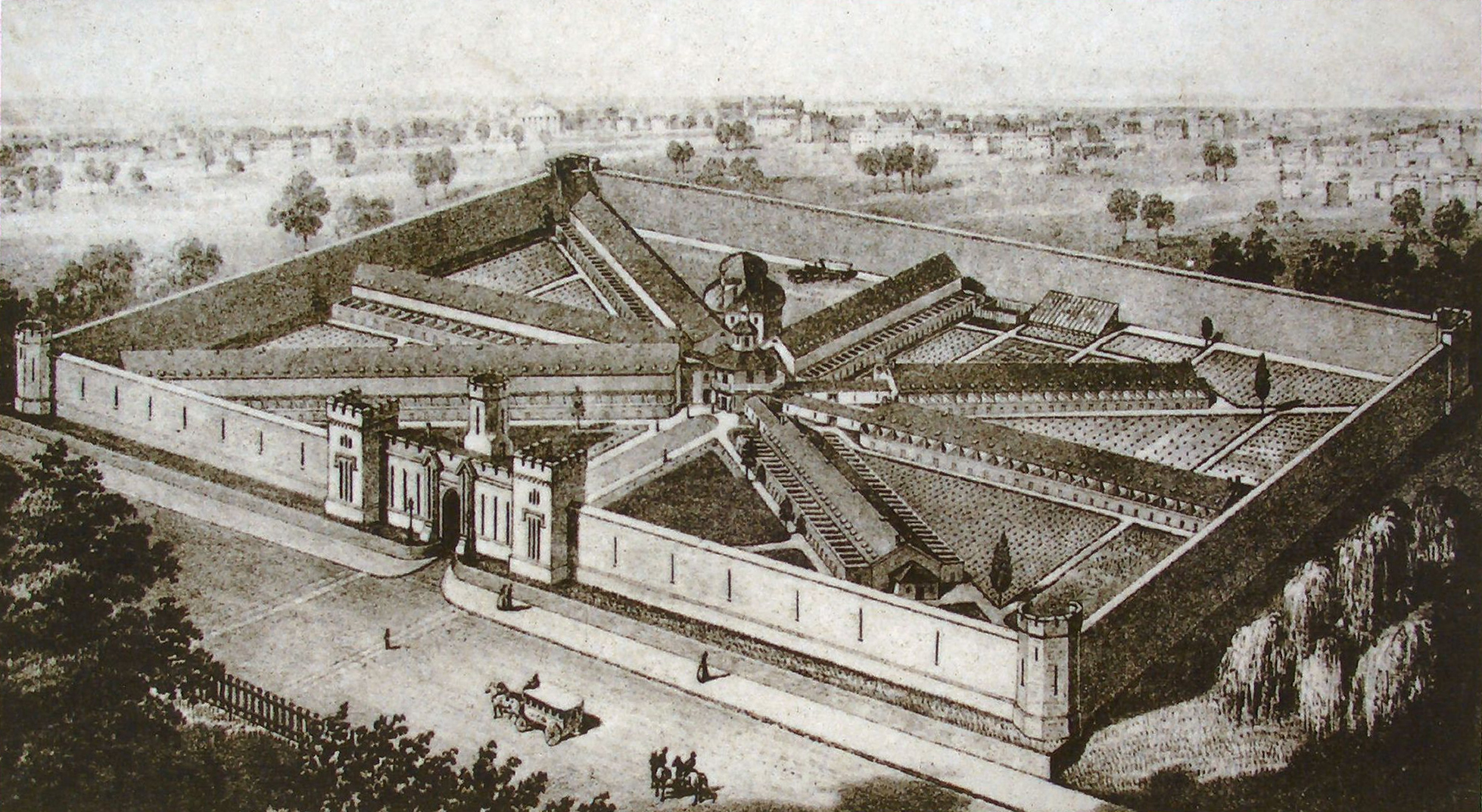
Eastern State Penitentiary's radial plan served as the model for hundreds of later prisons.

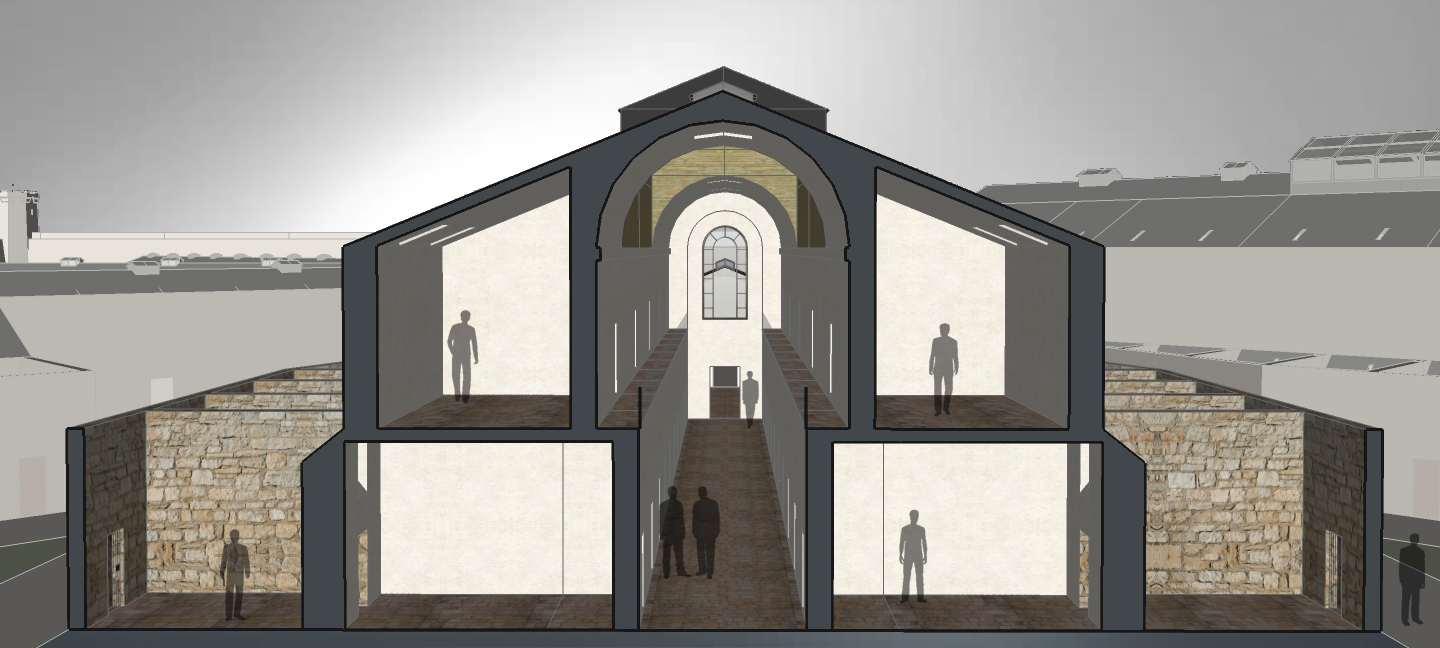
Cross Section of Cell Block

When the Eastern State Penitentiary, or Cherry Hill as it was known at the time, was erected in 1829 in Francisville (the idea of this new prison was created in a meeting held at Benjamin Franklin's house in 1787) it was the largest and most expensive public structure in the country. Its architectural significance first arose in 1821, when British architect John Haviland was chosen to design the building. Haviland found most of his inspiration for his plan for the penitentiary from prisons and asylums built beginning in the 1780s in England and Ireland. He gave the prison a neo-Gothic look to instill fear into those who thought of committing a crime.

These complexes consist of cell wings radiating in a semi or full circle array from a center tower whence the prison could be kept under constant surveillance. The design for the penitentiary that Haviland devised became known as the hub-and-spoke plan, which consisted of an octagonal center connected by corridors to seven radiating single-story cell blocks, each containing two ranges of large single cells—8 × 12 feet × 10 feet high—with hot water heating, a water tap, toilet, and individual exercise yards the same width as the cell.

There were rectangular openings in the cell wall through which food and work materials could be passed to the prisoner, as well as peepholes for guards to observe prisoners without being seen. To minimize the opportunities for communication between inmates, Haviland designed a basic flush toilet for each cell with individual pipes leading to a central sewer, which he hoped would prevent the sending of messages between adjacent cells.

The original penitentiary was completed under architect John Haviland in 1836. The cells featured skylights and were designed to keep prisoners isolated from one another. The Pennsylvania System was intended to give prisoners time in solitude to reflect on their crimes and become penitent.

Despite his efforts, prisoners were still able to communicate with each other and the flushing system had to be redesigned several times. Haviland remarked that he chose the design to promote "watching, convenience, economy, and ventilation". Once construction of the prison was completed in 1836, it could house 450 prisoners.

== Modern-day historic site ==
Eastern State Penitentiary operates as a museum and historic site. Visitors can take guide-led tours or The Voices of Eastern State audio tour, narrated by actor Steve Buscemi and featuring the voices of people who lived and worked at the penitentiary.

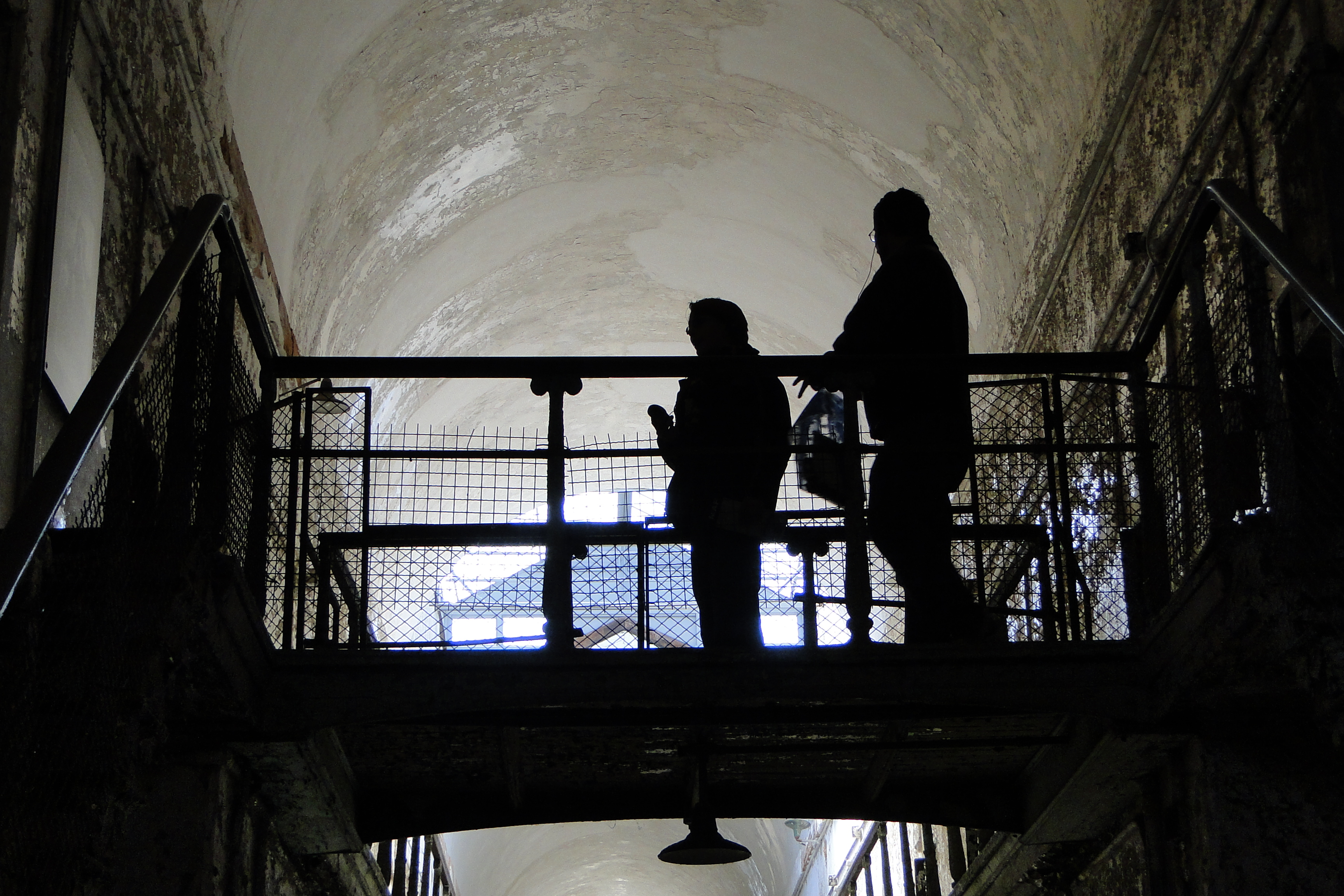

Visitors are allowed to walk into several specially marked solitary confinement cells, but most of them remain off limits and filled with original rubble and debris from years of neglect.The city skyline of Philadelphia is visible from the prison courtyard, which still has the original baseball backstop and a chain link fence atop the "outfield wall," the outer prison wall, to attempt to keep home run balls inside the grounds.

In addition, Eastern State holds many special events throughout the year. Each July, there is a Bastille Day celebration, complete with a comedic reinterpretation of the storming of the Bastille and the tossing of thousands of Tastykakes from the towers, accompanied by a cry of "let them eat Tastykake!" from an actor portraying Marie Antoinette. (This Philadelphia tradition ended in 2018.)

The museum attracts close to 220,000 visitors each year.

Religious murals in the prison chaplain's office, painted in 1955 by inmate Lester Smith, remain visible to guests despite damage from exposure to sunlight.

The tour ends with an exhibit, titled "Prisons Today: Questions in the Age of Mass Incarceration," which informs guests about the US prison system today and its failings.

=== Restoration ===
The facility was kept in "preserved ruin", meaning no significant renovation or restoration was attempted, until 1991, when The Pew Charitable Trusts provided funding so that stabilization and preservation efforts could begin.

==== Fundraising and projects ====
- Perimeter Lighting: In 2001, the Perimeter Lighting project, funded by the Department of Community and Economic Development ($250,000), and the 2000 Halloween Fundraiser ($50,000) were completed.
- Rotunda and Links Roofing: In 2002, the Rotunda and Links Roofing project, funded by Save America's Treasures Award ($500,000), the City of Philadelphia ($355,000), the Keystone Preservation ($90,000), and the 2002 Halloween Fundraiser ($55,000) was completed.
- Industrial Building Stabilization: In 2003, the Industrial Building Stabilization project, funded by the Eastern State Penitentiary Board of Directors, Senator Vincent J. Fumo, 2001 Annual Appeal, Pennsylvania Historic and Museum Commission Grant, was completed.
- The Penitentiary Hospital: In 2003, the Penitentiary Hospital roof stabilization project began, funded by the 2002 Annual Appeal, with work completed in January 2004.
- The Penitentiary Greenhouse: In 2004, The Penitentiary Greenhouse stabilization project was begun, funded by the 2004 Annual Appeal, and work was completed in April 2005.
- Alfred W. Fleisher Memorial Synagogue: In 2006, the Synagogue project began. Named after prison reformer, founder, and President of the Board of Trustees of Eastern State Penitentiary from 1924 to 1928, the Jewish Synagogue restoration was complete in 2009. Funding was spearheaded by a Synagogue Restoration Committee, headed by Cindy Wanerman, and included the Suzanne F. and Ralph J. Roberts Foundation, the Aileen K. and Brian L. Roberts Foundation, the Douglas Alfred and Diane Bayles Roberts Foundation, Howard G. and Adele F. Fleisher, the William Portner Family, as well as a long list of other individuals.

Jewish services continued at the prison until its closure in 1971. Jewish strongman Joseph Paull attended services, supplied food from his kosher butcher shop, and created a program connecting parole-eligible inmates with employers.

- Eastern State Penitentiary's Solarium Sunshine and Fresh Air Above the Hospital : In 2008, the Solarium project began, funded largely by individual donations. Built in 1922, above the hospital to combat tuberculosis, restoration was important not only architecturally but for the future of cell block 3 below.
- Eastern State Penitentiary's Kitchen and Bakery: In 2009, the kitchen and bakery roof stabilization project was begun and completed, funded largely by individual donors. The project will allow protection for several years while funding for a permanent roof can be procured.
- Operating Room In 2003 and 2004, Donors to the 2002 Annual Appeal made temporary repairs possible to the roof and drainage system of the operating room and the Recovery Room, that prevented a possible collapse of the roof. It is a significant part of the penitentiary because prior to the 1910 completion, operations were typically carried out in cellblocks.Between 2009 and 2012, the roof was rebuilt over the Solarium and Cellblock 3. Donations were collected from 183 donors for the $35,000 needed for stabilization and conservation of the Operating Room. The $54,000 collected allowed for implementation of the "Hands-On History" program.

In 1996 and 2000,the World Monuments Fund included Eastern State Penitentiary on its World Monuments Watch, its biennial list of the "Most Endangered" cultural heritage sites.

=== Haunted house attraction ===
"Halloween Nights", formerly known as "Terror Behind the Walls", is an annual Haunted House Halloween event run by the Eastern State Penitentiary Historic Site, Inc. (ESPHS). The first Halloween fundraiser took place on Halloween weekend in 1991.

The early events took various forms, including short theatrical performances and true tales of prison murder and violence.

In 1997, the event was rebranded as "Terror Behind the Walls", becoming a high startle, low gore walkthrough haunted attraction.

In 2001, it was broken up into three separate, smaller haunted attractions, including a 3-D haunted house. At the time, it was the only 3-D haunted house in Southeastern Pennsylvania and one of the first in the United States. In 2003, four semi-permanent haunted attractions were constructed inside the penitentiary complex.

The 2014 event included six attractions: Lock Down, The Machine Shop, Detritus, Infirmary, The Experiment, and Night Watch. The 2016 event also included six attractions: Lock Down: The Uprising, The Machine Shop, Break Out, Detritus, Infirmary, and Quarantine 4-D. The haunted attraction Blood Yard was added in 2017.

=== Art exhibits ===
- Ghost Cats – After Eastern State Penitentiary closed in 1971, a colony of cats took up residence on the prison grounds. Artist Linda Brenner created 39 white plaster cat sculptures to represent the colony. The sculptures were intentionally designed to deteriorate over time, reflecting the gradual decay of the penitentiary.
- The End of the Tunnel – Artist Dayton Castleman installed segments of red steel pipe throughout Eastern State’s seven original cellblocks and over the prison’s east wall. The installation was designed to suggest a continuous route escaping the confines of the prison.
- Recollection Tableaux – Susan Hagen created Recollection Tableaux, an art installation exhibited at Eastern State Penitentiary from 2008 to 2012.
- GTMO – William Cromar created GTMO, a recreation of a cell from Camp X-Ray at the Guantanamo Bay detention facility, inside a cell at Eastern State Penitentiary.
- Midway of Another Day– Michael Grothusen created Midway of Another Day, an art installation exhibited at Eastern State Penitentiary.
- I always wanted to go to Paris, France – Alexa Hoyer created I Always Wanted to Go to Paris, France, a video installation consisting of three televisions placed in a prisoner’s cell, a hallway, and a shower room. The televisions showed excerpts spanning more than seven decades of prison films. The title was taken from a quotation in one of the film excerpts shown in the prisoner’s cell.
- Juxtaposition – Brothers Matthew and Jonathan Stemler divided cell #34 in cell block 11 horizontally. A grid at the ceiling supports a display of suspended plaster pieces along a single plane. Ground mica schist poured onto the floor softens the step and enhances the texture of the space, while a bench provides a vantage point in which to view and consider the overall effect of the piece.
- My Glass House – Judith Taylor created My Glass House, a photographic art installation at Eastern State Penitentiary that incorporated images into the prison’s greenhouse.
- Living Space – Johanna Inman and Anna Norton created Living Space, a site-specific video installation at Eastern State Penitentiary.
- Purge Incomplete - Mary Jo Bole created Purge Incomplete, an installation exploring the history of plumbing at Eastern State Penitentiary. The work included replicas of the prison’s hopper-style toilets made from frosted glass and casts of its soil pipes made from polyurethane resin. The installation examined how the prison’s plumbing system was intended both to provide sanitation and to prevent communication between prisoners.

== Cultural references ==
Paranormal television programs including Ghost Hunters, Ghost Adventures, and MTV’s Fear have filmed at Eastern State Penitentiary, BuzzFeed Unsolved and MTV's Fear explored the paranormal at Eastern State.Eastern State was also used in an episode of Cold Case, titled "The House," which dealt with a murder after an inmate escape. For the show, the prison was renamed Northern State Penitentiary.

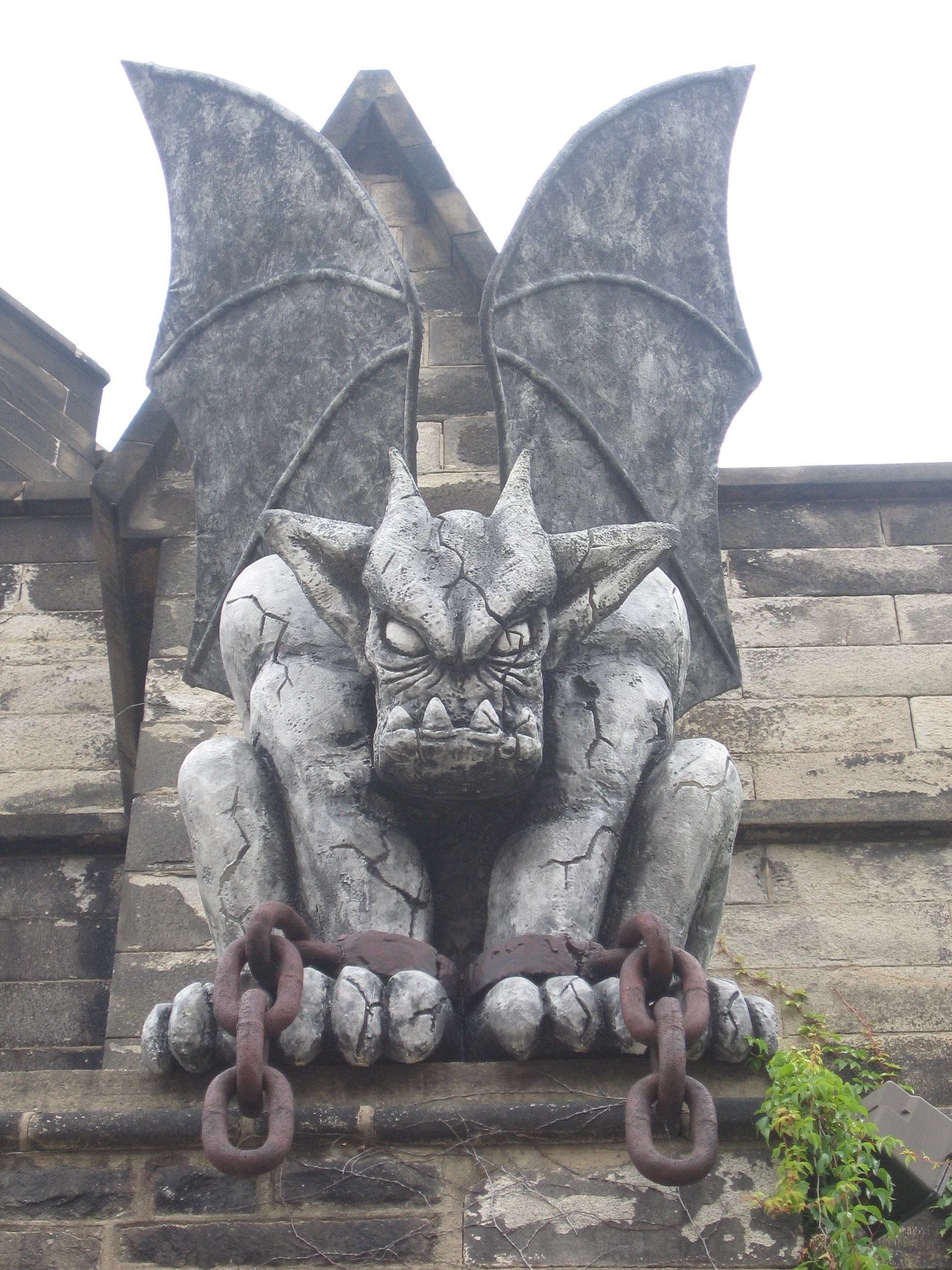

Eastern State Penitentiary was featured on Most Haunted Live in a seven-hour live paranormal investigation broadcast on June 1, 2007.

The PlayStation 2 game, The Suffering includes bonus content featuring a video tour of Eastern State Penitentiary.

On July 29, 1985, Tina Turner filmed the music video for “One of the Living” at Eastern State Penitentiary.Three years later, the Dead Milkmen filmed portions of the music video for “Punk Rock Girl” at the penitentiary.

Eastern State has also served as a location in several feature films. Terry Gilliam's 1995 film Twelve Monkeys used it as the setting for a mental hospital.The 1998 film Return to Paradise used it as a substitute for a prison in Malaysia. . In June 2008, Paramount Pictures used parts of Eastern State Penitentiary for the filming of Transformers: Revenge of the Fallen.

In September 2008, The History Press published Eastern State Penitentiary: A History by historian Paul Kahan. The book includes a foreword by Richard Fulmer.

In 2012, the soundtrack to the film Alpha Girls was recorded in Eastern State Penitentiary by the band Southwork.

== See also ==
- List of National Historic Landmarks in Philadelphia
- National Register of Historic Places listings in North Philadelphia
