= Pep (dog) =

Prison therapy dog (1920s–1930)

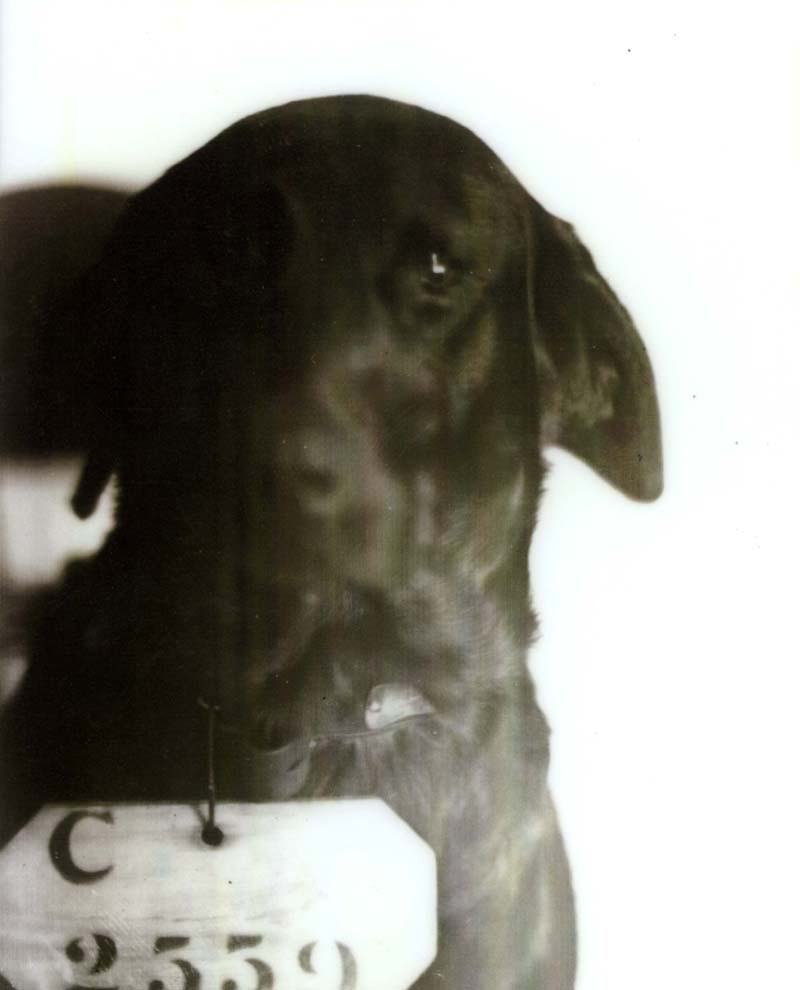
- Mugshot of Pep, 1924
- Species: Canis familiaris
- Breed: Labrador Retriever (Note: Most contemporary sources refer to Pep as a Labrador Retriever. Pinchot himself referred to the dog as a "black Scotch retriever", while newspaper articles from the 1920s and 1930s often refer to him as a black Chesapeake Bay Retriever or an Irish Setter.)
- Sex: Male
- Born: c. 1923
- Died: 1930 (aged 6–7); Graterford, Pennsylvania, US
- Occupation: Prison dog, therapy dog
- Tricks: Rat-catching
- Residence: Grey Towers
- Criminal information
- Years active: 1924–1930
- Known for: Falsely accused of murdering a cat
- Status: Pardoned (1929)
- Conviction: Murder
- Penalty: Life sentence (Note: Pep was entered into the prison ledger as having committed the crime of murder and as having a life sentence, but was actually given to the prison as a working dog.)

Details
- State: Pennsylvania
- Date apprehended: August 31, 1924
- Imprisoned at: Eastern State Penitentiary

Pep (c. 1923 – 1930) was a black Labrador Retriever who was falsely accused of murdering a cat. On August 31, 1924, Pep was sent to the Eastern State Penitentiary where he received inmate number C-2559 and had his mugshot and paw prints taken. His log into the prison ledger indicates life sentence for murder, a tongue-in-cheek gesture that prompted widespread outrage. In reality, Pep was brought to prison to boost inmate morale.

Before his incarceration, Pep was given as a gift from Maine governor Percival Baxter, who had many dogs, to Pennsylvania governor Gifford Pinchot. One of Baxter's dogs named "Governor" had successfully lived alongside inmates in a Maine prison, and Governor Pinchot was inspired to do the same with Pep. Upon Pep's incarceration, international newspapers seized upon the murder reported in Pep's police record and publicly declared him "cat murderer." Governor Pinchot and his wife Cornelia adamantly denied Pep's murder accusation, calling it a "slanderous and unjustified attack on his reputation" and a "wretched tale." The governor received hundreds to thousands of letters from as far as the Philippines protesting Pep's unfair incarceration and demanding Pep's freedom. Governor Pinchot assured the public that Pep was not a prisoner and lived a good life at the penitentiary running the grounds, chasing rats through prison corridors, and fulfilling his life's mission of becoming a friend to all. He was put on a diet in 1927 because inmates gifted him too much food. When he became old and tired, he moved to the Graterford Prison Farm, where he died in 1930.

== Early life ==
Pep was a Labrador Retriever born around 1923 and given as a gift to Pennsylvania governor Gifford Pinchot from Percival Baxter, the dog-loving governor of Maine. Pep joined the Pinchot family at Grey Towers residence in Milford, Pennsylvania, during the governor's first term. According to Pinchot, "He belonged to my son, Giff, (Note: Pinchot's son, Gifford Bryce Pinchot, was born in 1915.) and was distinguished by the fact that he was anybody's and everybody's dog." Pep was described by Pinchot in a July 1924 letter as "about a year and a half old, exceedingly friendly and good-natured, rather unusually intelligent, and very quiet", though he chewed on the cushions of the sofa that sat on the front porch.

Pinchot was inspired by Maine governor Percival Baxter, whose collie named "Governor" was successfully serving as a therapy dog at the Thomaston State Prison. Pinchot also described feeling "over-dogged" after receiving a new lot of puppies, and believed Pep would have more space to exercise at Eastern State Penitentiary. The prison, historically associated with Quaker reformists, had worsened in recent years, and the warden accepted the dog as a pet for prisoners to improve low morale.

== Imprisonment ==
Pep was taken to the penitentiary in August 1924. He was received in "due and ancient form", and on August 31 was given the inmate number C-2559, had his mugshot and paw prints taken, and was entered into the official prison ledger. His entry listed his crime as murder, his alias as "A Dog", and his sentence as life imprisonment. The prison's supervisor of rehabilitation, E. Preston Sharp, provided a transcript of Pep's formal citation in the prison ledger, "C-2559. Pep. (A dog.) Received 8-31–'24. From Pike County, Pa. All black, Chesapeake retriever. Sent by Governor Gifford Pinchot. 'To Life term for killing the governor's pet cat."

== Allegations of cat-murder ==
International newspapers picked up the story of Pep's life sentence, seizing on his status as convicted killer. He was characterized as a "cat-murdering dog" and some journalists embellished the tale with false details of a trial in which Governor Pinchot served as judge and jury, as well as untrue details about the nonexistent feline victim.

In response, Pinchot emphatically expressed that Pep had not killed any cats nor received a criminal life sentence, and instead was there so "the lot of the prisoners would be lightened". The governor received hundreds to thousands of letters and telegrams from as far as The Philippines demanding Pep not be deprived of his liberties. One letter expressed that Pep would govern better than Pinchot, saying "any day, any dog is better than any politician anyway." The governor made a statement:

Some newspaperman drawing strictly and solely on his imagination, wrote a story to the effect that the dog had been condemned to prison because he killed a cat. That wretched tale went, literally, all over the world. I got letters from every quarter of the globe, denouncing my inhuman cruelty in 'condemning the poor beast to imprisonment merely because he had followed his instincts'. These letters came largely, to judge from the handwriting, from ladies of a certain age. They kept coming, all through the rest of my term. I never saw a better illustration of the impossibility of catching up with a lie—harmless as this lie was intended to be.

For years, Cornelia Pinchot continued to condemn misconceptions about Pep's supposed bloodthirstiness, and newspapers printed headlines such as "Joke Blasted Good Name of Good Dog." In a January 1926 New York Times article she denied that Pep had ever killed a thing and stated, "I am told he is a ‘model prisoner.’ But he is not a prisoner." The Pinchots' son joined his parents in writing to newspapers to correct the misinformation about Pep being a cat-murderer.

== Life in prison ==
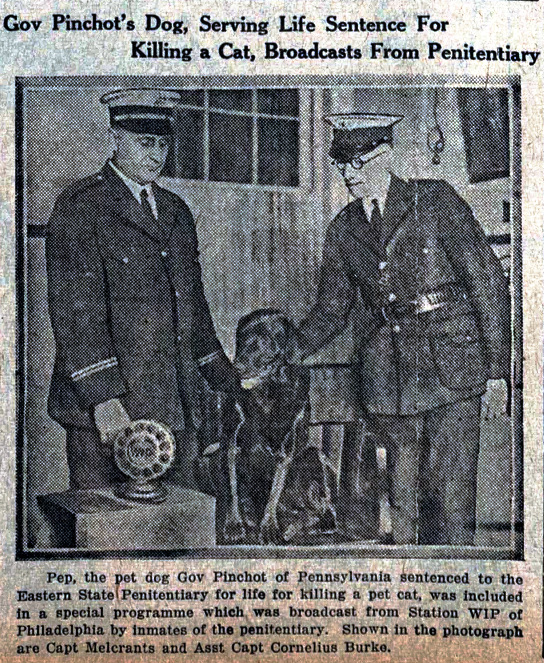
Boston Daily Globe photograph of Pep with prison guards during a 1925 radio broadcast from the penitentiary

Pep wandered the prison and the grounds freely and was well-liked by both prisoners and guards. He served as a mascot for the prison and was intended to boost the morale of the prisoners as a therapy dog. An article in the Philadelphia Inquirer opined "No despairing man brooding in his cell can feel that he is forgotten by God and man, who will feel Pep's loving tongue caressing his languid hand."

In 1925, Pep was featured in a radio program that was broadcast from the penitentiary and aired on WIP. The Boston Daily Globe published an article on December 26, 1925, with a photograph of Pep sitting in front of a radio microphone while surrounded by prison guards.

Pep accompanied guards on their nightly rounds and excelled at catching rats in the prison corridors. According to Sharp he "was quite fast for his size and weight (weight unknown, though heavy); being the equal of smaller and lighter dogs." By 1927, so many inmates were purchasing treats for Pep with their earnings that he grew "fat and lazy" and was "no longer feared by prison cats," prompting a local news story and a subsequent strict diet for Pep (who was later described as "rapidly becoming more active — much to the dismay of the aforementioned cats"). The governor visited Pep in the penitentiary "a number of times, and he was fat and healthy. But toward the end of his career he developed a partiality toward the officials of the institution and was with them more than with the prisoners."

Pep stayed at Eastern State Penitentiary until as late as 1929. (Note: According to the Eastern State Penitentiary website, Pep only stayed there two years before being sent to Graterford.) During his later time at the prison, he may have joined work crews sent to construct the Graterford Prison Farm, about 30 miles (48 km) north of Philadelphia, established in 1929. Pep's time at the penitentiary probably did not coincide with that of Al Capone, who was transferred there on August 8, 1929.

Pep grew close to J. C. Burke, a captain of the night guard. In 1929, Pep was "pardoned" and transferred to the prison farm in Graterford. A 1935 newspaper article related that Pep had grown "too fat and unwieldy and ancient for active prison service" and was "allowed to spend the rest of his days at the home of a retired guard who begged leave to care for him in his old age." Pep died in May or June 1930 and was buried in a flower bed on prison grounds. A wooden marker was placed on the grave but was later swept away in a flash flood.

The Eastern State Penitentiary, later converted to a museum, has a placard for Pep as one of the "notable inmates" and sells stuffed animals of the dog in its shop.

== See also ==
- List of individual dogs
