= Decarcerate PA =

U.S. nonprofit organization

- Abbreviation: DPA
- Formation: 2011
- Purpose: Criminal Justice, Activism, Community Organizing, Prison Reform
- Location: Pennsylvania
- Website: decarceratepa.info

Decarcerate PA is a grassroots, all-volunteer coalition that was established to challenge mass incarceration in Pennsylvania.

== Background ==
Decarcerate PA is a democratic organization which operates using a committee structure, with each committee dedicated to separate tasks. Its platform (No New Prisons, Decarceration, Community Reinvestment) has received the support of roughly one hundred other organizations.

Since 2011, the coalition has been involved challenging the construction of two new prisons outside of Philadelphia in Montgomery County, Pennsylvania, at the site of State Correctional Institution - Graterford.

In 2013, Decarcerate PA organized a 113-mile march from Philadelphia to Harrisburg, Pennsylvania, the state capital, to protest a decision by Pennsylvania Governor Tom Corbett and the Pennsylvania Legislature to increase prison funding and decrease funding in public education and social services.
