= Kuster Mill =

- U.S. National Register of Historic Places
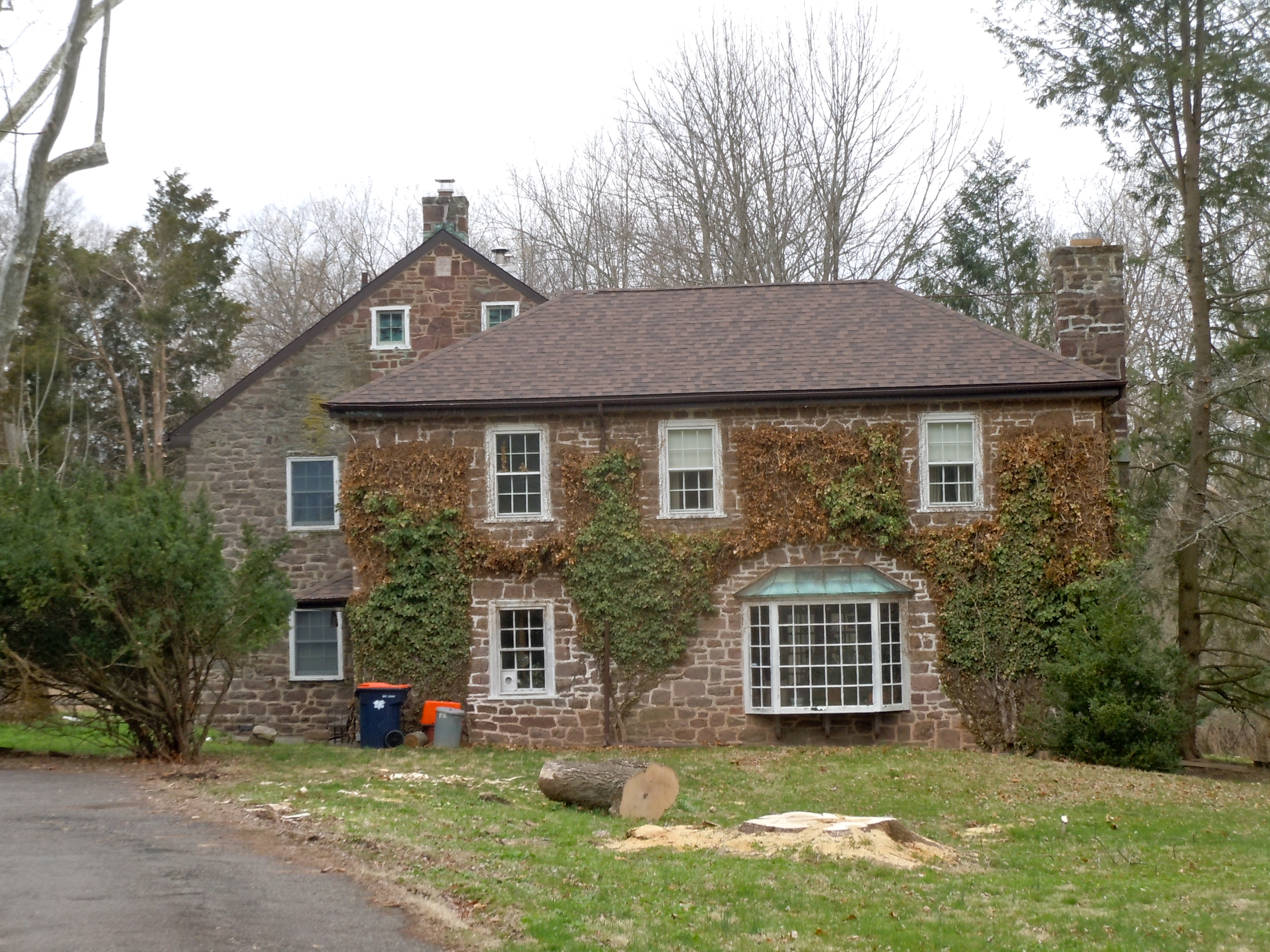
- Kuster Mill. April 2011.

- Location within Pennsylvania Location within the United States
- Location: On Skippack Creek at Mill Road and Water Street Road, Collegeville, Skippack Township, Pennsylvania
- Coordinates: 40°11′17″N 75°24′33″W
- Area: 8 acres (3.2 ha)
- Built: 1702
- NRHP reference No.: 71000711
- Added to NRHP: March 24, 1971

Kuster Mill, also known as Custer's Fulling Mill and Skippack Creek Farm, is an historic fulling mill in Evansburg State Park on Skippack Creek at Skippack Township, Montgomery County, Pennsylvania, United States.

It was added to the National Register of Historic Places in 1971.

== History and architectural features ==
The complex includes three contributing buildings and one contributing structure. They are the original mill, mill race, a stone house, and a Dutch bank barn.
