= Warren Z. Cole House =

Historic house in Pennsylvania, United States

- U.S. National Register of Historic Places
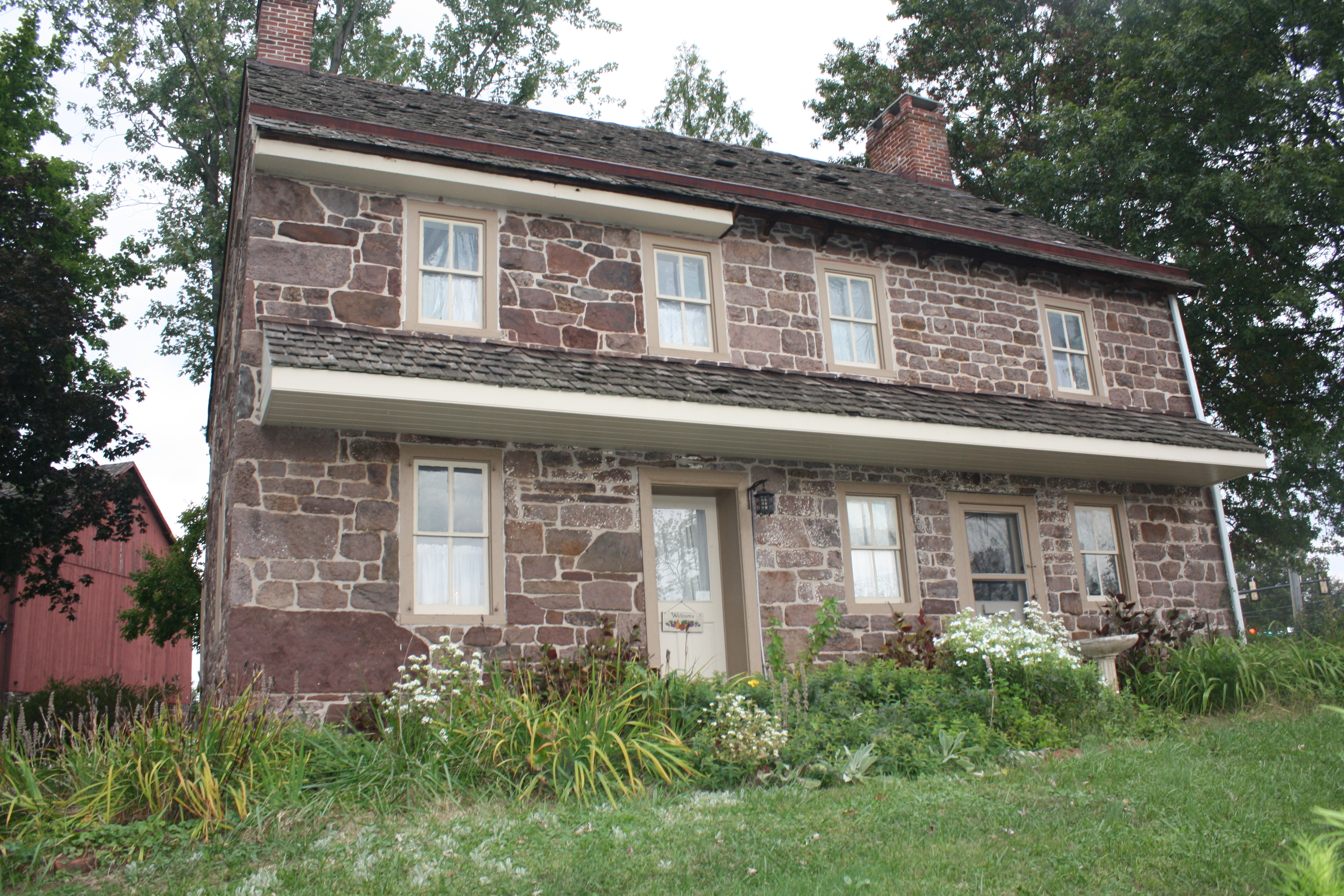
- Warren Z. Cole House. September 2012.

- Location within Pennsylvania Location within the United States
- Location: Skippack Pike and Evansburg Rd., Skippack, Pennsylvania
- Coordinates: 40°13′16″N 75°23′20″W
- Area: 2 acres (0.81 ha)
- NRHP reference No.: 73001653
- Added to NRHP: March 7, 1973

The Warren Z. Cole House, now known as Indenhofen Farm and also known as the Kidder-De Haven House, is an historic home that is located in Evansburg State Park at Skippack, Montgomery County, Pennsylvania, United States.

It was added to the National Register of Historic Places in 1973.

== History and architectural features ==
Built in 1725, this historic structure is a 2 1/2-story, brownstone dwelling that is four bays wide and two bays deep. It features gable end chimneys and a steep shingled gable roof. The property also includes a summer kitchen and bake oven and a Swiss/German bank barn. The property was restored, is open to the public and is operated by the Skippack Historical Society.
