= Evansburg State Park =

State park in Pennsylvania, United States

- A wooded area along a hiking trail in Evansburg State Park

- Location within Pennsylvania Location within the United States
- Interactive map of Evansburg State Park
- Location: Montgomery County, Pennsylvania, United States
- Coordinates: 40°12′03″N 75°24′14″W
- Area: 3,349 acres (1,355 ha)
- Elevation: 213 feet (65 m)
- Established: 1979
- Administrator: Pennsylvania Department of Conservation and Natural Resources
- Website: Official website
- Pennsylvania State Parks

Evansburg State Park is a 3,349-acre (1,355 ha) Pennsylvania state park in Lower Providence, Lower Salford, Skippack, Towamencin, and Worcester Townships in Montgomery County, Pennsylvania in the United States. The park has a variety of habitats including forests, meadows, old fields, and farmlands. The park offers a variety of recreational opportunities including picnicking, golf, ball fields, biking, hiking, hunting, horseback riding, and fishing. Evansburg State Park is near Collegeville and Norristown just off Pennsylvania Route 363.

== History ==
The land on which Evansburg State Park is located was originally part of a massive tract of land purchased from the Lenape (Delaware) by William Penn in 1684. The land was quickly settled according to Willam Penn's planned "Holy Experiment". The first settlers were the Mennonites. They fled religious persecution in Europe for the religious freedom, promised by William Penn in his colony. The Mennonites cleared the land of its old-growth forests and built farms, stores and mills that were powered by the waters of Skippack Creek. The area developed very rapidly and the Skippack Pike was constructed in 1714 to provide access to the markets of Philadelphia.

The area in and surrounding Evansburg State Park remained largely rural until World War II. The growth of suburbs and industry forever changed the landscape of the Skippack Valley. Evansburg State Park was established in 1979 to protect the rural qualities of the area and to provide outdoor recreational opportunities for the people of southeastern Pennsylvania. The original plan was for the construction of a high dam and lake for recreation, but this was met by local opposition, and the plan was scaled back.

The Indenhofen Farm is operated by the Skippack Historical Society and is open to the public. Kuster Mill is also located in the park.

== Recreation ==
=== Fishing and hunting ===
Skippack Creek is stocked with brown trout and rainbow trout; other fish in the creek include smallmouth bass, catfish, sucker, carp, panfish, and freshwater eel. All fishers are expected to follow the rules and regulations of the Pennsylvania Fish and Boat Commission.

About 1,000 acres (400 ha) of Evansburg State Park are open to hunting. Hunters are expected to follow the rules and regulations of the Pennsylvania Game Commission. The common game species are squirrels, pheasant, rabbits and white-tailed deer. The hunting of groundhogs is prohibited.

=== Golf ===
The golf course at Evansburg State Park is known as Skippack Golf Club. It is an 18-hole 6,007 yards (5,493 m), par 70 golf course. It was designed by Herris & Benahia, and opened in 1950. The course is managed by Skippack Golf Club, LLC under contract with the Pennsylvania Department of Conservation and Natural Resources.

=== Trails ===
Evansburg State Park has 26 miles (42 km) of trails that are open to hiking, horseback riding, cross-country skiing, and mountain biking. The 6 miles (9.7 km) of hiking trails are all rated as easy trails and pass through a variety of habitats. A mountain bike trail (5 miles (8.0 km)) is open at the south end of the park. Bikers are prohibited from using the hiking and equestrian trails. They are permitted to ride on the park roads. Fifteen miles of horseback riding trails are open at Evansburg State Park. Riders are also permitted to use the shoulders of the roads of the park.
