= Skippack, Pennsylvania =

Unincorporated community in Pennsylvania, US

Skippack Schippach originally named "Van Bebber's Township"
- Census-designated place
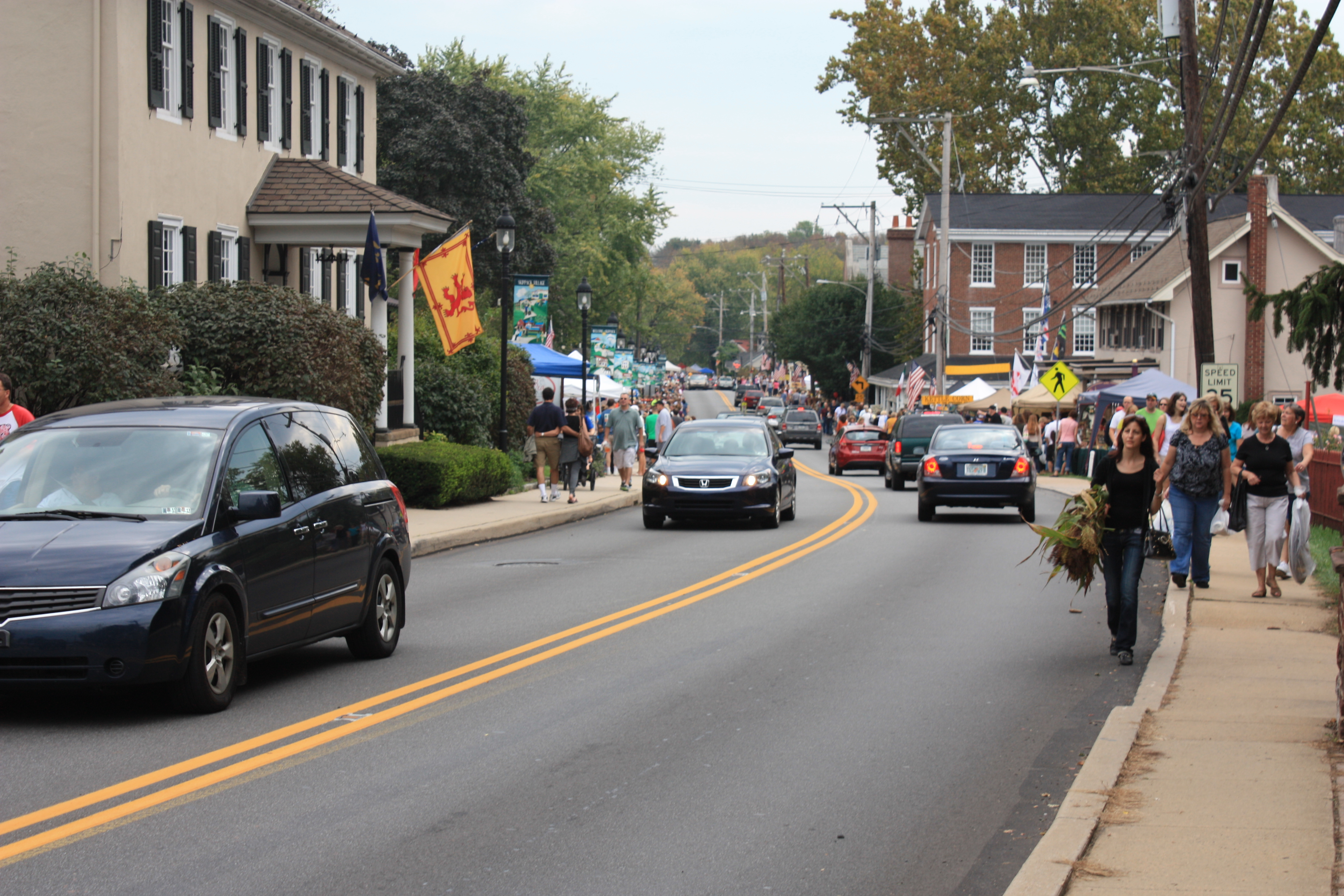

- Location of Skippack in Pennsylvania
- Coordinates: 40°13′37″N 75°23′56″W
- Country: United States
- State: Pennsylvania
- County: Montgomery
- Township: Skippack

Area
  - Total: 2.6 sq mi (6.7 km^{2})
  - Land: 2.5 sq mi (6.5 km^{2})
  - Water: 0.1 sq mi (0.26 km^{2})
- Elevation: 184 ft (56 m)

Population (2010)
  - Total: 3,758
  - Density: 1,500/sq mi (580/km^{2})
- Time zone: UTC-5 (EST)
  - Summer (DST): UTC-4 (EDT)
- ZIP Code: 19474
- Area codes: 610 and 484

Skippack (Pennsylvania German: Schippach), originally named "Van Bebber's Township", is a census-designated place (CDP) in Skippack Township, Pennsylvania, United States. The population was 3,758 at the 2010 census.

== History ==
In 1683, the Original 13, thirteen families from the lower Rhine River arrived at Philadelphia aboard the Concord, on October 6 of that year. These families were primarily linen weavers, but also knew how to farm. These first German immigrants left their homeland of Germany because of persecution they experienced as religious Anabaptist Mennonite and Quakers from the Catholic, Lutheran and Reformed Churches. Upon arriving at Philadelphia, the families were greeted by the representative of the Frankfort Land Company, a highly educated German lawyer, Franz Daniel Pastorius, who was charged with the authority to make land transactions with the thirteen families. After inspecting different areas of the vicinity of Philadelphia, the families settled on the land that was to become the villages of Germantown, Summerhousen, Crefeld, and Germantownship.

Within approximately twenty years Anabaptist German farmers in the Electorate of the Palatinate began to immigrate to Philadelphia in such numbers that Benjamin Franklin wrote an editorial fearing that Pennsylvania would soon become a majority German-speaking colony. As the Germantown area became more densely settled, there was a departure of some of the original families of Germantown to an area twenty miles west of Philadelphia further up the Schuylkill, purchasing land from the father in-law of Herman Isacks op den Graeff (an original settler of Germantown), who had earlier purchased approximately seven thousand acres. These German Mennonites brought the linen making business to the community, along with their farming skills. They settled on farms in the vicinity of Perkiomen Creek and Skippack Creek, up to a point where travel by boat became impossible because of shallow water. This point is where Skippack Creek crosses Skippack Pike in Skippack Township.

Skippack Township was originally named "Van Bebber's Township" after Matthias van Bebber, to whom the original land patent was issued in 1702 by William Penn, the founder of Pennsylvania. The name later changed to "Skippack and Perkiomen Township" until the township was split into two townships in 1726.

There are two theories as to the origin of the name "Skippack.” The first suggests it comes from the early German settlers, who named the town after the Bavarian village of Schippach. The second theory suggests the name is an anglicization of the Lenape word “Skappeu-hacki” (meaning “wet land” or “still waters”), which — like the Lenape word Perkiomen — was the name for the creek that passed through the township before it officially adopted the name Skippack Township.

Skippack Township is home to one of the oldest homes still standing in the area, the Indenhofen (De Haven) Farmstead, built in circa 1720. It was listed on the National Register of Historic Places in 1973, as the Warren Z. Cole House. Originally, the Indenhofen Farm consisted of 440 acres (1.8 km^{2}).

In 1795, Jacob Reiff bought a property at Store Road and Skippack Pike and opened a general merchandise store. In 1800, the store was sold to Jacob Sorver, who ran it until 1854. A post office was established in 1827 with weekly mail delivery by the Kutztown stagecoach.

The Souderton, Skippack & Fairview Electric Railway Co. was formed in 1901 to provide trolley service from Norristown, through Trooper and Worcester to Souderton. Trolley service to Skippack began in 1908. Harleysville was reached in 1912; the line to Souderton was never completed. The railway was renamed the Montgomery County Rapid Transit Company and later the Montgomery Transit Company. In 1923, its name was changed once again to the Skippack & Perkiomen Transit Company. The "Wogglebug" trolleys ran on the south shoulder of Skippack Pike through the village (a sidewalk was on the north side). Buses replaced the trolleys in 1925. In 1940 the bus service ended.

== Geography ==
Skippack is located at 40°13′37″N 75°23′56″W (40.227014, -75.398889).

According to the United States Census Bureau, the CDP has a total area of 2.6 square miles (6.7 km^{2}), of which 2.5 square miles (6.5 km^{2}) is land and 0.39% is water.

Skippack is a historic shopping village which lies within the boundaries of Skippack Township. Once termed Skippackville, the village served residents of Skippack with a post office, fire house, printing house, shirt factory, furniture maker, blacksmith, liquor store, a hat store and several inns. The village has recently seen an influx of unique restaurants and boutiques.

Creamery Village is located within Skippack Township and is partially within the CDP of Skippack. Creamery has its own post office for residents in the adjoining area.

== Demographics ==
Historical population
Census	Pop.	Note	%±
1990	8,790		—
2000	6,516		−25.9%
2010	3,758		−42.3%
2020	4,129		9.9%

=== 2020 census ===
As of the 2020 census, Skippack had a population of 4,129. The median age was 42.2 years. 23.8% of residents were under the age of 18 and 15.9% of residents were 65 years of age or older. For every 100 females there were 91.6 males, and for every 100 females age 18 and over there were 89.4 males age 18 and over.

97.9% of residents lived in urban areas, while 2.1% lived in rural areas.

There were 1,591 households in Skippack, of which 33.2% had children under the age of 18 living in them. Of all households, 60.7% were married-couple households, 11.2% were households with a male householder and no spouse or partner present, and 21.3% were households with a female householder and no spouse or partner present. About 22.9% of all households were made up of individuals and 11.4% had someone living alone who was 65 years of age or older.

There were 1,613 housing units, of which 1.4% were vacant. The homeowner vacancy rate was 0.5% and the rental vacancy rate was 3.7%.

Racial composition as of the 2020 census
Race	Number	Percent
White	3,576	86.6%
Black or African American	130	3.1%
American Indian and Alaska Native	2	0.0%
Asian	219	5.3%
Native Hawaiian and Other Pacific Islander	0	0.0%
Some other race	37	0.9%
Two or more races	165	4.0%
Hispanic or Latino (of any race)	111	2.7%

=== 2010 census ===
As of the 2010 census, the CDP was 89.6% Non-Hispanic White, 2.0% Black or African American, 5.1% Asian, 0.9% were Some Other Race, and 1.2% were two or more races. 2.2% of the population were of Hispanic or Latino ancestry.

=== 2000 census ===
As of the census of 2000, there were 2,889 people, 1,109 households, and 829 families residing in the CDP. The population density was 1,134.0 inhabitants per square mile (437.8/km^{2}). There were 1,152 housing units at an average density of 452.2 per square mile (174.6/km^{2}). The racial makeup of the CDP was 96.71% White, 1.00% African American, 0.45% Native American, 1.07% Asian, 0.21% from other races, and 0.55% from two or more races. Hispanic or Latino of any race were 1.32% of the population.

There were 1,109 households, out of which 35.9% had children under the age of 18 living with them, 64.9% were married couples living together, 7.7% had a female householder with no husband present, and 25.2% were non-families. 19.8% of all households were made up of individuals, and 3.6% had someone living alone who was 65 years of age or older. The average household size was 2.61 and the average family size was 3.03.

In the CDP, the population was spread out, with 25.9% under the age of 18, 4.6% from 18 to 24, 38.8% from 25 to 44, 22.5% from 45 to 64, and 8.2% who were 65 years of age or older. The median age was 35 years. For every 100 females, there were 93.5 males. For every 100 females age 18 and over, there were 91.3 males.

The median income for a household in the CDP was $66,486, and the median income for a family was $73,871. Males had a median income of $51,315 versus $40,179 for females. The per capita income for the CDP was $31,185. None of the families and 1.1% of the population were living below the poverty line, including no under eighteens and none of those over 64.

== Industry and attractions ==
The primary industry of Skippack village is tourism. During the week and on weekends the streets of Skippack are crowded with local residents and tourists visiting the many unique shops and restaurants, antique shops, art galleries, or just strolling along the village sidewalks. The town also offers year-round events and free concerts. A community theater, Playcrafters of Skippack, features productions year round.

Local merchants and restaurants throughout Skippack have joined forces to create Skippack First Fridays to encourage the public to re-discover the Village of Skippack and its hidden gems. The event is held every First Friday for the months of April through October from 5-9 p.m., as well as at various locations throughout the year. Activities include live music, exhibiting artists and entertainment for the whole family.

== Education ==
It is in the Perkiomen Valley School District.

== Notable people ==
- Philip Swenk Markley - Pennsylvania State Senator for the 7th district from 1820 to 1823. U.S. Representative for Pennsylvania's 5th congressional district from 1823 to 1827. Attorney General of Pennsylvania during 1829 and 1830.
