= David Luis Gonzalez =

U.S. artist and activist

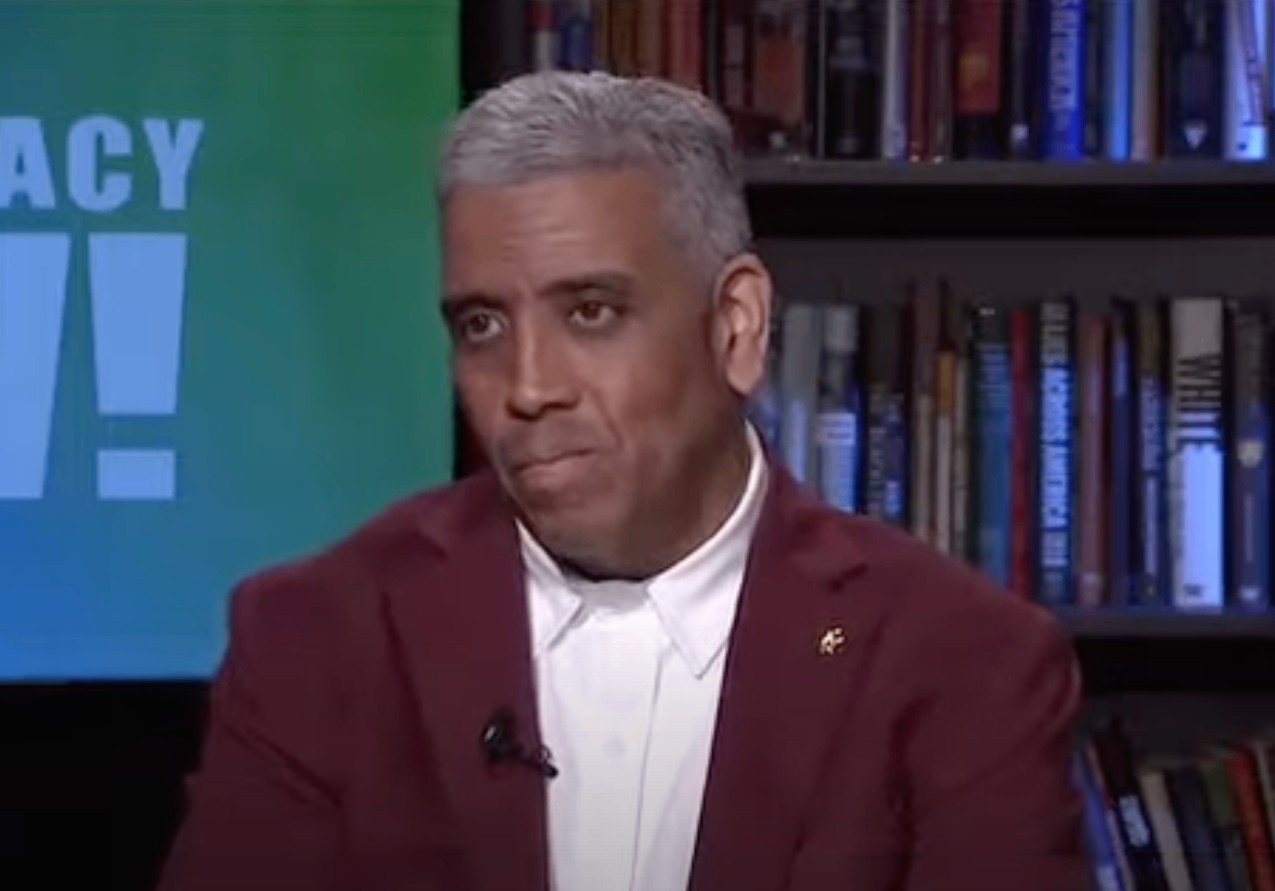
- Born: 1968 or 1969 (age 56–57)
- Other names: Suave
- Education: Bachelor's Degree from Villanova University
- Occupation(s): activist, artist
- Known for: released from prison on lifetime parole, after a Supreme Court ruling that banned life sentences for juveniles
- Notable work: Suave (podcast)
- Awards: Pulitzer Prize for Audio Reporting (2022)

David Luis "Suave" Gonzalez is an artist and activist who was sentenced to life without parole at age 17. He was released from prison in 2017 on lifetime parole, after a Supreme Court ruling that banned life sentences for juveniles. The podcast Suave, winner of a Pulitzer Prize in 2022, recounts his story as someone re-entering society after three decades in prison.

== Prison ==
Gonzalez grew up in the South Bronx. After his grandfather was murdered in front of him, his family moved to Philadelphia. When he was 17 years old, Gonzalez was arrested for the first-degree homicide of a 13-year-old boy. He was accused of shooting the boy while trying to steal his leather jacket. Gonzalez was sentenced to life without parole, which he served at State Correctional Institution – Graterford. Gonzalez later stated that he did not commit the crime.

According to Gonzalez, he was suicidal in prison and took part in many fights. He convinced his friend to invite journalist Maria Hinojosa as a guest speaker at Graterford after hearing her on the radio. After her talk, he asked for advice, and Hinojosa told him he could serve as her source about the criminal justice system and be a "voice for the voiceless". He credits this conversation with motivating him to improve his life. Hinojosa and Gonzalez met in 1993, stayed in touch, and eventually became friends. Gonzalez has said that having a friendship with someone outside of prison gave him hope and indicated that his "humanity wasn’t really lost".

When Gonzalez met Hinojosa, he was illiterate and believed that his IQ was 56. With the help of another inmate, Gonzalez learned how to read. After eight attempts, he completed his GED and later attained a bachelor's degree in education and marketing from Villanova University. Gonzalez served as president of LACEO, an organization which provides scholarships funded by incarcerated people, who are paid as little as 19 cents per hour. In 2014, Gonzalez gave a TEDx Talk at Graterford about LACEO and his life.

While Gonzalez was in prison, his mother died, and he was not permitted to attend her funeral.

== Release ==
In 2012, the United States Supreme Court found that mandatory sentences of life without parole are unconstitutional for juveniles in Miller v. Alabama. Four years later, in Montgomery v. Louisiana, the Court found that this also applied to people who had previously been sentenced.

At age 48, Gonzalez was released on November 20, 2017, on lifetime parole. That same day, he visited Esperanza College in Hunting Park, Philadelphia, to ask them to provide educational programs to incarcerated people. Additionally, he gave a speech at Esperanza Academy Charter School in which he asked for forgiveness from the community and urged students to stay out of prison. Hinjosa and a video crew accompanied him and filmed the events.

Since 2022, Gonzalez has worked with I Am More, a program at the Philadelphia Community College that assists formerly incarcerated individuals with re-entry through supportive services and education. Gonzalez still deals with trauma from his incarceration and has pointed to education, especially about technology, as key for preventing recidivism.

== Suave Podcast ==
Hinojosa recorded her conversations with Gonzalez, some of which were later included in Suave, a podcast about Gonzalez's life and the US criminal justice system. Due to the closeness of her relationship with Gonzalez, Hinojosa did not produce the show and recruited journalist Maggie Freleng to serve as her co-host. Suave was produced by PRX and Futuro Studios and released in 2021. The podcast won an International Documentary Association Award for Best Multi-Part Audio Documentary or Series and a Pulitzer Prize for Audio Reporting in 2022. The official Pulitzer announcement called Suave: "a brutally honest and immersive profile of a man reentering society after serving more than 30 years in prison." Season 2 premiered in April 2025.

== Art ==
Gonzalez is a painter and mixed media artist. While in prison, he created art with whatever materials he could find including coffee grounds and markers; he fashioned paint brushes from plastic spoons, glue from toothpaste, and paint from magazine photos and water. In collaboration with other artists, he painted a mural called Healing Walls in Graterford that was later installed in Philadelphia. After his release, Gonzalez participated in the 2018 Reimagining Reentry Fellowship run by Mural Arts Philadelphia. His artwork has been included in shows with other formerly incarcerated artists including "We are all doing Time" at the Morton Contemporary gallery in Philadelphia and "Faces of Resilience" at Mason Exhibitions in Arlington, Virginia. He continues to incorporate a wide variety of materials into his art including notebook wire, shoelaces, paint chips, and court documents.
