= Skippack Township, Pennsylvania =

Township in Pennsylvania, US

Skippack Township
- Township
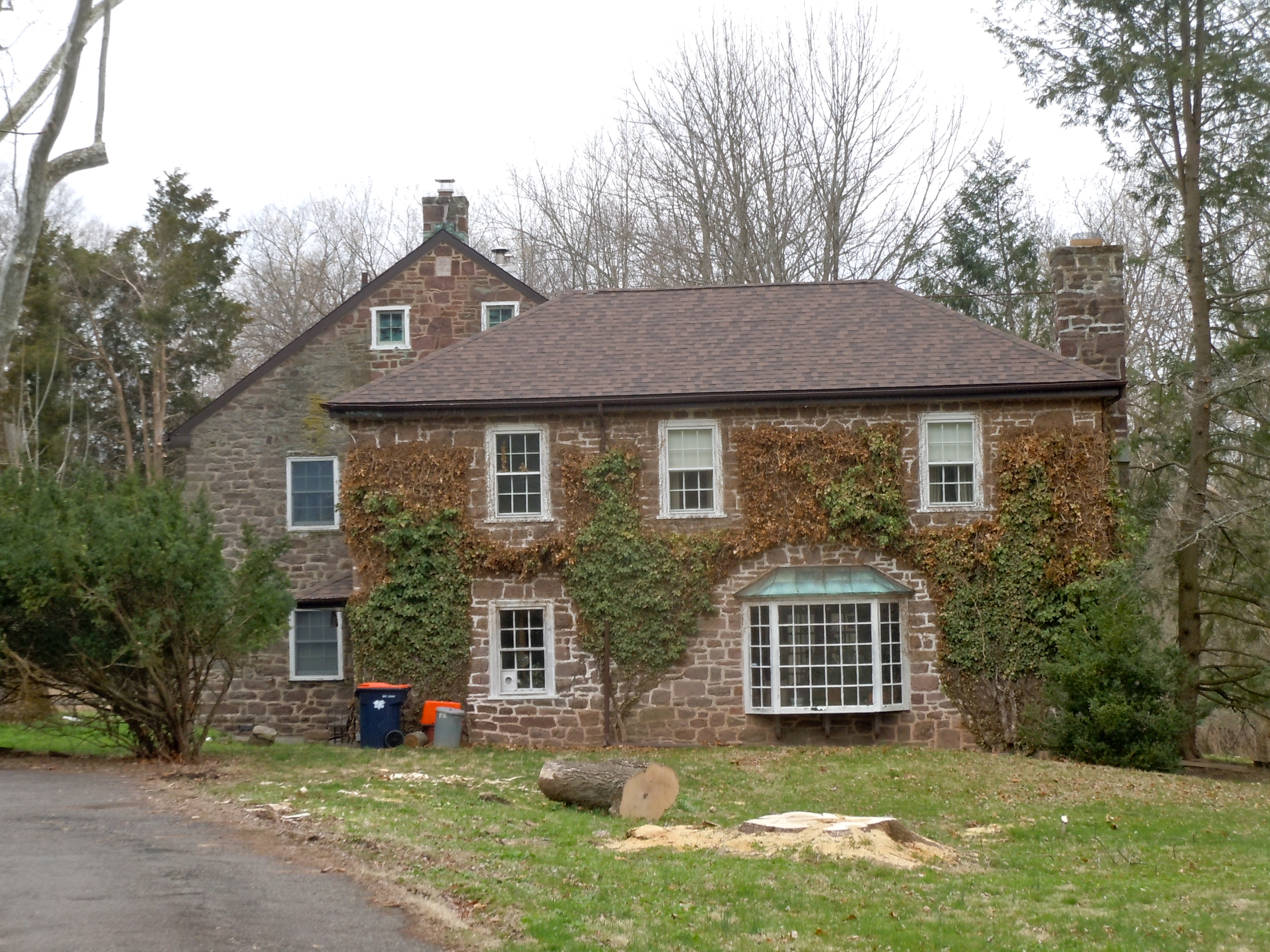
- Kuster Mill, built 1702

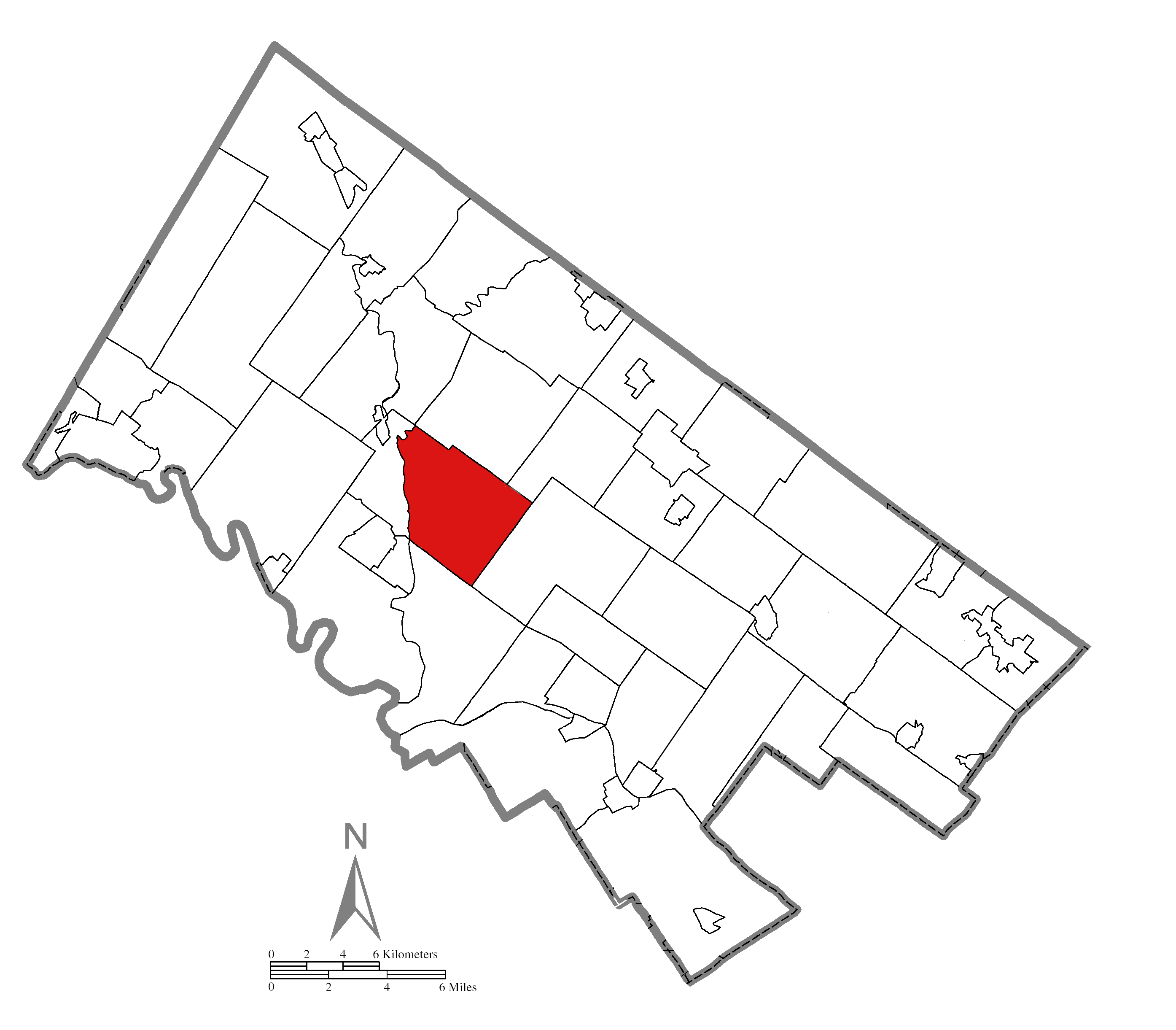
- Location of Skippack in Montgomery County Pennsylvania
- Coordinates: 40°12′57″N 75°24′58″W
- Country: United States
- State: Pennsylvania
- County: Montgomery

Area
  - Total: 13.97 sq mi (36.17 km^{2})
  - Land: 13.84 sq mi (35.84 km^{2})
  - Water: 0.13 sq mi (0.33 km^{2})
- Elevation: 272 ft (83 m)

Population (2020)
  - Total: 14,386
  - Estimate (2022): 14,408
  - Density: 1,064.3/sq mi (410.92/km^{2})
- Time zone: UTC-5 (EST)
  - Summer (DST): UTC-4 (EDT)
- Area code: 610
- FIPS code: 42-091-71016
- Website: www.skippacktownship.org

Skippack Township is a township in Montgomery County, Pennsylvania, United States. The population was 14,408 in 2022 according to the Census Bureau. This represents a 5.1% increase from the 2010 Census.

== History ==
The Kuster Mill was listed on the National Register of Historic Places in 1971.

== Geography ==
According to the United States Census Bureau, the township has a total area of 14.0 square miles (36.2 km^{2}), of which 13.8 square miles (35.8 km^{2}) is land and 0.2 square miles (0.4 km^{2}) (1.14%) is water. The Perkiomen Creek forms its natural western boundary and drains it into the Schuylkill River. Its villages include Creamery, Lucon, Providence Square (also in Worcester Township), Skippack, and part of Evansburg.

=== Neighboring municipalities ===
- Lower Salford Township (northeast)
- Towamencin Township (east)
- Worcester Township (southeast)
- Lower Providence Township (south)
- Collegeville (tangent to the southwest)
- Perkiomen Township (west)

=== Climate ===
The township has a hot-summer humid continental climate (Dfa) and average monthly temperatures in the village of Skippack range from 30.7 °F in January to 75.4 °F in July. The hardiness zones are 6b and 7a.

== Transportation ==
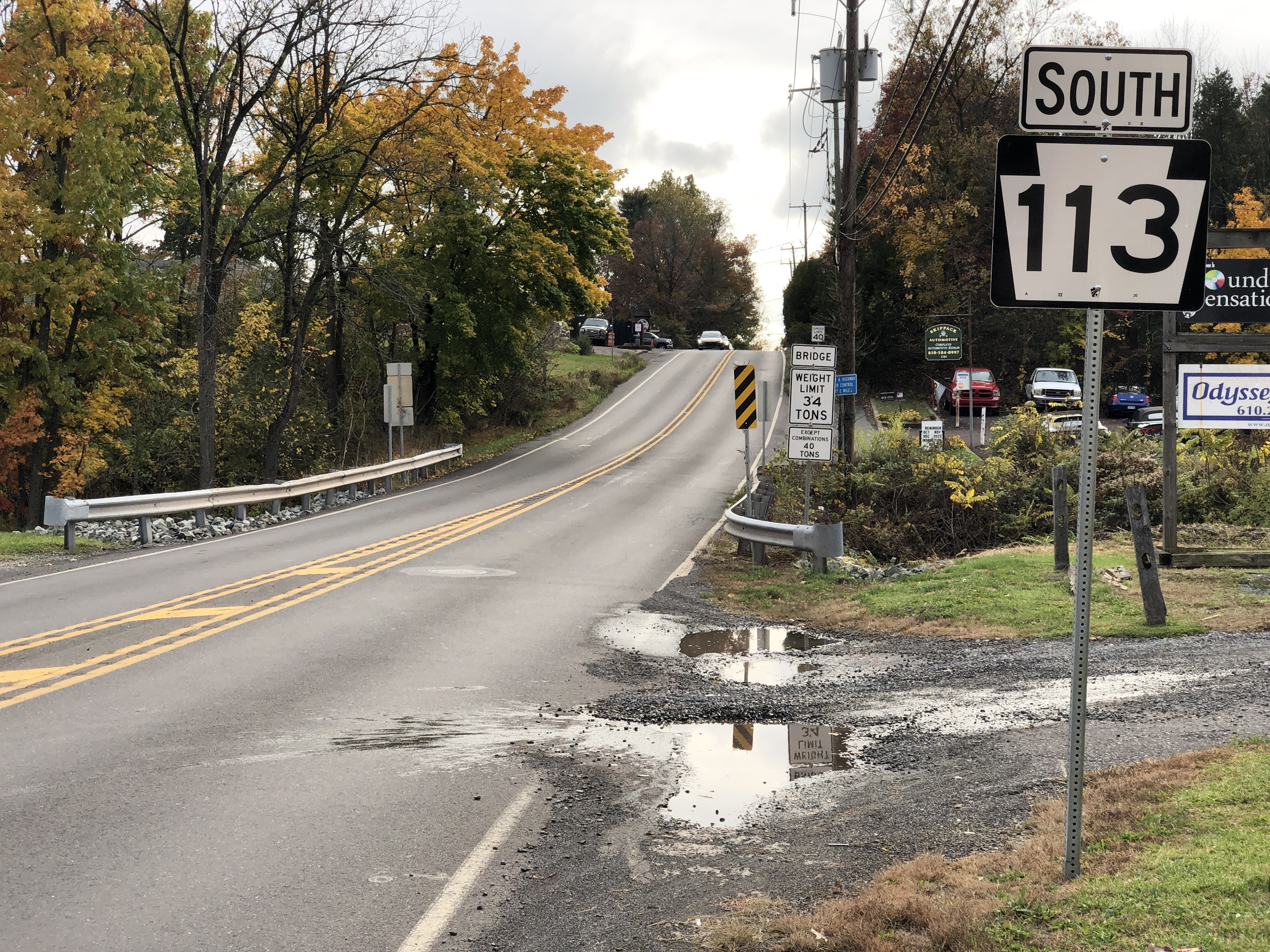
PA 113 southbound in Skippack Township

As of 2020 there were 67.44 miles (108.53 km) of public roads in Skippack Township, of which 21.09 miles (33.94 km) were maintained by the Pennsylvania Department of Transportation (PennDOT) and 46.35 miles (74.59 km) were maintained by the township.

The main highways serving Skippack Township are Pennsylvania Route 73 and Pennsylvania Route 113. PA 73 follows Skippack Pike along a northwest-southeast alignment across the northern and northeastern portions of the township, while PA 113 traverses northeast-to-southwest along Bridge Road.

SEPTA provides Suburban Bus service to Skippack Township along Route 91, which provides Saturday service between the Norristown Transportation Center in Norristown and State Correctional Institution – Phoenix.

== Institutions ==
The main industry is the State Correctional Institution – Phoenix, which replaced State Correctional Institution – Graterford in 2018. Situated on over 1,700 acres (6.9 km^{2}) of state land, the facility, built in 1929, is Pennsylvania's largest maximum-security prison, holding about 3,500 prisoners. SCI Graterford has an extensive prison farm on its 1,730 acres (7.0 km^{2}) and the 62-acre (250,000 m^{2}) prison compound itself lies within 30-foot (9.1 m) high walls surmounted by nine staffed towers. Prison factories and industries employ 21 civilian staff and 315 inmate staff. An example is the Garment Factory which provides inmates with shirts, trousers, insulated coveralls, baseball caps, bibs, and handkerchiefs.

The main attractions to Skippack are Evansburg State Park, the Central Montgomery Park and the historic shopping village, Skippack Village. The State Park offers a variety of recreational opportunities including hunting, fishing, horse back riding and an 18-hole golf course.

== Demographics ==
Historical population
Census	Pop.	Note	%±
1930	1,994		—
1940	3,224		61.7%
1950	3,843		19.2%
1960	4,729		23.1%
1970	5,265		11.3%
1980	5,784		9.9%
1990	8,790		52.0%
2000	6,516		−25.9%
2010	13,715		110.5%
2020	14,386		4.9%
2022 (est.)	14,408		0.2%

As of the 2020 census, the township was 71.7.0% White, 18.8% Black or African American, 0.1% Native American, 5.2% Asian, and 1.2% were two or more races. 4.4% of the population were of Hispanic or Latino ancestry.

As of 2021 there were 3,873 households, with 2.7 persons per household. 83% of households were married couples, 8% non-family residents, 8% female householder, and 1% male householder. The population density was 1,021.4 people per square mile. There were 4,075 housing units, 93% of which were owner occupied. The median value of owner-occupied housing units was $414,500, which was about 25 higher than Montgomery County, and more than double that of Pennsylvania.

The median age was 45.4, with 18% under the age of 18, 66% 18 to 64, and 16% 65 and over. 64% of the population was male, and 36% female. 56% of residents were married, 8% were veterans, and 6.7% were foreign-born. 85.1% were a high school graduate or higher and 41.3% had completed a bachelor's or post-graduate degree.

The median household income in the township was $128,672, and the median per capita income was $47,707. The poverty rate, at 0.4% was below the county (5.9%) and state (11.8%) rates. Reported rates of poverty for children under 18 were 0.0% and 1.0% for people 65 and over.

== Government and politics ==
Presidential elections results
Year	Republican	Democratic
2020	45.5% 3,388	52.8% 3,933
2016	48.5% 2,975	46.5% 2,848
2012	55.2% 3,115	43.6% 2,464
2008	50.3% 2,809	49.0% 2,737
2004	56.2% 2,522	43.4% 1,948
2000	56.1% 1,643	41.4% 1,211
1996	47.4% 1,010	37.8% 805
1992	43.4% 962	31.0% 687

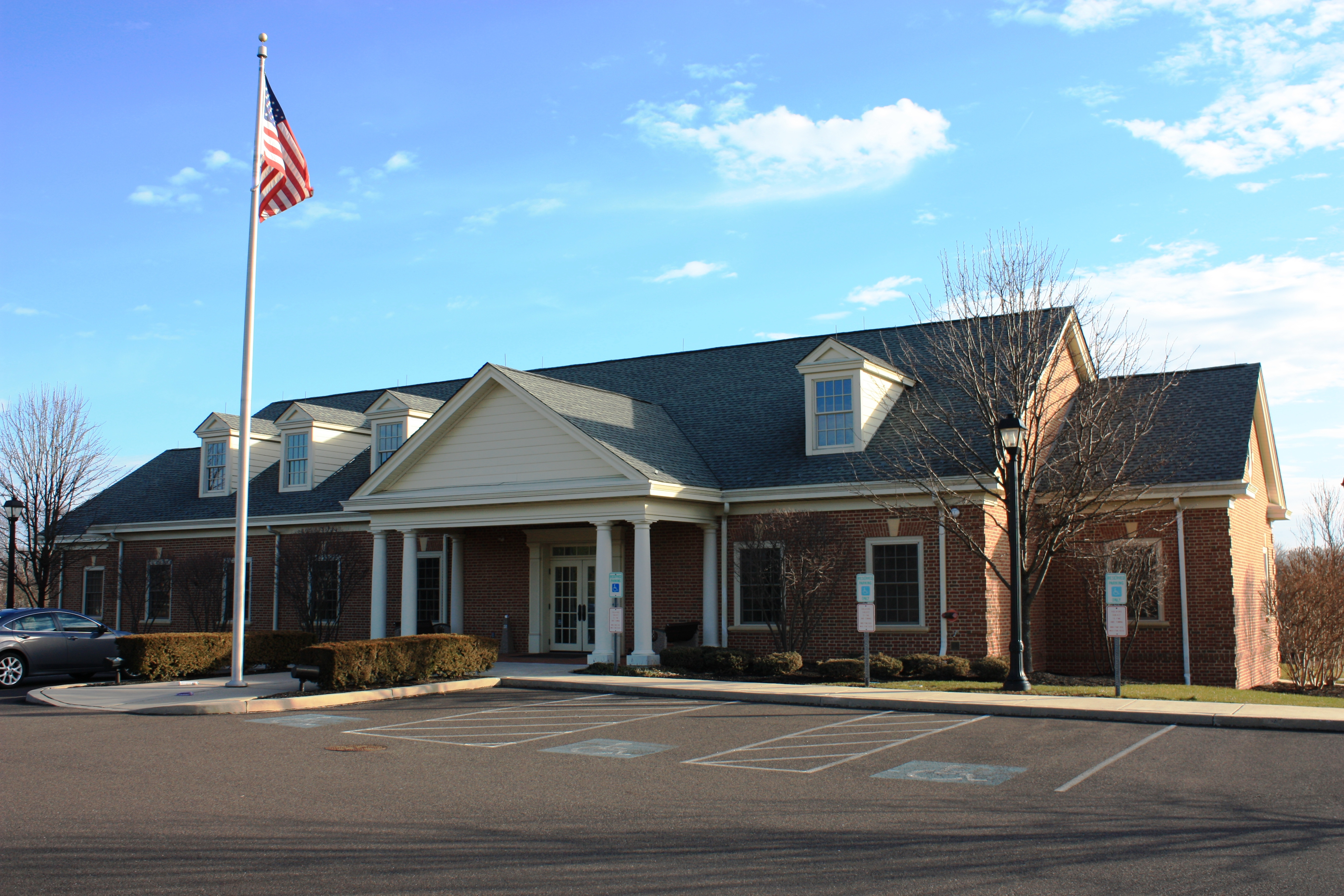
Skippack Township Building

Skippack Township is run by an elected five person Board of Supervisors, each of whom serve staggered six year terms. The current supervisors are Chairman Franco D'Angelo (R), Vice Chairman Paul Fox (R), Nick Fountain (R), Ben Webb (I) and Barbara McGinnis (R).

Other elected offices include the Tax Collector, Laurie Augustine (R), the Board of Auditors, Tom Biggar (D), Phil Wimpenney (D) and Bohdan Marchuk (R) and the Constable, Luke DiElsi (R).

The Pennsylvania Department of Corrections operates the State Correctional Institution – Phoenix in Skippack Township; it has a Collegeville postal address. The department formerly operated the State Correctional Institution - Graterford within the township. SCI Graterford closed in July 2018 and was replaced by SCI Phoenix.

== Education ==
Perkiomen Valley School District operates public schools.

Most residents are zoned to Skippack Elementary School, while some are zoned to Schwenksville Elementary School. Some residents are zoned to Middle School West while others are zoned to Middle School East. All district residents are zoned to Perkiomen Valley High School.
