= State Correctional Institution – Graterford =

U.S. state prison

- Interactive map of State Correctional Institution – Graterford
- Location: Skippack Township, Montgomery County, Pennsylvania, U.S.; 40°13′57″N 75°25′57″W
- Status: Closed
- Security class: Maximum
- Opened: 1929
- Closed: 2018
- Managed by: Pennsylvania Department of Corrections

The State Correctional Institution – Graterford, commonly referred to as SCI Graterford, known prior as Eastern Correctional Institution, Graterford Prison, Graterford Penitentiary, and the Graterford Prison Farm, was a Pennsylvania Department of Corrections prison located in Skippack Township, Montgomery County, Pennsylvania, near Graterford. The prison, located on Graterford Road off of Pennsylvania Route 29, was about 31 miles (50 km) northwest of Philadelphia.

The prison, described by Joseph Stefano of The Philadelphia Inquirer as the primary state prison serving the Philadelphia metropolitan area, once housed a small number of male death row inmates. Graterford closed in 2018 and was replaced by SCI Phoenix.

== History ==
The facility, built in 1929, was Pennsylvania's largest maximum-security prison, holding about 3,500 prisoners. It replaced functions at Eastern State Penitentiary in Philadelphia, which had previously experienced some disturbances.

The Graterford grounds include an extensive prison farm on 1,730 acres (7.0 km^{2}); the 62-acre (250,000 m^{2}) prison compound itself lies within 30-foot (9.1 m) high walls surmounted by nine staffed towers. An $80 million construction program completed in 1989 added a new administration building, a 28-bed infirmary, and 372 additional cells.

As recently as 1978 the prison held only about 1,600 prisoners in 2,000 available cells distributed among five major cellblocks of 400 cells each. The five major cellblocks were supplemented by about 40 cells in a security unit known as BAU (Behavior Adjustment Unit) or RHU (Restricted Housing Unit); this unit included a special death row section (though executions were never carried out at this prison). The original 1929 plan for the facility included eight major cellblocks of 400 cells each, or 3,200 individual cells. An engraving of this plan is found on a brass plaque just inside the facility's double-gated airlock-type main entrance.

On 4 November 1981, a group of inmates attempted to escape Graterford with firearms they had smuggled into the facility. When they were unable to escape, they took 29 inmates and six prison employees hostage for five days. The situation was defused by Chuck Stone of the Philadelphia Daily News, who secured the surrender of the rebel inmates in his role as an outside negotiator.

The prison's two Restricted Housing Units (RHU) housed over 300 prisoners — about 10 percent of the total prison population — who were allowed one hour a day for exercise, remaining confined to their cells the other 23, where they received three meals a day and were permitted shower visits. The prisoners in RHU were allowed only one visitor per month. SCI-Graterford had a 22-bed Mental Health Unit contracted to MHM Services to facilitate a mental health program.

SCI-Graterford Industries provided work and economic activity within the prison, including a garment factory, undergarment factory, shoe factory, weave plant, hosiery factory, carton factory, and a mail distribution center. Prison factories and industries employed 21 civilian staff, 315 inmate staff, and in 2003–2004 generated revenues of $4,450,940.01. The prison also conducted farming operations and educational programs.

In 2012, seven activists from the organization Decarcerate PA were arrested for blocking the entrance of the Graterford construction site.

In the final period of operations, Cynthia Link, the superintendent of Graterford and the prospective superintendent of Graterford's replacement facility, SCI Phoenix, resigned and retired. Laurel Harry, previously the superintendent of SCI Camp Hill, became the interim superintendent.

SCI Phoenix opened in July 2018. The state began moving Graterford prisoners there on July 11, 2018, and Graterford ended operations on July 15, 2018. All Graterford employees became Phoenix employees. Some inmates disliked the move as they feared they would be sharing cells with other inmates, while at Graterford they had single cells. The population of Graterford was reduced so the transfer of inmates to Phoenix would not involve as many people.

== Programs ==
Graterford had a music program for inmates, Songs in the Key of Free, run by volunteers and established in October 2016. A previous musical program ended around 2006. The program ended on May 21, 2018 as a result of Graterford's closure. The stress-reduction and therapy programs from Rutgers University professor Nancy Wolff were also terminated as part of the move.

== Notable inmates ==
- Ira Einhorn, environmental activist and convicted murderer; after extradition from France in 2001, spent his first month at Graterford before transfer to SCI Houtzdale.
- George Feigley, sex cult leader; incarcerated at Graterford from 1979 to 1981, then transferred to Western Penitentiary after plans to escape by helicopter were discovered.
- David Luis Gonzalez, artist and activist, subject of the Pultizer Prize winning podcast Suave
- Bernard Hopkins, spent several years at Graterford before beginning his boxing career.
- Meek Mill, Philadelphia rapper, incarcerated at Graterford from 2017 to 2018.
- Pep, Labrador Retriever that belonged to governor Gifford Pinchot
