= Graterford, Pennsylvania =

Unincorporated community in Pennsylvania, US

Coordinates: 40°13′32″N 75°27′17″W

Graterford is an unincorporated community in Perkiomen Township, Montgomery County, Pennsylvania, United States.

Founded in 1756 by Jacob Kreator, a textile weaver, Graterford was originally named Grater's Ford until abbreviated to Graterford by the postal service in the mid-1950s. A state penitentiary is located there, which was originally a prison farm.

Located along the Perkiomen Creek, Graterford was a vital summer resort community during the late nineteenth and early twentieth centuries. Baptisms were held on a small island in the middle of the Perkiomen. A non-denominational church is located there. Railroad service to Philadelphia was provided until 1955. A post office operated there until the early 1960s. At various times, principal enterprises have included a general store, hardware store, delicatessen, bakery, auto service stations, hair salons, an antique furniture dealer, three hotels and resort lodging. Primarily an agricultural area through the mid-20th century, it is located 25 miles northwest of Philadelphia. It is at the center of Perkiomen Township, of which it is a part. The Perkiomen Valley School District High School is also located here. Scenic appeal is provided by the Perkiomen Creek and two tributaries, Lodal Creek and Landis Run. The Graterford name continues to fade as newer residents adopt the nearby Collegeville name, whose postal zip code Graterford shares. Other places of interest are the Perkiomen Trail and Central Perkiomen Valley Park.

Graterford is a community separate from Collegeville. There has been an increase in population in the last 10 years as farmers have sold land to companies who build houses.

== Education ==
Perkiomen Township is a part of the Perkiomen Valley School District. All residents are zoned to Perkiomen Valley High School.

== Government and infrastructure ==
The Pennsylvania Department of Corrections State Correctional Institution - Graterford was in nearby Skippack Township. It closed in July 2018 and was replaced by State Correctional Institution – Phoenix.
