= Quakertown station =

Historic train station

Quakertown
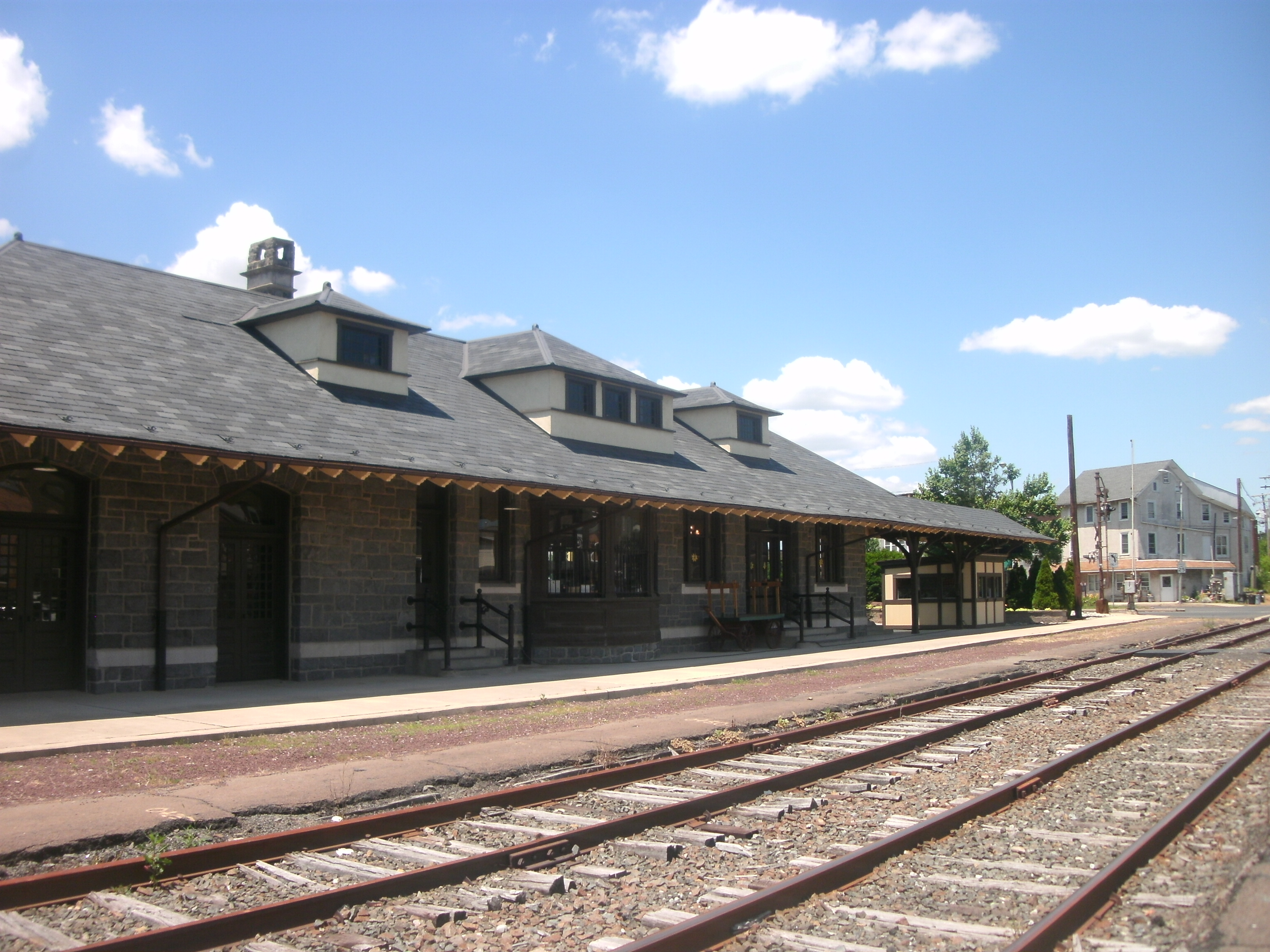
- The former station depot at Quakertown station, as seen from the Allentown-bound platform in June 2012

General information
- System: Former SEPTA regional rail station
- Owner: Quakertown Train Station Historical Society
- Line: Bethlehem Line
- Tracks: 2 (originally 3)

Construction
- Platform levels: 1
- Parking: Yes
- Accessible: No

Other information
- Website: quakertowntrainstation.org

History
- Closed: July 26, 1981

Former services
| Preceding station | SEPTA | Following station |
|---|---|---|
| Perkasie toward Reading Terminal | Bethlehem Line | Centre Valley toward Allentown |
| Preceding station | Reading Railroad | Following station |
| Rockhill toward Philadelphia | Bethlehem Branch | Shelly toward Bethlehem |
- Quakertown Passenger and Freight Station
- U.S. National Register of Historic Places
- Interactive map of Quakertown Passenger and Freight Station
- Location: Front and East Broad Streets, Quakertown, Pennsylvania
- Coordinates: 40°26′23″N 75°20′4″W
- Area: 2.9 acres (1.2 ha)
- Built: 1889, 1902
- Built by: Cramp and Co.
- Architect: Wilson Brothers
- Architectural style: Late Victorian
- NRHP reference No.: 00000382
- Added to NRHP: April 14, 2000
Location

The Quakertown Passenger and Freight Station is a historic train station and freight depot located at Quakertown, Bucks County, Pennsylvania. The two buildings were designed by Wilson Bros. & Company in 1889 and built by Cramp and Co. for the Philadelphia and Reading Railroad in 1902. The passenger station is constructed of dark Rockhill granite and Indiana limestone and is in a Late Victorian style. It is 1 1/2 stories tall and measures 25 feet (7.6 meters) wide by 97 feet 6 inches (29.72 meters), long. It has a hipped roof with an eight-foot overhang. The freight station is a 1 1/2-story, rectangular stone block building measuring 128 by 30 feet (39.0 by 9.1 meters). Also on the property is a large crane that was used for freight movement. The Quakertown station had passenger rail service along the Bethlehem Line to Bethlehem and Philadelphia until July 27, 1981, when SEPTA ended service on all its intercity diesel-powered lines. SEPTA still owns the line and leases it to the East Penn Railroad. Other towns, stations, and landmarks on the Bethlehem Line are Perkasie, Perkasie Tunnel, and Perkasie station.

It was added to the National Register of Historic Places in 2000.

Lehigh Valley Transit interurbans ran on Main Street, roughly one mile to the west.

== See also ==
- National Register of Historic Places listings in Bucks County, Pennsylvania
