= Centre Valley station =

Centre Valley
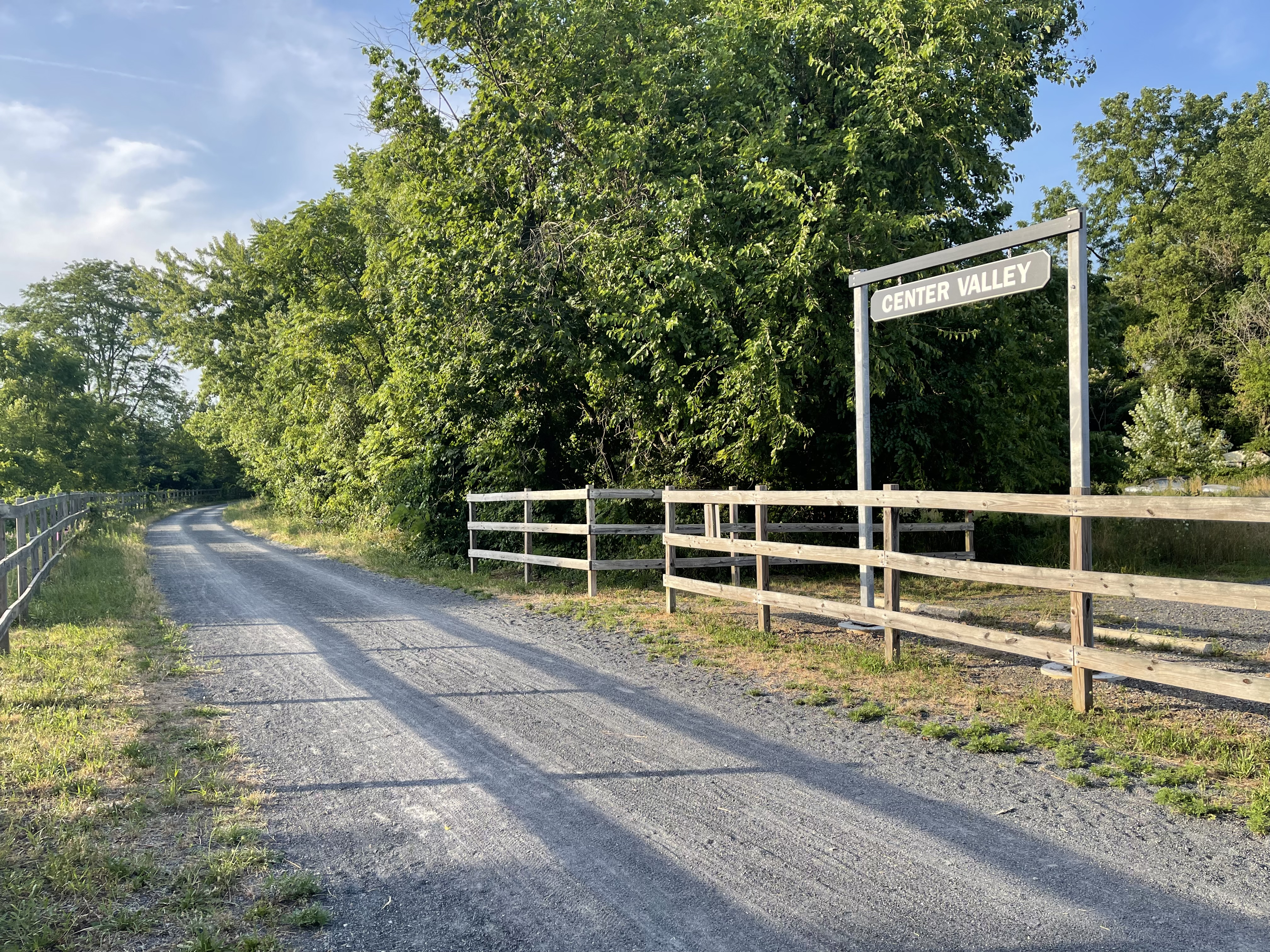
- Centre Valley station on the Saucon Rail Trail in Center Valley, Pennsylvania in 2022

General information
- Location: Station Road and New Street, Center Valley, Pennsylvania, U.S. USA
- Coordinates: 40°31′47″N 75°23′23″W
- System: Former SEPTA regional rail station
- Line: Bethlehem Line
- Tracks: 1

Construction
- Parking: No
- Accessible: No

History
- Closed: June 30, 1981

Former services
Preceding station	SEPTA	Following station
Quakertown toward Reading Terminal	Bethlehem Line	Hellertown toward Allentown
Preceding station	Reading Railroad	Following station
Coopersburg toward Philadelphia	Bethlehem Branch	Bingen toward Bethlehem
Location

Center Valley is a defunct train station formerly operated by SEPTA Regional Rail on the former Bethlehem Line in Center Valley in the Lehigh Valley region of eastern Pennsylvania in the United States. It closed in 1981 when SEPTA terminated all diesel train service and was subsequently demolished.
