= Perkasie station =

Perkasie
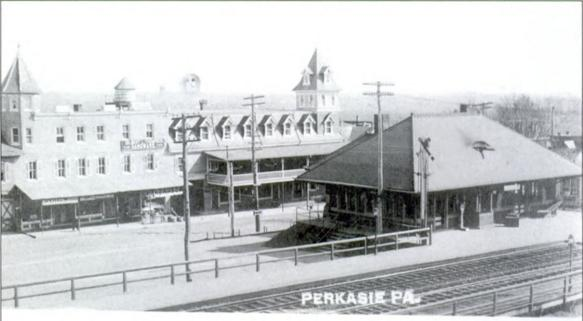
- Train station and Union Hotel in Perkasie, Pennsylvania, USA, shown in a 1910 postcard.

General information
- Location: 8th Street, Perkasie, Bucks County, Pennsylvania; USA
- Coordinates: 40.3744°N 75.2968°W
- System: Former SEPTA regional rail station
- Operator: North Pennsylvania Railroad, Reading Company, Conrail, SEPTA Regional Rail
- Line: Bethlehem Branch
- Tracks: 2
- Train operators: North Pennsylvania Railroad, Reading Company, Conrail, SEPTA Regional Rail

Construction
- Parking: No
- Accessible: No

History
- Closed: July 26, 1981

Former services
Preceding station	SEPTA	Following station
Lansdale toward Reading Terminal	Bethlehem Line	Quakertown toward Allentown
Sellersville toward Reading Terminal	Bethlehem Line	Quakertown toward Allentown
Preceding station	Reading Railroad	Following station
Sellersville toward Philadelphia	Bethlehem Branch	Rockhill toward Bethlehem
Location

Perkasie is a defunct train station formerly operated by SEPTA Regional Rail in Perkasie, Pennsylvania, USA. It closed on July 29, 1981, after SEPTA cancelled its diesel train routes.

The station was formerly operated by the Reading Company and later by Conrail and SEPTA. East Penn Railroad operates freight trains on the line between Lansdale, and beyond. However, active track ends just north of Quakertown.

The Perkasie Tunnel is located near the station.

The station was formerly equipped with a water tower, of which not a trace remains.

Lehigh Valley Transit interurbans used a separate station at Walnut and Penn, several blocks to the south and east.
