= Hellertown station =

Railway station in Hellertown, Pennsylvania

Hellertown
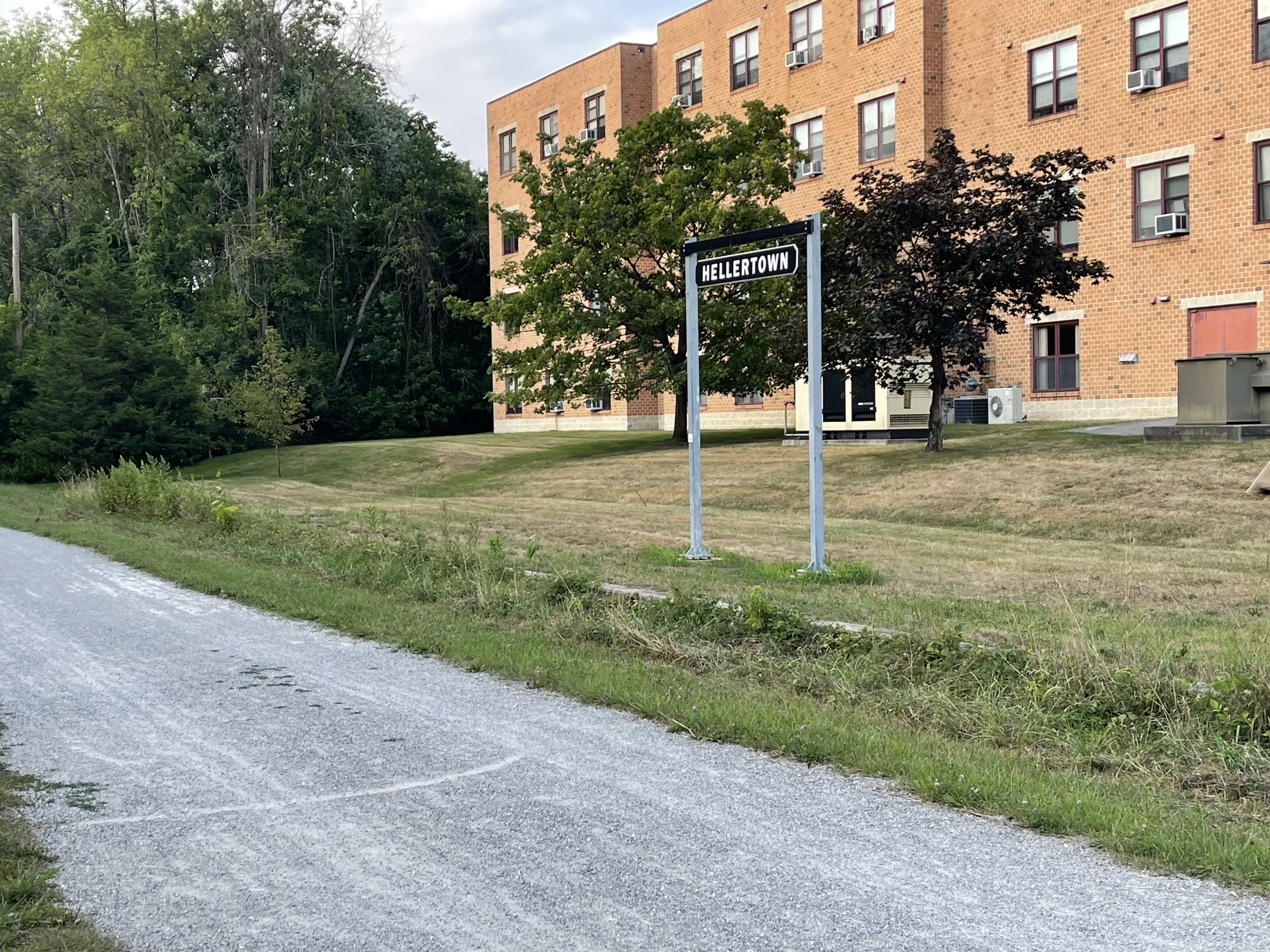
- Hellertown station location on the Saucon Rail Trail

General information
- Location: 1090 Front Street, Hellertown, Pennsylvania, U.S.
- Line: Bethlehem Line
- Tracks: 2

Construction
- Platform levels: 1
- Accessible: No

History
- Opened: c. 1851
- Closed: June 30, 1981

Key dates
- December 6, 1982: Station depot razed

Former services
Preceding station	SEPTA	Following station
Centre Valley toward Reading Terminal	Bethlehem Line	Bethlehem Closed 1981 toward Allentown
Preceding station	Reading Railroad	Following station
Bingen toward Philadelphia	Bethlehem Branch	Bethlehem Terminus
Location

The Hellertown station was a train station which was located in Hellertown, Pennsylvania on the former Bethlehem Line of the North Pennsylvania Railroad. Closed in July 1981, it was razed on December 6, 1982; no trace of it remains.

== History and architectural features ==
In 1871, the Hellertown station was one of thirty-three stations that were erected along a 54.6-mile line of the North Penn Railroad that ran from Berks Street in Philadelphia to Bethlehem Union Station in Bethlehem, Pennsylvania.

This station was last used by SEPTA diesel service and was closed in July 1981 after SEPTA terminated all diesel routes.

The station was razed on December 6, 1982.
