= Telford, Pennsylvania =

Borough in the United States

- Borough
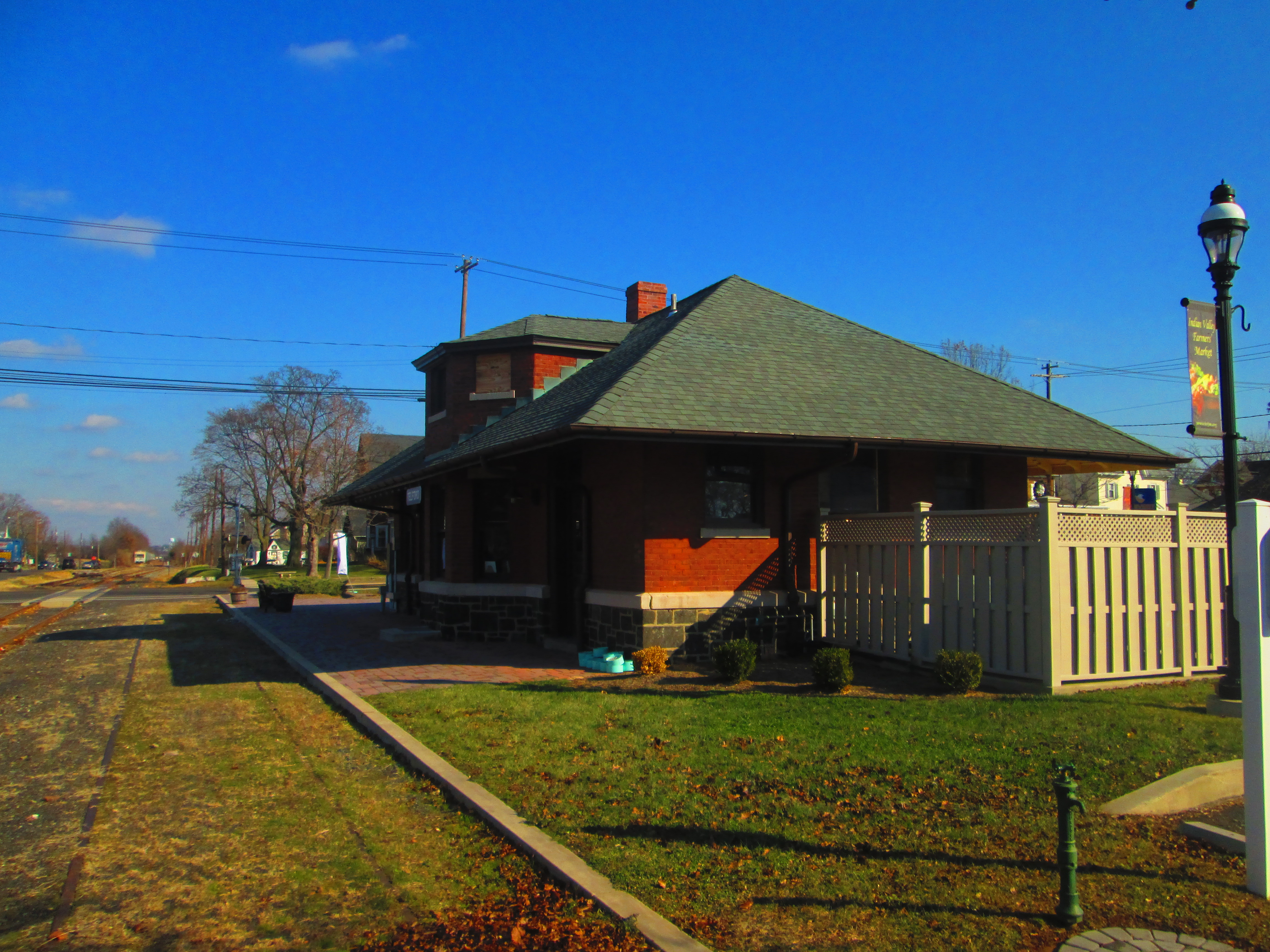
- The former Reading Railroad and SEPTA station in Telford

- Seal

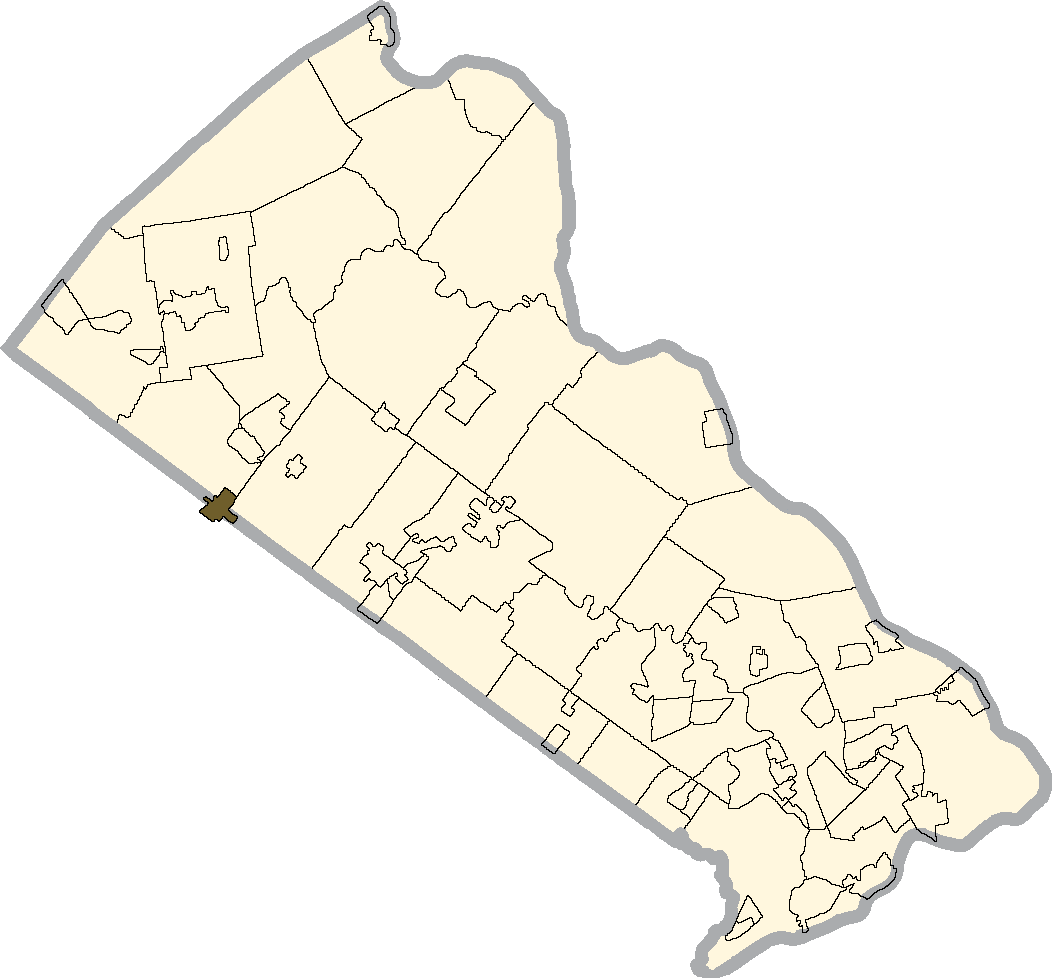
- Location in Bucks County, Pennsylvania

- Location in Pennsylvania Location in the United States
- Coordinates: 40°19′29″N 75°19′41″W
- Country: United States
- State: Pennsylvania
- Counties: Bucks, Montgomery
- Settled: 1719
- Incorporated: 1886

Government
  - Mayor: David S. Snook

Area
  - Total: 1.01 sq mi (2.61 km^{2})
  - Land: 1.01 sq mi (2.61 km^{2})
  - Water: 0 sq mi (0.00 km^{2})
- Elevation: 423 ft (129 m)

Population (2010)
  - Total: 4,872
  - Estimate (2019): 4,894
  - Density: 4,859.0/sq mi (1,876.06/km^{2})
- Time zone: UTC-5 (EST)
  - Summer (DST): UTC-4 (EDT)
- ZIP Code: 18969
- Area codes: 215, 267, and 445
- FIPS code: 42-76304
- Website: www.telfordborough.org

Telford is a borough in Bucks and Montgomery counties in the U.S. state of Pennsylvania. As of the 2020 census, Telford had a population of 4,928.

== History ==
=== Founding ===
Originally inhabited by the Lenape people, the area surrounding Telford began to be settled in 1719 by Mennonites from the Palatinate of the Rhine. In 1857, the town known as County Line, the area that had previously been known as Hendrick's Blacksmith, changed its name to Telford after the North Pennsylvania Railroad Company, which was later absorbed into Reading Railroad, named its new station there after civil engineer Thomas Telford.

=== Incorporation as a borough ===
The Borough of Telford was incorporated by decree of the Court of Quarter Sessions of Bucks County of November 10, 1886. A decade later, The Borough of West Telford was incorporated by decree of the Court of Quarter Sessions of Montgomery County of December 27, 1897. In 1934, the respective boroughs entered into an agreement for consolidation, and an election was held on this question on November 6, 1934. The voters of both boroughs approved the agreement, and on January 11, 1935, Governor Gifford Pinchot issued letters patent consolidating the two boroughs into the current Borough of Telford.

== Geography ==
Telford is located at 40°19′29″N 75°19′41″W (40.324786, -75.328045), elevation 449 feet (136.9 m).

According to the United States Census Bureau, the borough has a total area of 1.0 square mile (2.6 km^{2}), all land.

== Transportation ==
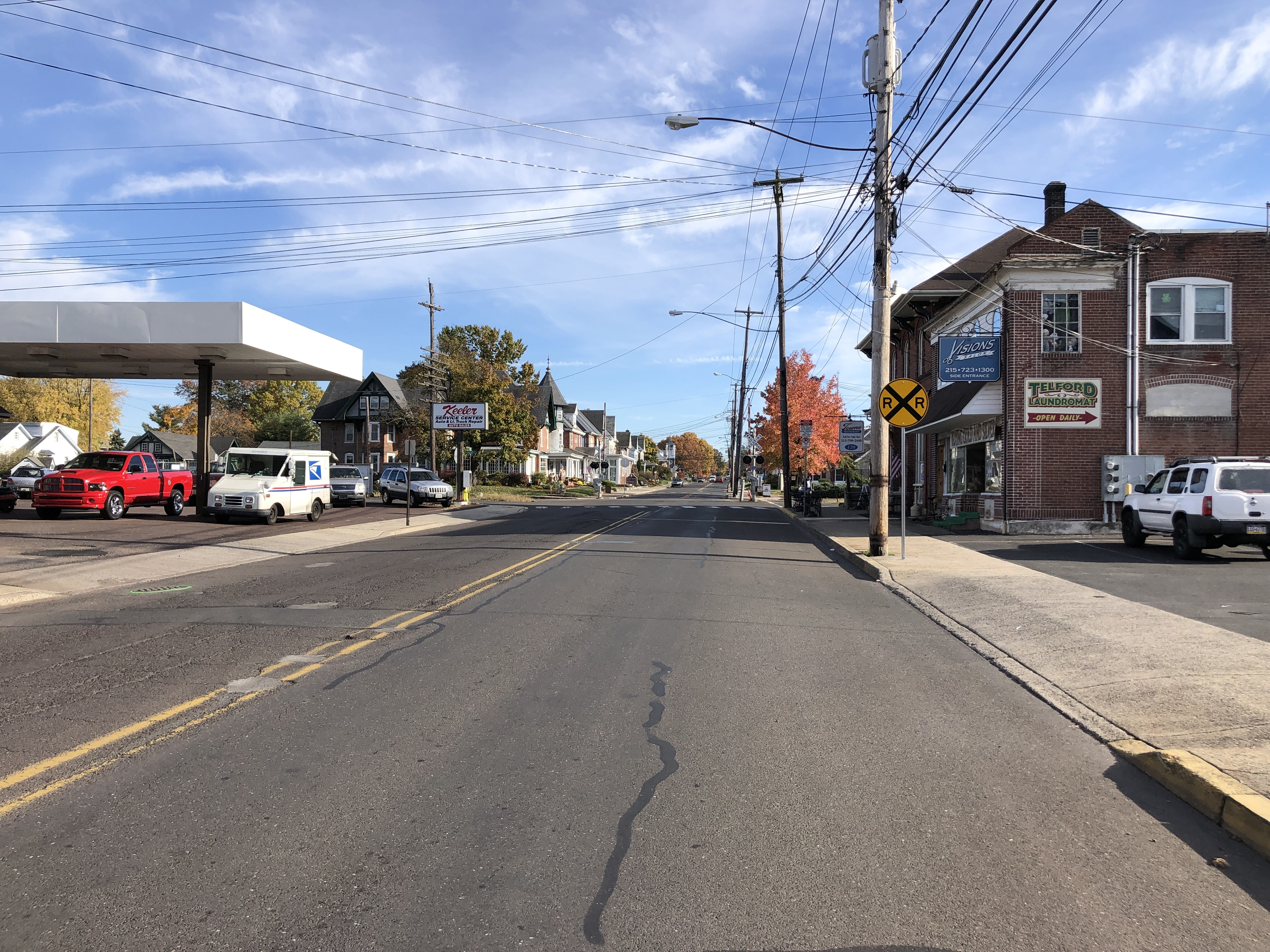
Main Street in Telford. The left side is in Bucks County while the right side is Montgomery County.

As of 2018 there were 13.94 miles (22.43 km) of public roads in Telford, of which 1.94 miles (3.12 km) were maintained by the Pennsylvania Department of Transportation (PennDOT) and 12.00 miles (19.31 km) were maintained by the borough.

No numbered highways serve Telford directly. Main thoroughfares traversing the town include Main Street and Church Road. State routes 309 and 563 are the closest state highways to Telford.

A rail line that was formerly the Reading Company's Bethlehem Branch runs north-south through Telford connecting to Perkasie, Quakertown, and Bethlehem to the north and Souderton, Hatfield, and Lansdale to the south. The line was used by the SEPTA Bethlehem Line until 1981. The tracks are still used for the transport of freight between Lansdale and Quakertown, and beyond. The line is used for occasional scenic rail trips, and resumption of passenger service to Quakertown is being considered. Telford is also the via point location for Pennsylvania Northeastern Railroad out of Lansdale and East Penn Railroad out of Quakertown. The Telford station is still standing, though remains vacant.

SEPTA Suburban Bus Route 132 starts in Telford and ends at the Montgomery Mall in Montgomeryville, serving Souderton, Hatfield, and Lansdale.

From 1901 to 1951, an interurban electric trolley line, Lehigh Valley Transit, known as the Liberty Bell Limited, ran from Telford north to Allentown (through Quakertown) and south (through Lansdale) to Philadelphia. During World War II, it carried a large number of passengers due to gas rationing, forcing a reduction in auto use, but after the war its business declined and in 1951, it abandoned rail and converted to bus operation.

== Demographics ==
Historical population
Census	Pop.	Note	%±
1890	125		—
1900	181		44.8%
1910	207		14.4%
1920	313		51.2%
1930	412		31.6%
1940	1,747		324.0%
1950	2,042		16.9%
1960	2,763		35.3%
1970	3,409		23.4%
1980	3,507		2.9%
1990	4,238		20.8%
2000	4,680		10.4%
2010	4,872		4.1%
2020	4,928		1.1%

=== 2020 census ===
As of the 2020 census, Telford had a population of 4,928. The median age was 42.9 years. 19.8% of residents were under the age of 18 and 21.9% were 65 years of age or older. For every 100 females, there were 89.1 males, and for every 100 females age 18 and over, there were 88.1 males.

100.0% of residents lived in urban areas, while 0.0% lived in rural areas.

There were 2,127 households in Telford, of which 26.9% had children under the age of 18 living in them. Of all households, 42.2% were married-couple households, 19.7% were households with a male householder and no spouse or partner present, and 31.4% were households with a female householder and no spouse or partner present. About 36.5% of all households were made up of individuals, and 20.6% had someone living alone who was 65 years of age or older.

There were 2,229 housing units, of which 4.6% were vacant. The homeowner vacancy rate was 0.6% and the rental vacancy rate was 5.3%.

Racial composition as of the 2020 census
Race	Number	Percent
White	3,816	77.4%
Black or African American	206	4.2%
American Indian and Alaska Native	27	0.5%
Asian	268	5.4%
Native Hawaiian and Other Pacific Islander	0	0.0%
Some other race	271	5.5%
Two or more races	340	6.9%
Hispanic or Latino (of any race)	554	11.2%

=== 2000 census ===
As of the census of 2000, 4,681 people, 1,930 households, and 1,200 families resided in the borough. The population density was 4,618.2 inhabitants per square mile (1,783.1/km^{2}). The 1,977 housing units averaged 1,950.9 per square mile (755.8/km^{2}). The racial makeup of the borough was 92.48% White, 1.30% Black, 0.02% Native American, 3.76% Asian, 0.02% Pacific Islander, 1.13% from other races, and 1.28% from two or more races. Hispanics or Latinos of any race were 3.61% of the population.

Of the 1,930 households, 29.4% had children under the age of 18 living with them, 51.1% were married couples living together, 8.2% had a female householder with no husband present, and 37.8% were not families. About 33.3% of all households were made up of individuals, and 17.4% had someone living alone who was 65 years of age or older. The average household size was 2.34 and the average family size was 3.00.

In the borough, the population was distributed as 23.0% under the age of 18, 6.6% from 18 to 24, 33.2% from 25 to 44, 19.2% from 45 to 64, and 18.0% who were 65 years of age or older. The median age was 37 years. For every 100 females, there were 88.2 males. For every 100 females age 18 and over, there were 84.5 males.

The median income for a household in the borough was $45,451, and for a family was $56,809. Males had a median income of $38,750 versus $28,387 for females. The per capita income for the borough was $22,075. About 2.5% of families and 4.7% of the population were below the poverty line, including 4.3% of those under age 18 and 5.3% of those age 65 or over.

=== Demographic estimates ===
In 2008, the median household income was estimated at $58,350 (it was $45,451 in 2000).

In 2008, the estimated house or condo value was $256,582 (compared to $130,300 in 2000). In 2008, the per capita income was $28,979.

== Politics and government ==
Presidential elections results
Year	Republican	Democratic
2020	50.6% 1,292	49.3% 1,260
2016	51.9% 1,148	43.2% 955
2012	53.5% 1,088	44.8% 911
2008	51.0% 1,094	47.8% 1,027

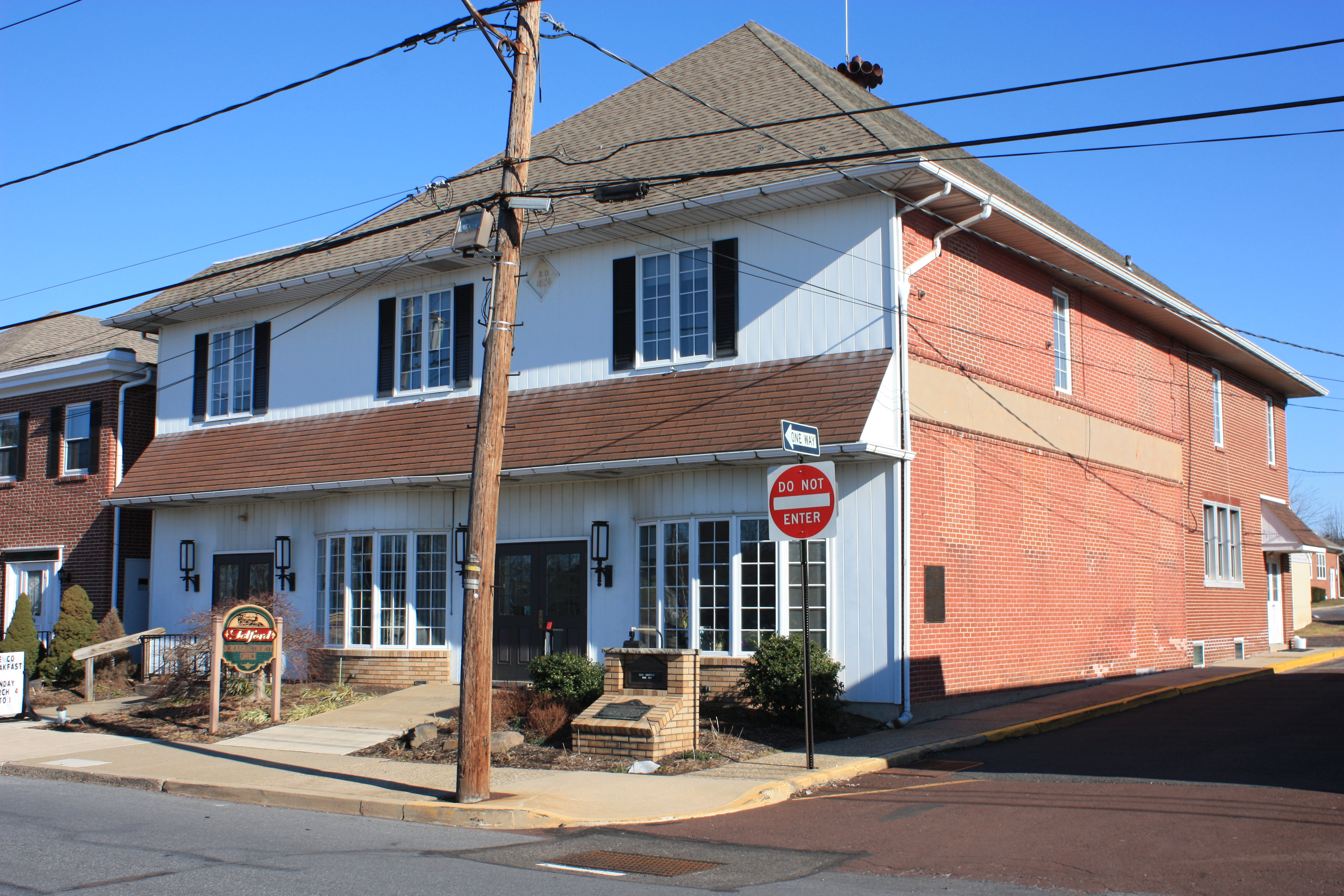
Telford Borough Hall

The borough is represented by the following officials:

=== U.S. House of Representatives ===
- Brian Fitzpatrick (R), Pennsylvania's 1st congressional district

=== Pennsylvania State Senate ===
- Steve Santarsiero (D), Pennsylvania Senate, District 10

=== Pennsylvania House of Representatives ===
- Steve Malagari (D), Pennsylvania House of Representatives, District 53

== Climate ==
According to the Köppen climate classification system, Telford has a Hot-summer, Humid continental climate (Dfa). Dfa climates are characterized by at least one month having an average mean temperature ≤ 32.0 °F (0.0 °C), at least four months with an average mean temperature ≥ 50.0 °F (10.0 °C), at least one month with an average mean temperature ≥ 71.6 °F (22.0 °C) and no significant precipitation difference between seasons. Although most summer days are slightly humid in Telford, episodes of heat and high humidity can occur with heat index values > 107 °F (42 °C). Since 1981, the highest air temperature was 101.5 °F (38.6 °C) on July 22, 2011, and the highest daily average mean dew point was 74.3 °F (23.5 °C) on August 12, 2016. The average wettest month is July, which corresponds with the annual peak in thunderstorm activity. Since 1981, the wettest calendar day was 6.70 inches (170 mm) on August 27, 2011. During the winter months, the average annual extreme minimum air temperature is −1.7 °F (−18.7 °C). Since 1981, the coldest air temperature was −12.3 °F (−24.6 °C) on January 21, 1994. Episodes of extreme cold and wind can occur, with wind chill values < −13 °F (−25 °C). The average annual snowfall (Nov-Apr) is between 30 inches (76 cm) and 36 inches (91 cm). Ice storms and large snowstorms depositing ≥ 12 inches (30 cm) of snow occur once every few years, particularly during nor’easters from December through February.

Climate data for Telford, Elevation 413 ft (126 m), 1981-2010 normals, extremes 1981-2018
Month	Jan	Feb	Mar	Apr	May	Jun	Jul	Aug	Sep	Oct	Nov	Dec	Year
Record high °F (°C)	70.7 (21.5)	78.1 (25.6)	86.1 (30.1)	92.9 (33.8)	94.5 (34.7)	95.8 (35.4)	101.7 (38.7)	99.7 (37.6)	97.2 (36.2)	88.4 (31.3)	80.4 (26.9)	76.0 (24.4)	101.7 (38.7)
Mean daily maximum °F (°C)	38.4 (3.6)	41.7 (5.4)	50.0 (10.0)	62.2 (16.8)	72.3 (22.4)	81.0 (27.2)	85.0 (29.4)	83.4 (28.6)	76.5 (24.7)	64.9 (18.3)	53.9 (12.2)	42.5 (5.8)	62.7 (17.1)
Daily mean °F (°C)	29.7 (−1.3)	32.5 (0.3)	40.1 (4.5)	50.9 (10.5)	60.7 (15.9)	69.8 (21.0)	74.3 (23.5)	72.7 (22.6)	65.3 (18.5)	53.6 (12.0)	43.9 (6.6)	34.0 (1.1)	52.4 (11.3)
Mean daily minimum °F (°C)	21.0 (−6.1)	23.2 (−4.9)	30.1 (−1.1)	39.7 (4.3)	49.1 (9.5)	58.7 (14.8)	63.6 (17.6)	62.0 (16.7)	54.1 (12.3)	42.2 (5.7)	33.9 (1.1)	25.5 (−3.6)	42.0 (5.6)
Record low °F (°C)	−12.3 (−24.6)	−4.9 (−20.5)	2.0 (−16.7)	16.8 (−8.4)	30.0 (−1.1)	40.4 (4.7)	47.1 (8.4)	41.7 (5.4)	34.4 (1.3)	23.1 (−4.9)	10.2 (−12.1)	−2.5 (−19.2)	−12.3 (−24.6)
Average precipitation inches (mm)	3.40 (86)	2.81 (71)	3.87 (98)	4.05 (103)	4.31 (109)	4.34 (110)	4.73 (120)	3.91 (99)	4.54 (115)	4.26 (108)	3.69 (94)	3.92 (100)	47.83 (1,215)
Average relative humidity (%)	67.9	64.3	60.2	59.0	63.4	68.6	68.8	71.4	72.4	71.2	69.9	69.9	67.3
Average dew point °F (°C)	20.4 (−6.4)	21.8 (−5.7)	27.4 (−2.6)	37.1 (2.8)	48.2 (9.0)	59.0 (15.0)	63.4 (17.4)	62.9 (17.2)	56.2 (13.4)	44.5 (6.9)	34.7 (1.5)	25.2 (−3.8)	41.8 (5.4)
Source: PRISM

== Ecology ==
According to the A. W. Kuchler U.S. potential natural vegetation types, Telford would have a dominant vegetation type of Appalachian Oak (104) with a dominant vegetation form of Eastern Hardwood Forest (25). The plant hardiness zone is 6b with an average annual extreme minimum air temperature of −1.7 °F (−18.7 °C). The spring bloom typically begins by April 13 and fall color usually peaks by October 27.

== Notable people ==
- Erik Kratz, former professional baseball catcher; was born in Telford in 1980.
- Alex McArthur, the lead actor in the "Desperado" TV series of films; was born in Telford in March 1957.
- Jim Herman, PGA Pro, resides in Telford, member of Indian Valley Country Club.
