= Perkasie Tunnel =

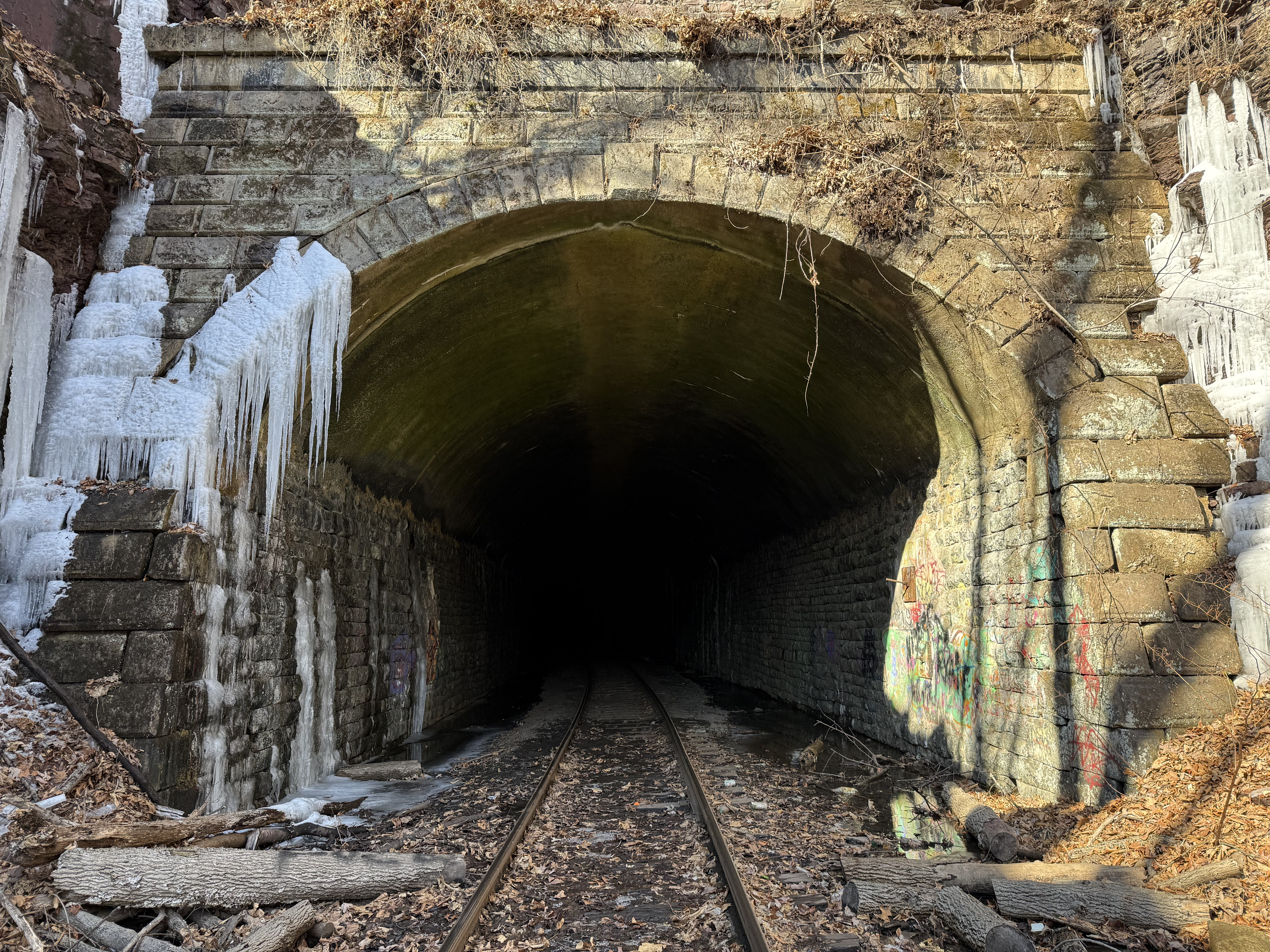
- South portal of the Perkasie Tunnel in February 2025
- Interactive map of Perkasie Tunnel

Overview
- Other name: Landis Ridge Tunnel
- Line: Bethlehem Branch
- Location: Bucks County, Pennsylvania, U.S.
- Coordinates: 40°22′49″N 75°17′37″W
- System: East Penn Railroad

Operation
- Work began: 1853
- Constructed: Rock and brick
- Opened: 1857
- Traffic: Rail
- Character: Freight

Technical
- Line length: 2,142 feet (653 m)
- No. of tracks: Single
- Track gauge: 1,435 mm (4 ft 8 1/2 in) standard gauge

The Perkasie Tunnel, also known as the Landis Ridge Tunnel, is a train tunnel in Bucks County, Pennsylvania on a line owned by SEPTA and operated by the East Penn Railroad. The southern portal of the tunnel is in Perkasie just southeast of the intersection of Ridge Road, Ridge Avenue and Tunnel Road, while the northern portal is near the southwest end of Pennridge Airport in East Rockhill Township. Northbound passenger trains going through the tunnel traveled to Union Station in Bethlehem and points beyond. Many southbound passenger trains were destined for Reading Terminal in Philadelphia. The Perkasie station on 8th Street was formerly equipped with a water tower, of which not a trace remains.

== Physical features ==
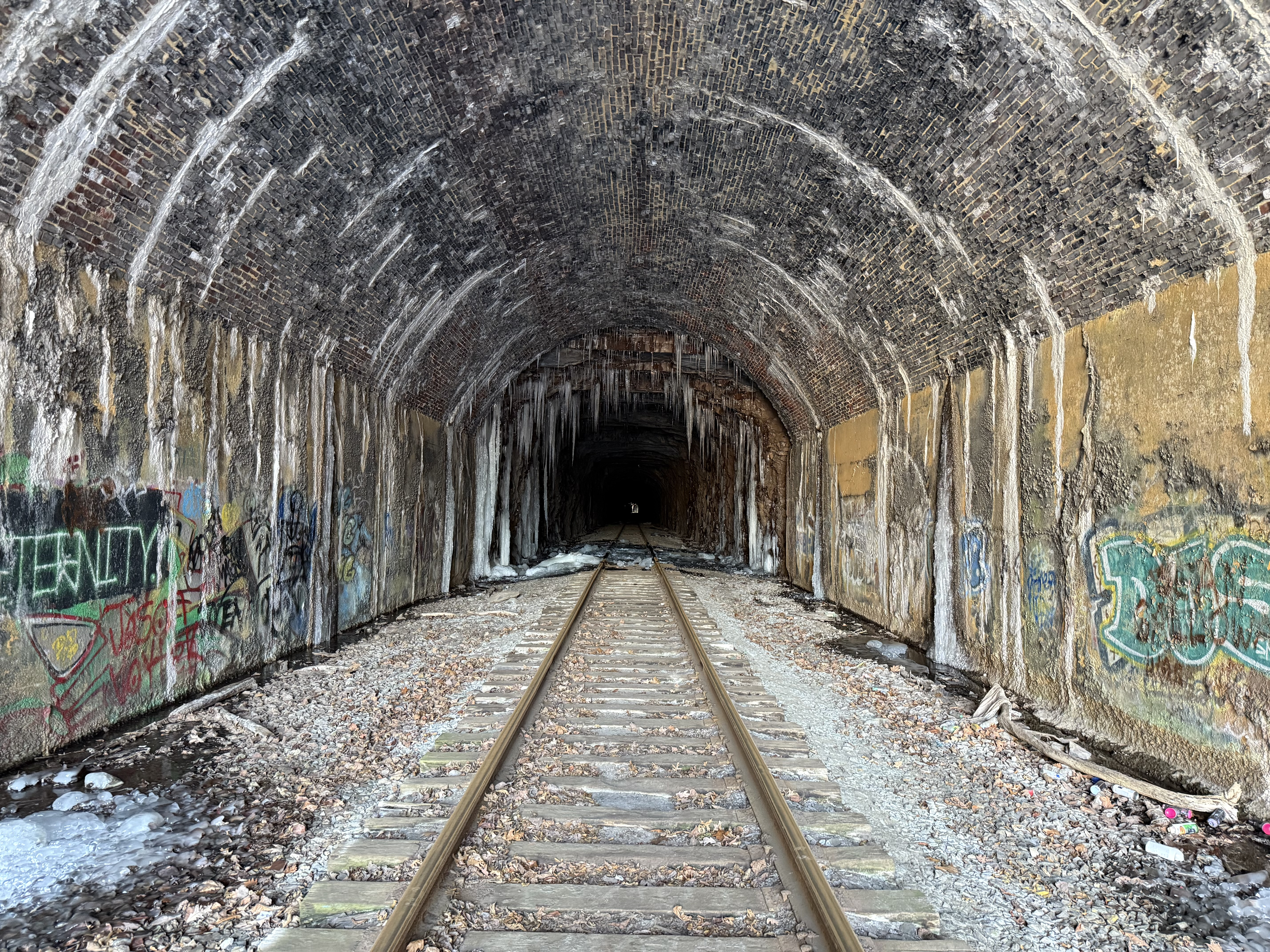
Interior of the tunnel, looking south from the north portal in February 2025

The tunnel is curved and the entrances are constructed in such a way that light entering the tunnel at the 8th Street entrance is visible from the opposite end of the tunnel near Ridge Road; this is apparently not the case in the opposite direction. The edges of the tunnel are jagged, allowing beautiful ice structures to form when water dripping from the top and sides freezes in winter.

Throughout random points along the tunnel water drips down through the ceiling. In the winter this creates large globs of ice that stick to the rails. After heavy rain towards the end of the tunnel water pours down into the tunnel through many pipes and cracks. About 3/4 of the way through the tunnel there is a large opening straight up. The top of it is covered by wooden planks, but the sky is still visible through the cracks. This gives just enough light to creat a spotlight effect on the rails.

The tunnel is lined with stone masonry at both entrances. The walls in the interior of the tunnel are unfinished, blasted stone. The tunnel bore remains cool enough in summer that track workers or trespassers require a light jacket or sweatshirt. Signage on the Perkasie Tunnel consists of graffiti and the occasional "No Trespassing" sign. Cell phone service is unavailable inside the tunnel.

At the exit of the tunnel, it is possible to get on top of the tunnel. This can be done by climbing the left side of the rocks after the exit. While there is a clear path to get up there, it is quite difficult and would only recommend attempting if you are in good physical condition. In addition the path is very steep and covered in mud. After rain it is nearly impossible to get up there even if you are athletic. If you are able to get on top, there is a path to walk back and reach the top of the tunnel. Theres space behind the concrete top which is about 34 feet tall.

== Trains ==
The last scheduled passenger train traveled though Perkasie on July 29, 1981, after which passenger service terminated as part of a broader SEPTA strategy of discontinuing all non-electrified passenger service. Conrail continued freight operations to Quakertown until Conrail's demise in 1999, at which point CSX took over operations and leased the line between Lansdale and Telford. The trains passing through the Perkasie tunnel currently stop in the town of Perkasie only when necessary to switch freight cars to the (otherwise unused) Southbound track for storage.

SEPTA discussed abandoning the tracks between Telford and Quakertown when financial incentives for continued CSX freight service declined below the break-even point for a Class-1 railroad. This portion of the Bethlehem Branch was saved from abandonment when short line railroad company East Penn Railway (EPRY) leased the portion between Telford and Quakertown in 1997 to continue operations under the name East Penn Railroad (ESPN). Depending on the workload, East Penn Railroad, operating out of Quakertown, runs trains on the Bethlehem Branch two to three times a week as well as the occasional weekend. SEPTA remains owner of the Bethlehem Branch from Lansdale to Hellertown. Norfolk Southern owns the section from Hellertown through Bethlehem. Operational track presently ends at California Road just above Quakertown because the East Penn Railroad had no use for it.

See North Pennsylvania Railroad for more Bethlehem Branch information.

SEPTA has also proposed the re-activation of train service to Quakertown, but SEPTA has not planned such a task.

== See also ==
- List of tunnels documented by the Historic American Engineering Record in Pennsylvania
