= Hatfield, Pennsylvania =

Borough in Pennsylvania, US

Borough of Hatfield
- Borough
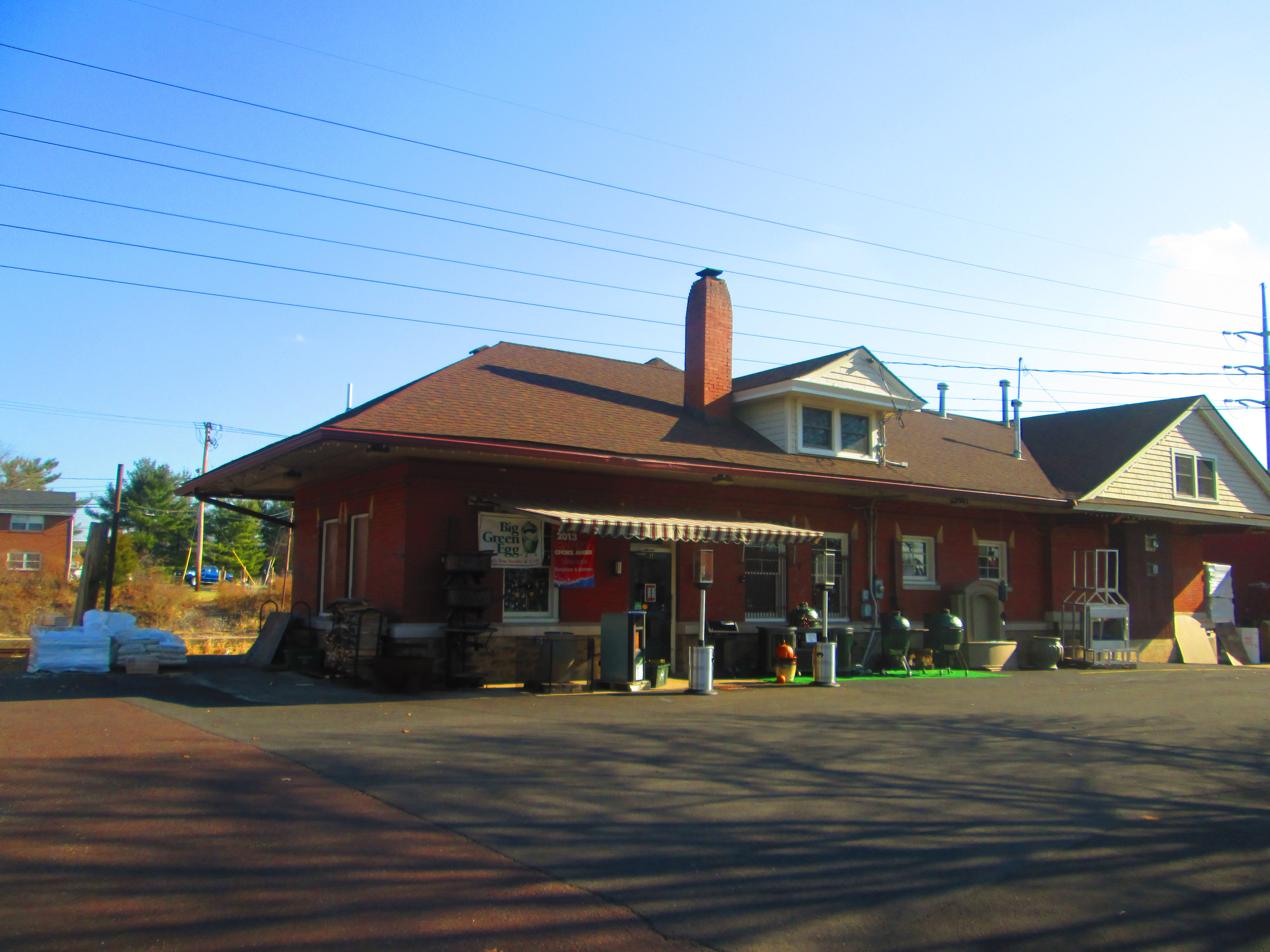
- Former Reading station

- Flag Seal

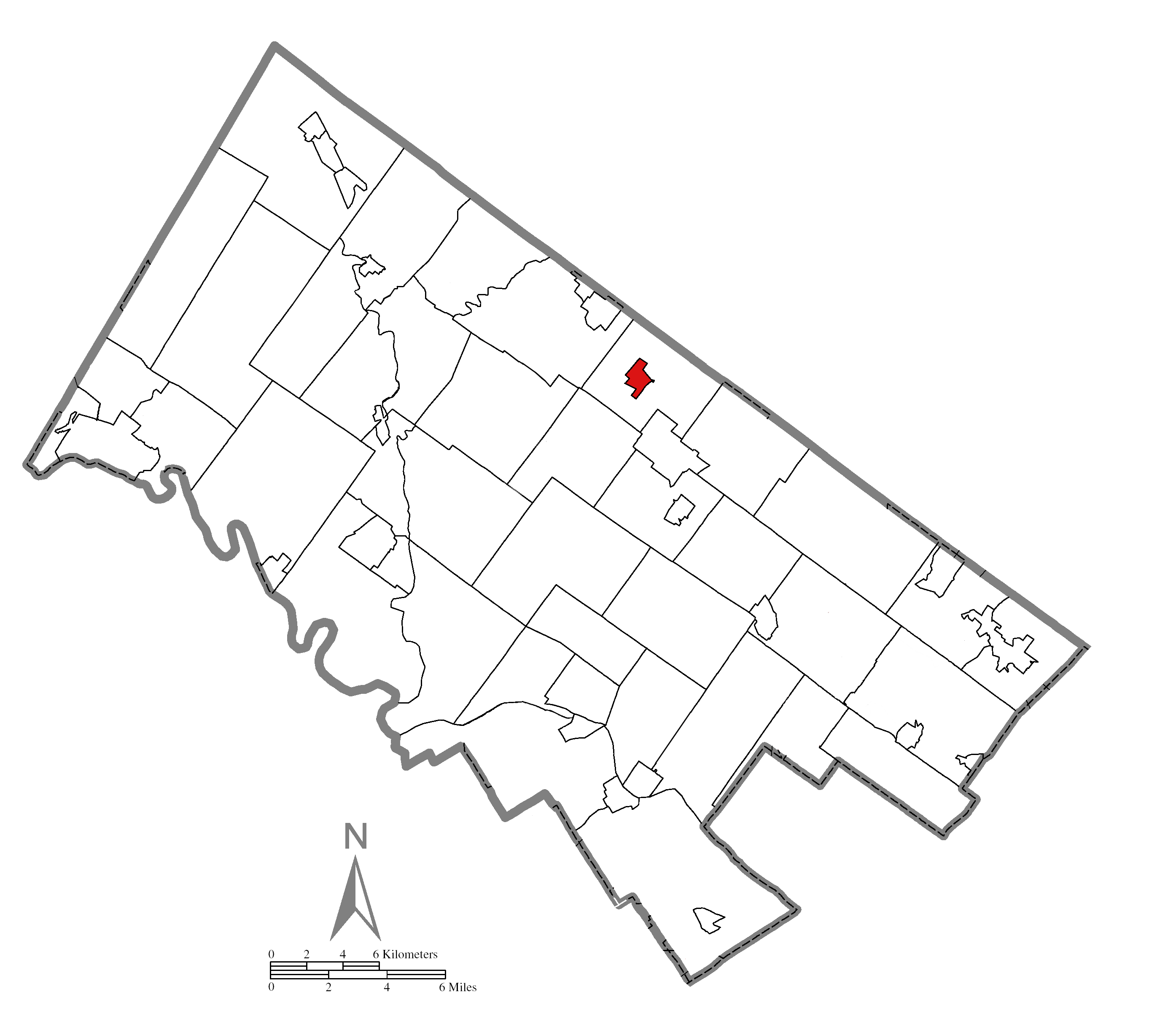
- Location of Hatfield in Montgomery County, Pennsylvania.

- Location of Hatfield in Pennsylvania Hatfield (the United States)
- Coordinates: 40°16′41″N 75°17′56″W
- Country: United States
- State: Pennsylvania
- County: Montgomery

Government
  - Type: Council-manager
  - Mayor: Mary Ann Girard

Area
  - Total: 0.64 sq mi (1.67 km^{2})
  - Land: 0.64 sq mi (1.67 km^{2})
  - Water: 0 sq mi (0.00 km^{2})
- Elevation: 335 ft (102 m)

Population (2020)
  - Total: 3,496
  - Density: 5,435.9/sq mi (2,098.83/km^{2})
- Time zone: UTC-5 (EST)
  - Summer (DST): UTC-4 (EDT)
- ZIP Code: 19440
- Area codes: 215, 267, and 445
- FIPS code: 42-33112
- Website: www.hatfieldborough.com

Hatfield is a borough in Montgomery County, Pennsylvania, United States. As of the 2020 census, Hatfield had a population of 3,496. It is part of the North Penn Valley region that is centered around the borough of Lansdale. The borough is surrounded by Hatfield Township .

== Geography ==
According to the U.S. Census Bureau, the borough has a total area of 0.6 square miles (1.6 km^{2}), all land.

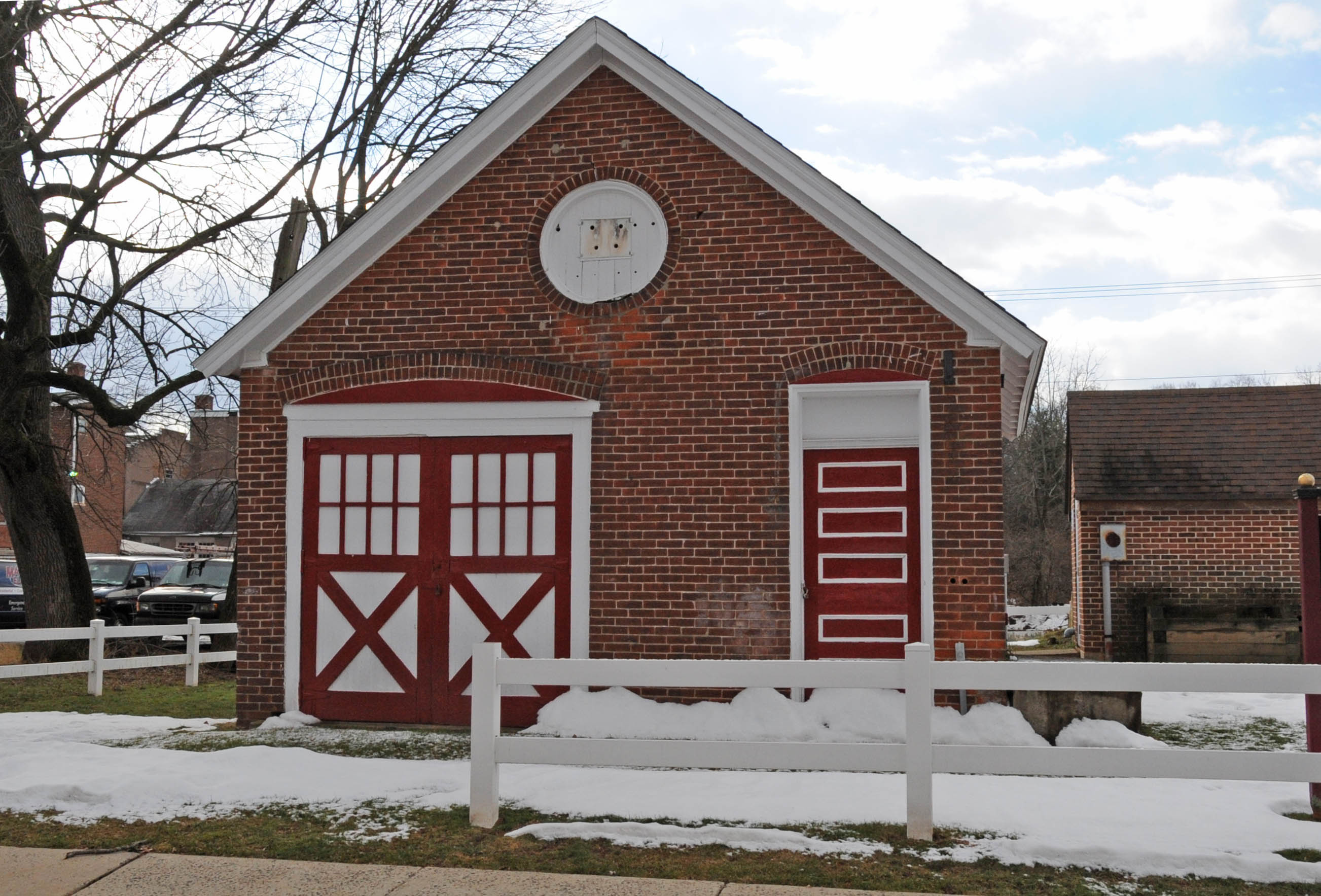
Former electrical substation, jailhouse and firehouse

== Demographics ==
Historical population
Census	Pop.	Note	%±
1900	528		—
1910	705		33.5%
1920	830		17.7%
1930	1,149		38.4%
1940	1,301		13.2%
1950	1,624		24.8%
1960	1,941		19.5%
1970	2,385		22.9%
1980	2,533		6.2%
1990	2,650		4.6%
2000	2,605		−1.7%
2010	3,290		26.3%
2020	3,496		6.3%

=== 2020 census ===
As of the 2020 census, Hatfield had a population of 3,496. The median age was 39.2 years. 22.4% of residents were under the age of 18 and 14.8% of residents were 65 years of age or older. For every 100 females there were 105.9 males, and for every 100 females age 18 and over there were 105.7 males age 18 and over.

100.0% of residents lived in urban areas, while 0.0% lived in rural areas.

There were 1,311 households in Hatfield, of which 35.0% had children under the age of 18 living in them. Of all households, 50.9% were married-couple households, 20.7% were households with a male householder and no spouse or partner present, and 22.2% were households with a female householder and no spouse or partner present. About 27.2% of all households were made up of individuals and 8.9% had someone living alone who was 65 years of age or older.

There were 1,377 housing units, of which 4.8% were vacant. The homeowner vacancy rate was 1.3% and the rental vacancy rate was 6.6%.

Racial composition as of the 2020 census
Race	Number	Percent
White	1,976	56.5%
Black or African American	215	6.1%
American Indian and Alaska Native	22	0.6%
Asian	855	24.5%
Native Hawaiian and Other Pacific Islander	1	0.0%
Some other race	224	6.4%
Two or more races	203	5.8%
Hispanic or Latino (of any race)	343	9.8%

=== 2010 census ===
As of the 2010 census, the borough was 66.6% White, 4.1% Black or African American, 0.1% Native American, 23.5% Asian, and 2.9% were two or more races. 6.8% of the population were of Hispanic or Latino ancestry

=== 2000 census ===
As of the census of 2000, there were 2,605 people, 1,106 households, and 650 families residing in the borough. The population density was 4,102.7 inhabitants per square mile (1,584.1/km^{2}). There were 1,139 housing units at an average density of 1,793.9 per square mile (692.6/km^{2}). The racial makeup of the borough was 82.19% White, 1.77% African American, 0.31% Native American, 12.05% Asian, 0.04% Pacific Islander, 1.42% from other races, and 2.23% from two or more races. Hispanic or Latino of any race were 3.34% of the population.

There were 1,106 households, out of which 30.5% had children under the age of 18 living with them, 46.5% were married couples living together, 8.8% had a female householder with no husband present, and 41.2% were non-families. 35.0% of all households were made up of individuals, and 7.8% had someone living alone who was 65 years of age or older. The average household size was 2.31 and the average family size was 3.03.

In the borough, the population was distributed by age as follows: 23.2% under the age of 18, 8.2% from 18 to 24, 37.1% from 25 to 44, 19.9% from 45 to 64, and 11.7% who were 65 years of age or older. The median age was 35 years. For every 100 females there were 95.6 males. For every 100 females age 18 and over, there were 92.0 males.

The median income for a household in the borough was $45,975, and the median income for a family was $52,743. Males had a median income of $38,939 versus $30,775 for females. The per capita income for the borough was $21,133. About 4.2% of families and 5.5% of the population were below the poverty line, including 6.5% of those under age 18 and 8.1% of those age 65 or over.

== Government ==
Presidential elections results
Year	Republican	Democratic
2020	40.8% 701	58.0% 997
2016	36.7% 515	58.6% 822
2012	39.4% 500	58.6% 743
2008	37.7% 493	60.6% 793
2004	47.7% 595	51.6% 643
2000	51.8% 439	43.8% 371

Hatfield has a city manager form of government with a mayor and a five-member borough council. The mayor is Mary Anne Girard.

The borough is part of the United States House of Representatives Pennsylvania District 1 (represented by Rep. Brian Fitzpatrick). Pennsylvania's 53rd Representative District (represented by Rep. Steve Malagari) and the 12th State Senate District (represented by Sen. Maria Collett).

== Education ==
Hatfield is in the North Penn School District. Hatfield Elementary School is in Hatfield Township.

St. Maria Goretti School in Hatfield closed in 2012 but the church is still open.

== Economy ==
Penn Beer has a sales and service center located in the former Cemco Lift plant (closed in 2012 by Otis Elevator Company).

== Infrastructure ==
=== Transportation ===
==== Roads ====
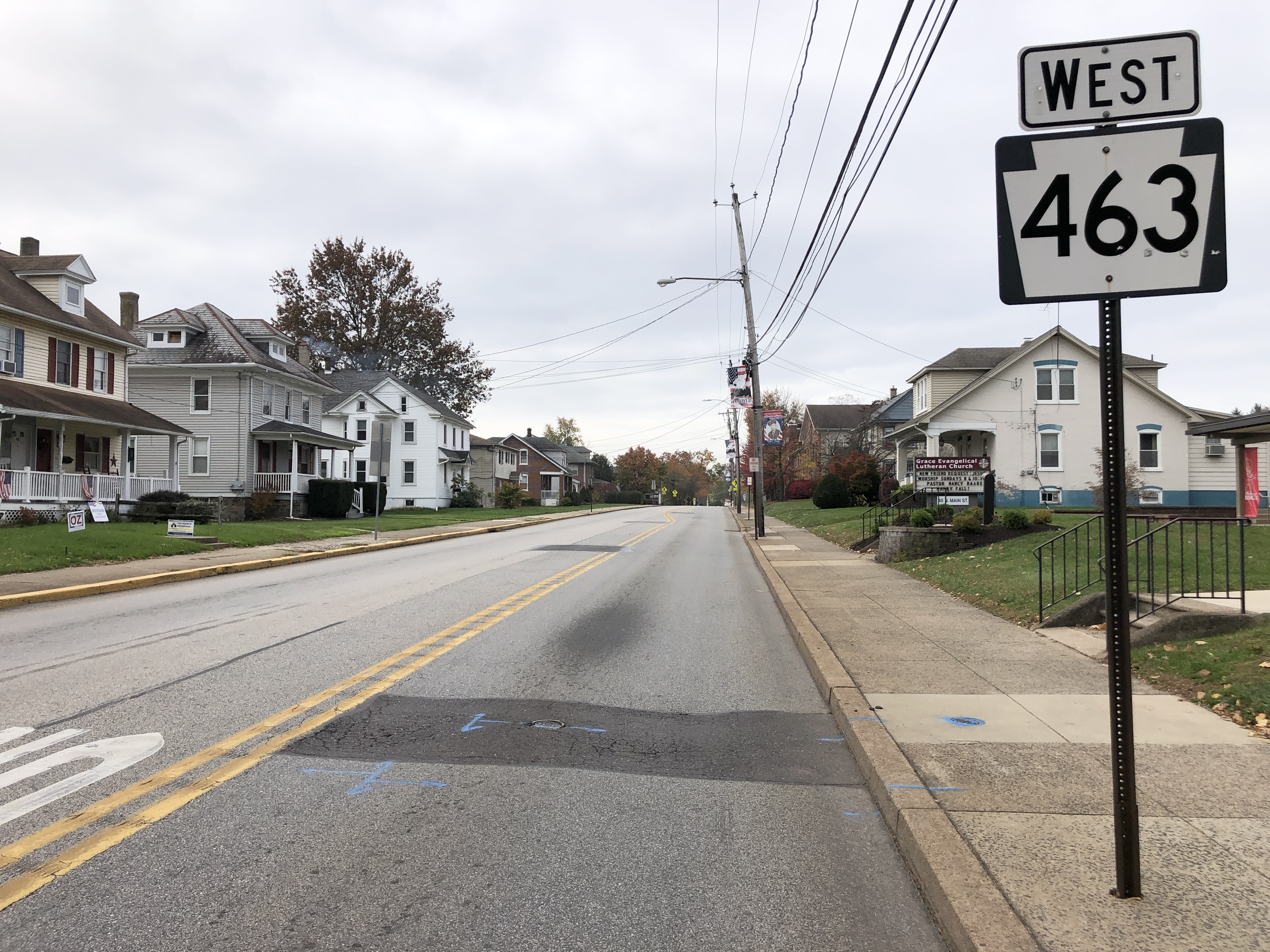
PA 463 westbound in Hatfield

As of 2006 there were 8.80 miles (14.16 km) of public roads in Hatfield, of which 1.68 miles (2.70 km) were maintained by the Pennsylvania Department of Transportation (PennDOT) and 7.12 miles (11.46 km) were maintained by the borough.

The main roads in Hatfield are Broad Street, which runs southwest–northeast and becomes Forty Foot Road to the southwest and by way of Market Street and Union Street leads to Unionville Pike to the northeast, and Main Street, which runs northwest–southeast and becomes Cowpath Road outside the borough limits. Pennsylvania Route 463 passes through Hatfield, entering from the southwest along Broad Street and leaving to the southeast along Main Street. Pennsylvania Route 309 passes to the northeast of Hatfield, with connections to the borough via PA 463 and Unionville Pike. The Lansdale interchange of the Pennsylvania Turnpike Northeast Extension (Interstate 476) is located southwest of Hatfield, with connections to the borough via Forty Foot Road (Pennsylvania Route 63 and PA 463).

==== Public transportation ====
Historically, a rail line which was formerly Reading Company's Bethlehem Branch runs north–south through Hatfield connecting to Souderton, Perkasie, Quakertown, and Bethlehem to the north and Lansdale to the south. The line was used by the SEPTA Bethlehem Line until 1981. The tracks are still used for the transport of freight between Lansdale and Quakertown, and beyond, with the Pennsylvania Northeastern Railroad providing freight service through Hatfield. The line is used for occasional scenic rail trips, and resumption of passenger service to Quakertown is being considered.

SEPTA Suburban Bus Route 132 serves Hatfield, heading north to Souderton and Telford and south to Lansdale and the Montgomery Mall in Montgomeryville.

=== Utilities ===
The Borough of Hatfield Electric Utility provides electricity to the borough. Natural gas in Hatfield is provided by PECO Energy Company, a subsidiary of Exelon. The North Penn Water Authority provides water to Hatfield and surrounding areas in the North Penn Valley. The Borough of Hatfield Sewer Utility provides sewer service to the borough. Trash and recycling collection in Hatfield is provided by private haulers including Republic Services, Waste Management, JP Mascaro & Sons, and Advanced Disposal.

== Notable people ==
- Brandon McManus, professional football player, Green Bay Packers
- Jim Molinaro, former professional football player, Washington Redskins
- Nancy Raabe, Lutheran composer, author, and clergy
- Ian Jones-Quartey, animator
