= Bethlehem Line =

Former SEPTA Regional Rail service

Overview
- Service type: Commuter rail
- Status: Discontinued
- Last service: July 26, 1981
- Former operators: Conrail; SEPTA

Route
- Termini: Reading Terminal, Philadelphia, U.S. Bethlehem Union Station, Bethlehem, Pennsylvania, U.S.
- Line used: Bethlehem Branch

The Bethlehem Line was a SEPTA Regional Rail service on the former Reading Company Bethlehem Branch between Lansdale and Bethlehem. Some trains continued over the electrified Lansdale/Doylestown Line to the Reading Terminal in Philadelphia.

Between 1978 and 1979, SEPTA extended service to Allentown. Service ended altogether in 1981 as SEPTA eliminated its former Reading diesel services. The Bethlehem Line is owned by SEPTA and is utilized for freight service by the Pennsylvania Northeastern Railroad between Lansdale and Telford and the East Penn Railroad between Telford and Quakertown.

The Quakertown–Bethlehem section has been dormant since the early 1990s: several portions of the rail bed currently serve as interim rail trails. It is not officially abandoned.

As of the 2020s, advocates are pushing for the return of rail service to Quakertown on the Bethlehem Branch.

== History ==
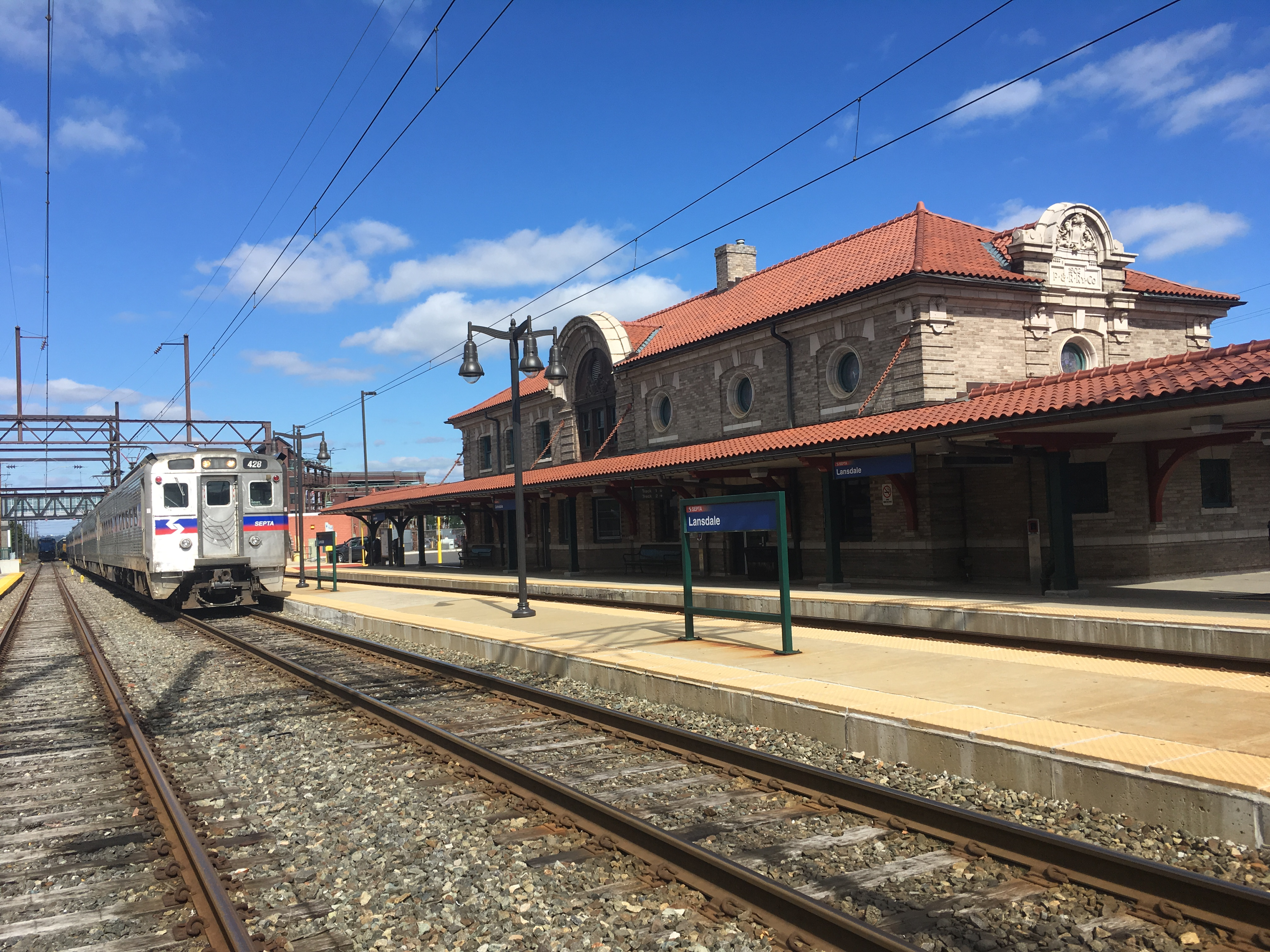
Lansdale station on the Bethlehem Line was a transfer point between electric trains to the south and diesel trains to the north

The route between Philadelphia and Bethlehem was constructed in the 19th century by the North Pennsylvania Railroad, a forerunner of the Reading Company. The Reading continued to operate passenger services between the two cities into the 20th century; at one time Bethlehem was a major interchange with the Lehigh Valley Railroad and the Central Railroad of New Jersey. Commuter services survived into the Conrail era but fell victim to SEPTA's decision in 1981 to eliminate diesel services. Service between Bethlehem and Quakertown ended on July 1, 1981; service between Quakertown and Lansdale ended on July 26.

== Stations ==
Bethlehem trains made the following station stops; stations indicated with italics closed prior to the discontinuation of service in 1981. Mileage and fare zones are from the July 30, 1978 timetable.

Zone	Distance	Station	City/Township	County
1	0 mi (0.0 km)	Reading Terminal	Philadelphia	
1A	0.8 mi (1.3 km)	Spring Garden Street	Philadelphia	
1A	1.8 mi (2.9 km)	Temple University	Philadelphia	
1A	2.9 mi (4.7 km)	North Broad Street	Philadelphia	
1A	4.0 mi (6.4 km)	Tioga	Philadelphia	
1A	4.3 mi (6.9 km)	Nicetown	Philadelphia	
1A	5.1 mi (8.2 km)	Wayne Junction	Philadelphia	
2	5.9 mi (9.5 km)	Logan	Philadelphia	
2	6.7 mi (10.8 km)	Tabor	Philadelphia	
2	7.3 mi (11.7 km)	Fern Rock	Philadelphia	
2E	8.4 mi (13.5 km)	Melrose Park	Cheltenham	Montgomery
2E	9.2 mi (14.8 km)	Elkins Park	Cheltenham	Montgomery
2J	10.8 mi (17.4 km)	Jenkintown	Cheltenham	Montgomery
2J	11.9 mi (19.2 km)	Glenside	Cheltenham	Montgomery
3	13.0 mi (20.9 km)	North Hills	Abington	Montgomery
3	13.9 mi (22.4 km)	Oreland	Springfield	Montgomery
3	14.8 mi (23.8 km)	Fellwick	Whitemarsh	Montgomery
4	15.9 mi (25.6 km)	Fort Washington	Whitemarsh	Montgomery
4	17.3 mi (27.8 km)	Ambler	Ambler	Montgomery
4	18.8 mi (30.3 km)	Penllyn	Lower Gwynedd	Montgomery
4	20.0 mi (32.2 km)	Gwynedd Valley	Lower Gwynedd	Montgomery
5	22.4 mi (36.0 km)	North Wales	North Wales	Montgomery
5	23.5 mi (37.8 km)	Pennbrook	Lansdale	Montgomery
5	24.4 mi (39.3 km)	Lansdale	Lansdale	Montgomery
6	27.1 mi (43.6 km)	Hatfield	Hatfield	Montgomery
6	29.6 mi (47.6 km)	Souderton	Souderton	Montgomery
7	30.9 mi (49.7 km)	Telford	Telford	Montgomery
7	33.6 mi (54.1 km)	Sellersville	Sellersville	Bucks
7	35.0 mi (56.3 km)	Perkasie	Perkasie	Bucks
8	40.2 mi (64.7 km)	Quakertown	Quakertown	Bucks
10	47.6 mi (76.6 km)	Centre Valley	Coopersburg	Lehigh
11	52.6 mi (84.7 km)	Hellertown	Hellertown	Northampton
11	56.6 mi (91.1 km)	Bethlehem	Bethlehem	Northampton
12	61.3 mi (98.7 km)	Allentown	Allentown	Lehigh
