= Bert Daikeler =

American politician

Bert C. Daikeler

Member of the Pennsylvania House of Representatives from the 53rd district
- In office 1981–1982
- Preceded by: Roosevelt Polite
- Succeeded by: Robert Godshall

Personal details
- Born: February 23, 1928 Brooklyn, New York, United States
- Died: January 7, 2012 (aged 83) Doylestown, Pennsylvania, United States
- Party: Republican

Bert C. Daikeler (February 23, 1928 – January 7, 2012) was a Republican member of the Pennsylvania House of Representatives.
