= Pennsylvania House of Representatives, District 53 =

American legislative district

Pennsylvania's 53rd State House of Representatives district
Representative
Steve Malagari; D–Lansdale
- Population (2022): 64,733

The 53rd Pennsylvania House of Representatives District is located in southeast Pennsylvania and has been represented by Steve Malagari since 2019.

== District profile ==
The 53rd District is located in Montgomery County and includes the following areas:

- Franconia Township (part)
  - Precinct 02
  - Precinct 05
  - Precinct 08
- Hatfield
- Hatfield Township
- Lansdale
- Montgomery Township (part)
  - District 01
  - District 02
  - District 03
- Souderton
- Telford (Montgomery County portion)

== Representatives ==
Representative	Party	Years	District home	Note
Prior to 1969, seats were apportioned by county.
Donald M. Davis	Democrat	1969 – 1972		Subsequently, represented the 50th district
District moved from Fayette and/or Greene County to Montgomery County after 1972
Roosevelt I. Polite	Republican	1973 – 1980		
Bert C. Daikeler	Republican	1981 – 1982		
Robert Godshall	Republican	1983 – 2019	Souderton	
Steve Malagari	Democrat	2019 – present	Lansdale	Incumbent

== Recent election results ==
PA House election, 2024: Pennsylvania House, District 53
Party	Candidate	Votes	%
Democratic	Steve Malagari (incumbent)	21,057	60.22
Republican	Cheryl Bonavita	13,912	39.78
Total votes		34,969	100.00
Democratic hold			

PA House election, 2022: Pennsylvania House, District 53
Party	Candidate	Votes	%
Democratic	Steve Malagari (incumbent)	16,578	61.09
Republican	Jennifer Sodha	10,560	38.91
Total votes		27,138	100.00
Democratic hold			

PA House election, 2020: Pennsylvania House, District 53
Party	Candidate	Votes	%
Democratic	Steve Malagari (incumbent)	19,974	54.70
Republican	Allan Arnott	16,543	45.30
Total votes		36,517	100.00
Democratic hold			

PA House election, 2018: Pennsylvania House, District 53
Party	Candidate	Votes	%
Democratic	Steve Malagari	13,632	51.06
Republican	George Szekely II	12,775	47.85
Libertarian	John Waldenberger	290	1.09
Total votes		26,697	100.00
Democratic gain from Republican			

PA House election, 2016: Pennsylvania House, District 53
Party	Candidate	Votes	%
Republican	Robert Godshall (incumbent)	17,964	59.54
Democratic	Leon Angelichio	12,205	40.46
Total votes		30,169	100.00
Republican hold			
