= Roosevelt Polite =

American politician

Roosevelt I. Polite

Member of the Pennsylvania House of Representatives from the 53rd district
- In office January 2, 1973 – November 30, 1980
- Preceded by: Donald Davis
- Succeeded by: Bert Daikeler

Personal details
- Born: September 3, 1912
- Died: March 14, 1981 (aged 68) Hatfield Township, Pennsylvania
- Party: Republican
- Education: Malvern Preparatory School, Class of 1933

Roosevelt I. Polite (September 3, 1912 – March 14, 1981) was a Republican member of the Pennsylvania House of Representatives.
