= Donald M. Davis =

American politician (1915–1976)

Member of the Pennsylvania House of Representatives from the 50th district
- In office January 2, 1973 – May 10, 1976
- Preceded by: Ben Parker
- Succeeded by: William DeWeese

Member of the Pennsylvania House of Representatives from the 53rd district
- In office January 7, 1969 – November 30, 1972
- Preceded by: District created
- Succeeded by: Roosevelt Polite

Personal details
- Born: June 5, 1915 Fairchance, Pennsylvania
- Died: October 23, 1976 (aged 61)
- Party: Democratic

Donald M. Davis (June 5, 1915 – October 23, 1976) is a former Democratic member of the Pennsylvania House of Representatives.
