= Saucon Rail Trail =

Rail trail in the Lehigh Valley, Pennsylvania, U.S.

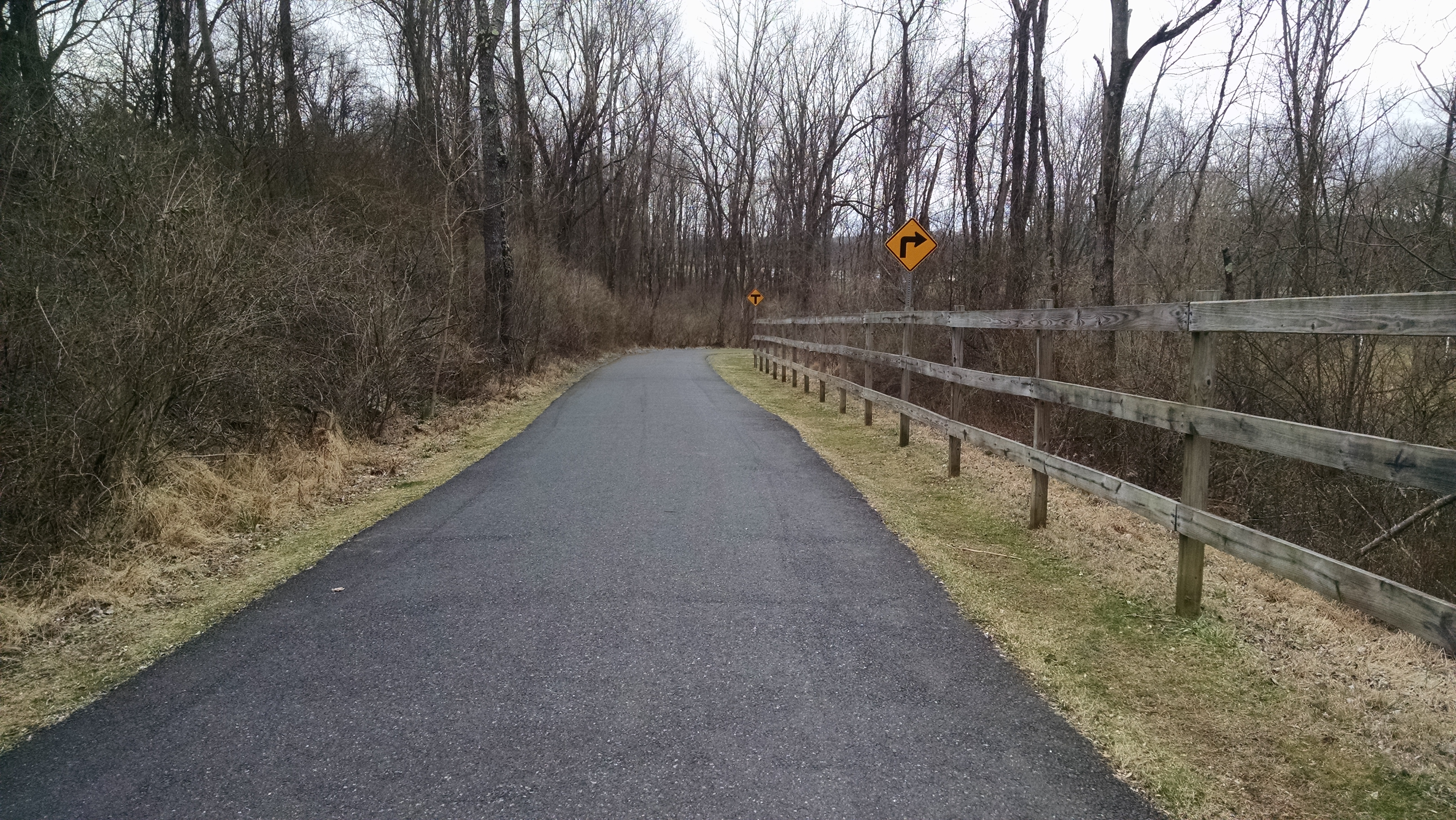
A paved portion of Saucon Rail Trail in Upper Saucon Township

Saucon Rail Trail is a converted railroad track of the SEPTA Bethlehem Line that runs through Upper Saucon Township and Lower Saucon Township in the Lehigh Valley region of eastern Pennsylvania. The trail is 7.5 miles long and is mostly flat with few hills. It is open during all seasons. The surface of the trail is covered in gravel and crushed rock with some parts covered in pavement.

The trail is used for walking, running, and biking, and is wheelchair accessible.

The Saucon Rail Trail starts and ends in two different parks. One endpoint is located in Water Street Park in Hellertown. The other endpoint is located in Southern Lehigh Living Memorial Park in Upper Saucon Township. The endpoints of the trail both have parking available with close access to the trail. There are also eight total access points for getting onto the Saucon Rail Trail with only a select few that have parking lots.

== History ==
=== 19th century ===
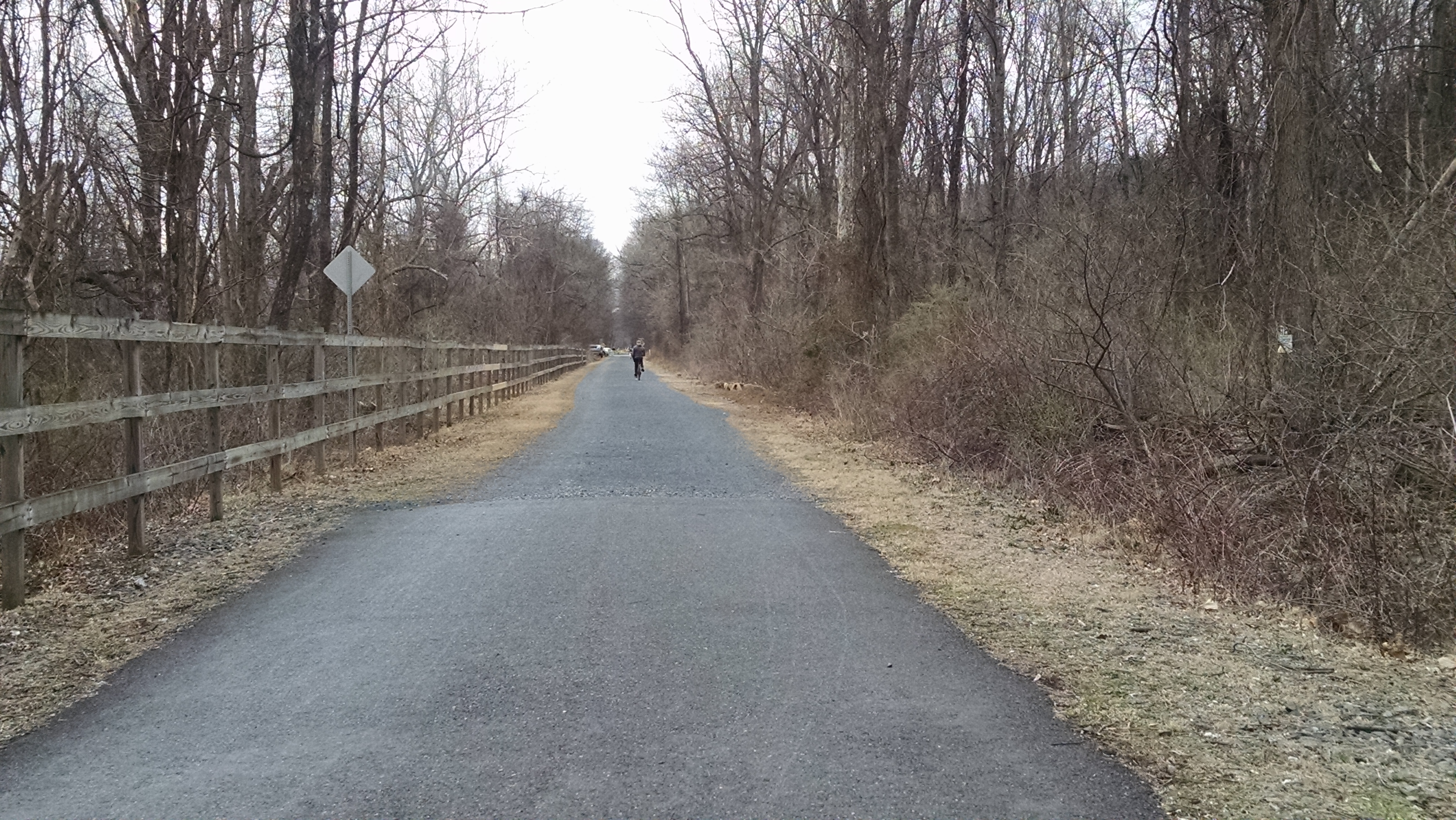
Saucon Rail Trail near Upper Saucon Township Community Park

Saucon Rail Trail was originally part of the North Pennsylvania Railroad. The railroad used to serve the four municipalities, Coopersburg, Hellertown, Lower Saucon Township, and Upper Saucon Township through which the trail currently runs. The railroad supported local industries such as anthracite coal, farming, commuter transportation, iron ore, mail services, dry goods/groceries and grains.

The railroad began construction on July 2, 1855, in Philadelphia.

=== 20th century ===
On July 26, 1981, SEPTA commuter lines were terminated to Bethlehem after 124 years of service. Conrail ceased freight service in 1984.

=== 21st century ===
In 2008, SEPTA issued a $2 million contract to remove the rails and ties from the railroad. The first phase of the rail trail opened in 2011 between Hellertown and Upper Saucon Township.
