= Robert Godshall =

American politician (1933–2019)

Robert W. Godshall

Member of the Pennsylvania House of Representatives from the 53rd district
- In office January 4, 1983 – January 1, 2019
- Preceded by: Bert C. Daikeler
- Succeeded by: Steve Malagari

Personal details
- Born: May 15, 1933 Souderton, Pennsylvania, U.S.
- Died: November 24, 2019 (aged 86) Sellersville, Pennsylvania, U.S.
- Party: Republican
- Education: University of Pennsylvania; Juniata College

Robert W. Godshall (May 15, 1933 – November 24, 2019) was a Republican member of the Pennsylvania House of Representatives for the 53rd District and was elected in 1982.

== Career ==
In 1979, Godshall was elected Montgomery County Controller and served in that position until he was elected to the House in 1982.

For the 2009-10 legislative session, Godshall served on the House Insurance and Rules Committees and was Republican chairman of the House Consumer Affairs Committee.

He served on the board of trustees of the National Constitution Center in Philadelphia, which is a museum dedicated to the U.S. Constitution.

== Personal ==
Godshall was a graduate of Souderton High School. He graduated from Juniata College and attended but did not graduate from the University of Pennsylvania Wharton School of Business. Godshall served on the Souderton Area School Board from 1963 to 1980. Godshall died at Grand View Hospital in Sellersville, Pennsylvania, on November 24, 2019, at the age of 86.
