= Pennsylvania Northeastern Railroad =

Shortline railroad in southeastern Pennsylvania

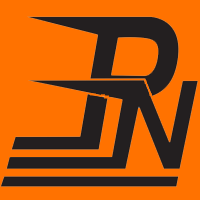

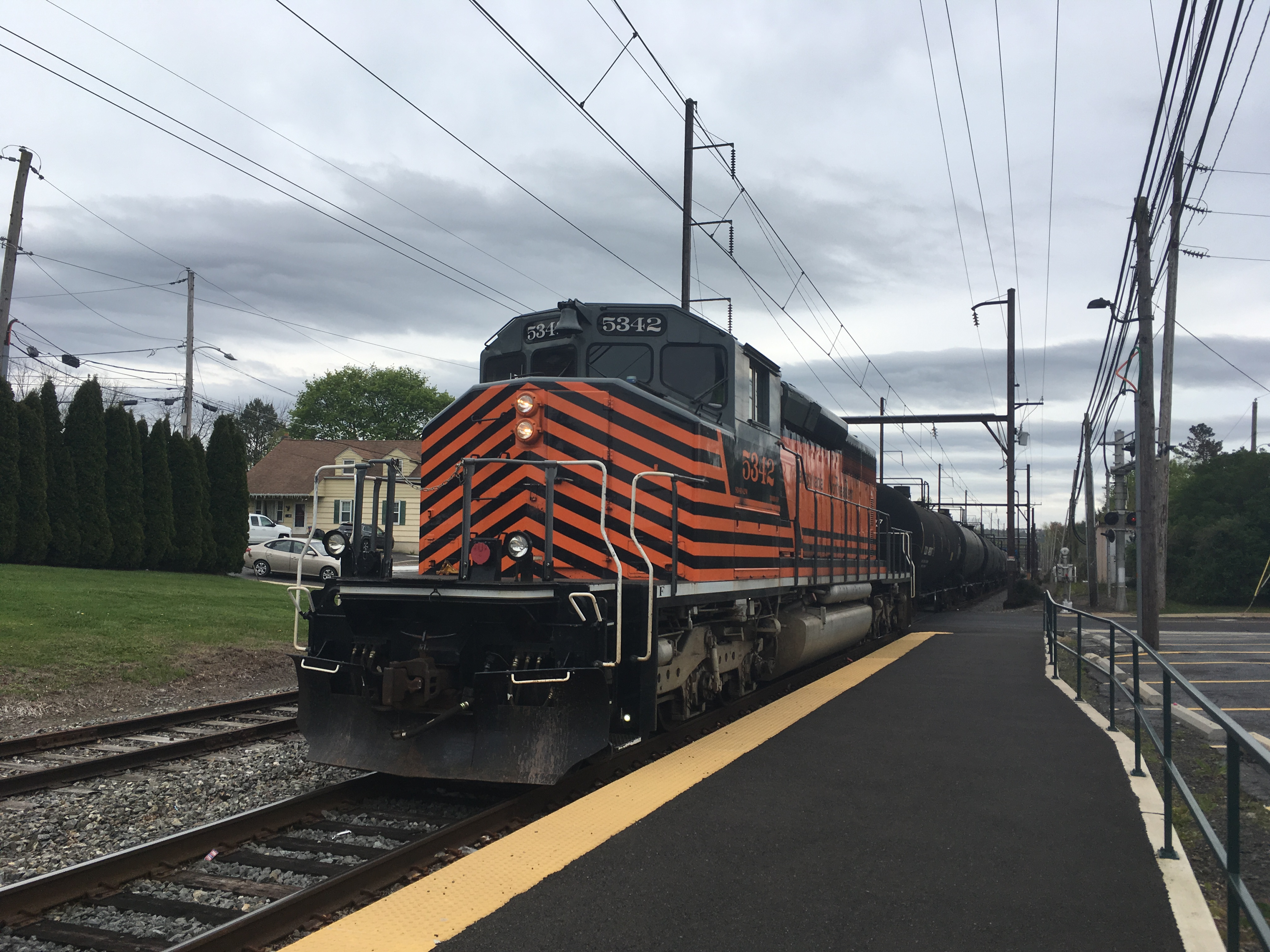
- PN 5342 along SEPTA's Warminster Line in Hatboro

Overview
- Headquarters: Lansdale, Pennsylvania
- Reporting mark: PN
- Locale: Southeastern Pennsylvania
- Dates of operation: 2011–present

Technical
- Track gauge: 4 ft 8 1/2 in (1,435 mm) standard gauge
- Length: 55.53 miles

Other
- Website: http://www.PNrailroad.com/

The Pennsylvania Northeastern Railroad (reporting mark PN) is a short-line railroad operating on trackage mostly in Bucks and Montgomery counties to the north of Philadelphia, Pennsylvania. It was created in 2011, taking over former operations from CSX Transportation. The Pennsylvania Northeastern Railroad interchanges with CSX in Lansdale, the East Penn Railroad in Telford, and the New Hope Railroad in Warminster.

== Operations ==
The Pennsylvania Northeastern Railroad operates on 55.53 miles (89.37 km) of SEPTA-owned trackage mostly in Bucks and Montgomery counties to the north of Philadelphia, with some lines extending into northern portions of Philadelphia. The lines operated by the Pennsylvania Northeastern Railroad include the Bethlehem Branch from Newtown Junction to Telford, the Doylestown Branch from Lansdale to Doylestown, the New Hope Branch from Glenside to Ivyland, the New York Line from Jenkintown to Neshaminy Falls, as well as a 3-mile (4.8 km) portion of the Stony Creek Branch near Lansdale. The Pennsylvania Northeastern Railroad also operates the Lansdale Yard in Lansdale. The railroad interchanges with CSX Transportation in Lansdale, the New Hope Railroad in Warminster, and the East Penn Railroad in Telford. The Pennsylvania Northeastern Railroad offers various freight rail services including transloading of bulk commodities between railcars and trucks, rail access to warehouse facilities including Lansdale Warehouse and AmeriCold Logistics LLC in Hatfield and storage of railcars.

PN mostly operates under codes like W230, J930, and L160. W230 runs for the night shift, J930 does work in Warminster, and L160 does daylight shifts.

== History ==
In December 2010, it was announced that a newly formed shortline, the Pennsylvania Northeastern Railroad, would be taking over freight operations in the Lansdale area from CSX. Under the new arrangement, CSX would still move freight north from Philadelphia while the PN would serve customers in Lansdale, Hatfield, Souderton, Telford and Warminster. In addition, PN serves as a bridge route for rail traffic bound for the East Penn Railroad's Quakertown line, and the New Hope Railroad. The Pennsylvania Northeastern Railroad took over operations from CSX in August 2011.

== Roster ==
Image	Number	Classification	Builder	Built	Heritage	Notes
	5315	SD40-2W	General Motors Diesel	1979	Canadian National	Purchased 2011. Painted in PN's executive scheme. Equipped with cab signals.
	5342	SD40-2W	General Motors Diesel	1980	Canadian National	Purchased 2011. Painted in PN's executive scheme. Equipped with cab signals.
	5577	SD40-2	General Motors Diesel	1972	Canadian Pacific	Purchased 2007 for NHRR. Painted in PN's executive scheme in 2023. Equipped with cab signals.
	7010	GP9rm	General Motors Diesel	1959	Canadian National	Originally built as CN GP9 4327, rebuilt in 1985 as 7010. Purchased 2011. Wears PN "simplified" livery. Used on occasional revenue freight and special excursion runs on the New Hope Railroad.
	7210	GP9rm	General Motors Diesel	1959	Canadian National	Originally built as CN GP9 4312, rebuilt 1989 as 7210. Purchased 2011. Wears patched CN livery. Currently in storage at New Hope, out of Service.
	8212	C39-8	GE Transportation	1986	Norfolk Southern, Ex-Conrail	Originally CR 6021. Purchased 2010. Wears patched out Conrail livery. Equipped with cab signals. Currently stored out of service in Lansdale.
	8701	SD60	Electro-Motive Diesel	1989	CSX	Built 1989 for CSX by EMD, retired 2017. Purchased by PN in 2019. Wears patched CSX livery with Pennsylvania Northeastern lettering. Equipped with cab signals.
	8711	SD60	Electro-Motive Diesel	1984	CSX, Ex-Conrail, Exx-EMDX	Used by Electro-Motive Diesel as a demonstrator locomotive (EMDX No. 2) for the SD60s. Purchased by Conrail in 1986 and became CR No. 6842. Became CSX 8711 in 2000. Purchased by PN in 2019. Wears patched CSX livery with Pennsylvania Northeastern lettering.

=== Former units ===
Image	Number	Classification	Builder	Built	Heritage	Notes
	8211	C39-8	GE Transportation	1986	Norfolk Southern, Ex-Conrail	Originally CR 6017. Purchased 2010. Has worn patched out NS livery. Withdrawn from service between 2018 and 2019 and was used as parts source for 8212. Scrapped 2021.
	5834, 5843	B36-7	GE Transportation	1985	CSX, ex-SBD	Originally SBD 5834 & 5843. Purchased 2016. Both worn CSX YN2 livery. Never operated in revenue service, both scrapped in 2021.
	8218	GP9u (DRS-17)	General Motors Diesel	1957 (original), 1980s (Rebuild)	CP	Originally CP GP9 #8678. Purchased 2016. Wore patched CP Livery. Transferred to New Hope & Ivyland Railroad in 2017.

== See also ==
- Rail transportation in the United States
- List of Pennsylvania railroads
- New Hope Railroad
- East Penn Railroad
