= Bethlehem Union Station =

Former rail station in Bethlehem, Pennsylvania, US

Bethlehem
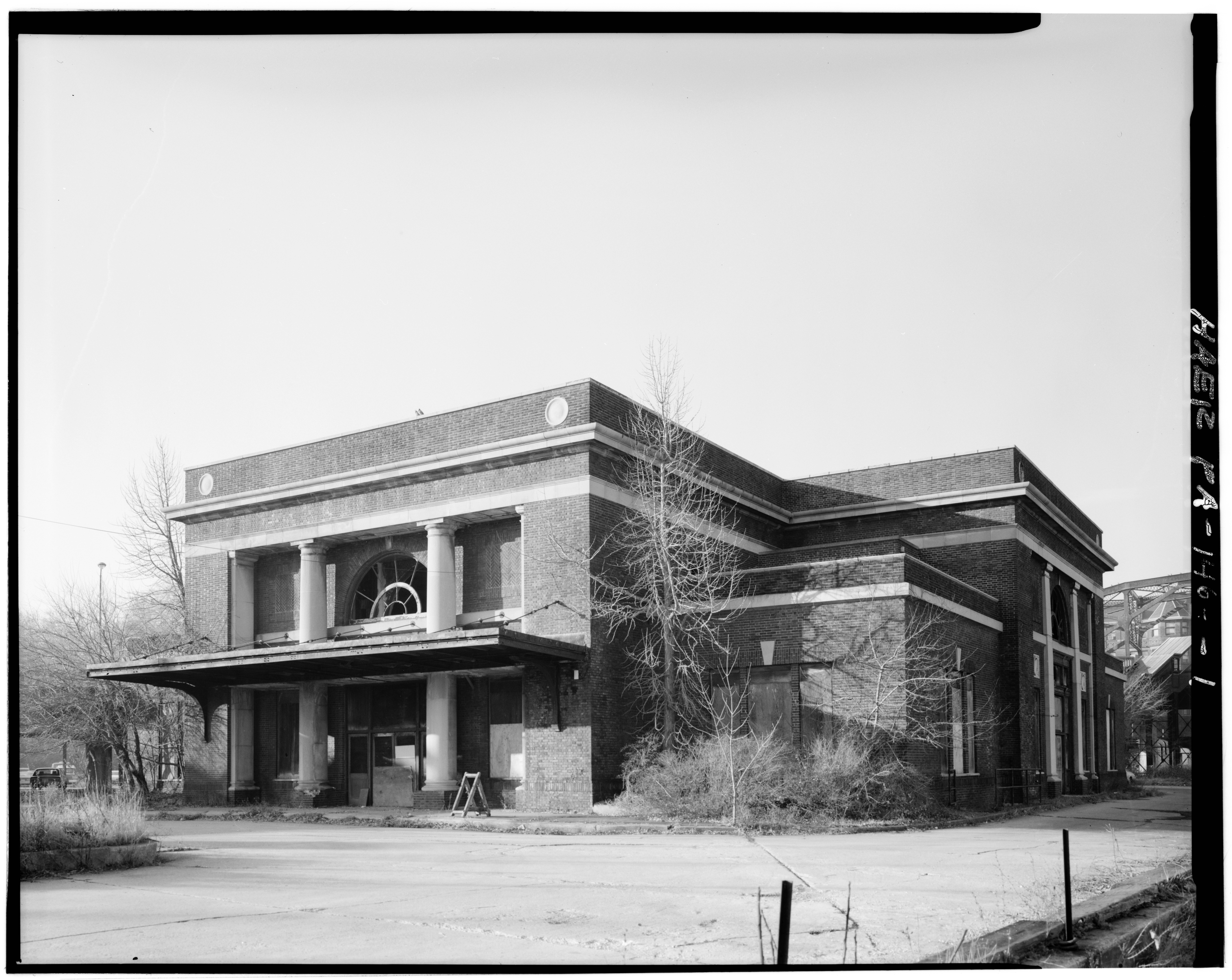
- Bethlehem Union Station in 1979

General information
- Location: 240 Union Station Plaza; Bethlehem, Pennsylvania
- Coordinates: 40°36′49.67″N 75°22′59.28″W
- Owner: St. Luke's Hospital
- Tracks: 2

History
- Opened: c. 1851
- Closed: June 30, 1981
- Rebuilt: November 18, 1867; 1924

Former lines & services
Preceding station	SEPTA	Following station
Allentown Closed 1979 Terminus	Bethlehem Line	Hellertown toward Reading Terminal
Preceding station	Reading Railroad	Following station
Terminus	Bethlehem Branch	Hellertown toward Fern Rock
Preceding station	Lehigh Valley Railroad	Following station
Allentown toward Buffalo	Main Line	Easton toward New York or Jersey City
Allentown toward Buffalo	Main Line	Freemansburg toward New York or Jersey City
Location

Bethlehem Union Station is a former train station located in the South Side neighborhood of Bethlehem, Pennsylvania. It was built in 1924 by the Lehigh Valley Railroad and the Reading Company, replacing an earlier station built in 1867. Passenger service to Philadelphia on the SEPTA Regional Rail Bethlehem Line lasted until 1981. The station was renovated in 2002 and used for medical clinics beginning in 2003. It is owned by St. Luke's Hospital.

== History ==
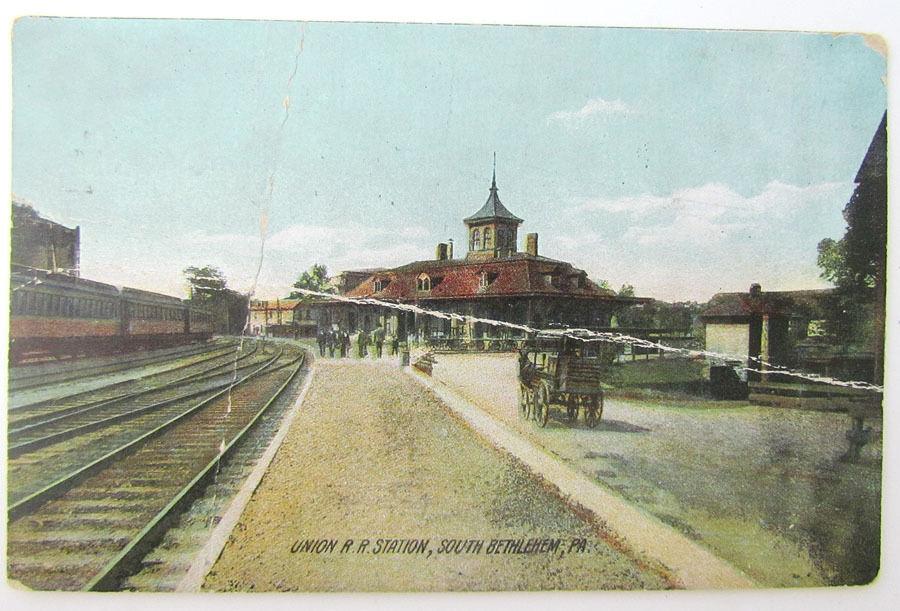
Postcard of Bethlehem Union Depot in 1909

In 1745, the Crown Inn was established as Bethlehem, Pennsylvania's first public house to serve stagecoach travelers. It soon became an important meeting point in the city, even after the nearby ferry was replaced with a bridge in 1794. The Lehigh Valley Railroad and North Pennsylvania Railroad both reached Bethlehem by 1855; in 1857, the Crown Inn was demolished to allow a new junction between the two railroads at the Lehigh Valley Railroad's South Bethlehem station.

The two railroads built Bethlehem Union Depot, which opened on November 18, 1867. A two-story building with a pointed tower, it was not well liked. In 1924, it was replaced by Bethlehem Union Station, a larger modern brick building.

Lehigh Valley passenger service ended on February 4, 1961, the last trains being the Maple Leaf and John Wilkes. The Lackawanna and Reading railroads' Interstate Express and the Reading's Scranton Flyer made stops at the station up to 1957 and 1949 respectively.

In 1962, the two railroads attempted to auction off the station building. However, it was not sold, and the property passed to Conrail when the Reading folded in 1976. Conrail continued to provide commuter service to Allentown under contract to SEPTA, which had been subsidizing service since 1966. As SEPTA discontinued its diesel service in favor of shorter electric lines, the line was cut back to Bethlehem in 1979. In April 1981, SEPTA announced its intentions to discontinue service on the line on July 1. PennDOT attempted to operate service but a last-minute deal with the Berks Area Regional Transportation Authority to operate the trains fell through during contract negotiations. Service was cut back to Quakertown on July 1, then to Lansdale in August.

Some restoration work was performed on the derelict station in the 1980s, but it was unused until Ashley Development Corporation refurbished it in 2002. St. Luke's Hospital moved clinics into Union Station in 2003, and bought the building outright in 2008. However, St. Luke's moved most of its services to a nearby building in 2011 and 2013.

== See also ==
- Bethlehem station (Central Railroad of New Jersey)
