= Steve Malagari =

American politician

Steven R. Malagari
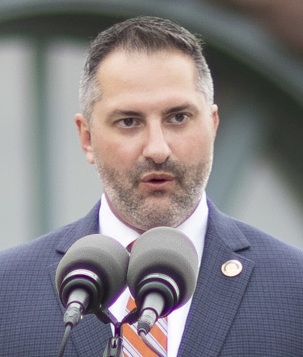

Member of the Pennsylvania House of Representatives from the 53rd district
- Incumbent
- Assumed office January 1, 2019
- Preceded by: Robert Godshall

Personal details
- Born: October 17, 1983 (age 42) Lansdale, Pennsylvania, U.S.
- Party: Democratic
- Spouse: Rachel Malagari
- Education: Ursinus College (B.S.)
- Occupation: Sales representative
- Website: Official site

Steven R. Malagari (born October 17, 1983) is an American politician serving as a Democratic member of the Pennsylvania House of Representatives for the 53rd district. He has held the position since January 1, 2019.

== Career ==
In 2012, Malagari was elected to the Lansdale Borough Council and served in the position until he was elected to the House in 2018. He also served on the Montgomery County Transportation Authority starting in 2013.

In 2018, Malagari beat fellow Lansdale Borough Councilman Leon Angelichio for the Democratic nomination. Malagari challenged Republican Andy Szekely and Libertarian John Waldenberger for the seat left vacant by Representative Bob Godshall, and ultimately won the election on November 6, 2018, becoming the first Democrat to hold the seat since 1972.

=== Committee assignments ===
- Consumer Affairs
- Liquor Control
- Local Government
- Tourism & Recreational Development

== Personal ==
Malagari is a graduate of North Penn High School. He graduated from Ursinus College where he earned a Bachelors of Science in Biology and German.

He lives in Lansdale with his wife Rachel.
