= East Penn Railroad =

Railway line in the United States of America

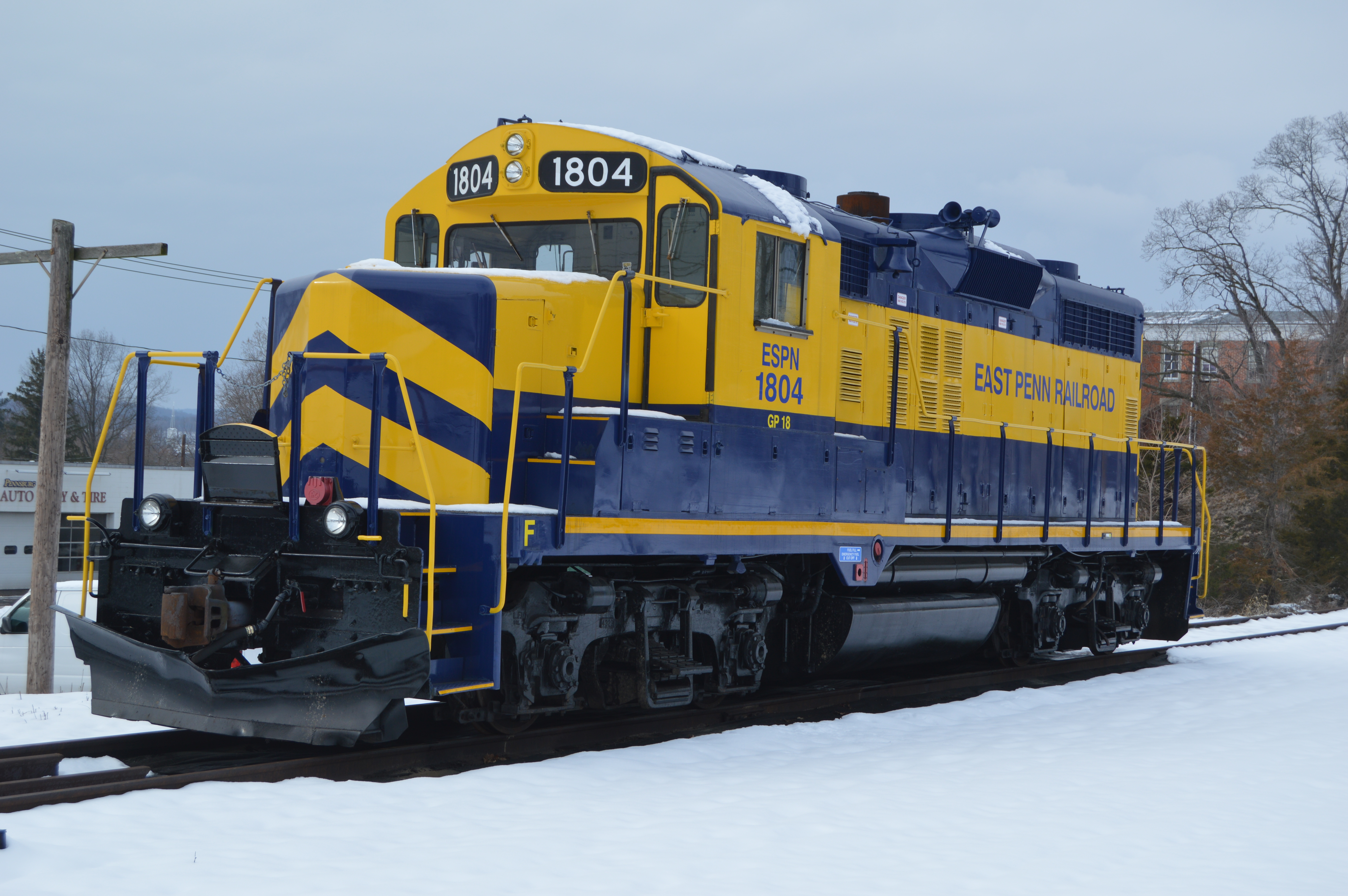
- An EMD GP18 commercial train on the East Penn Railroad in Pennsburg, Pennsylvania, in April 2014

Overview
- Headquarters: Kennett Square, Pennsylvania, U.S.
- Reporting mark: ESPN
- Locale: Pennsylvania; Delaware
- Dates of operation: 2007–present
- Predecessor: East Penn Railways; Penn Eastern Rail Lines

Technical
- Track gauge: 4 ft 8 1/2 in (1,435 mm) standard gauge
- Length: 114 mi (183 km)

Other
- Website: www.regional-rail.com/east-penn-railroad-llc/

The East Penn Railroad (reporting mark ESPN) is a short-line railroad located in Kennett Square, Pennsylvania, it operates a number of mostly-unconnected lines in Pennsylvania and Delaware. Except for two industrial park switching operations, all are former Pennsylvania Railroad or Reading Company lines, abandoned or sold by Conrail or its predecessors.

The East Penn Railroad was formed in 2007 through a merger of East Penn Railways (reporting mark EPRY) and Penn Eastern Rail Lines (reporting mark PRL), each of which began operating in the 1990s. The railroad is owned by Regional Rail, LLC, which also owns the Middletown and New Jersey Railroad, Tyburn Railroad, Carolina Coastal Railway, Florida Central Railroad, Florida Northern Railroad, and Florida Midland Railroad.

== History ==
In 2007, the East Penn Railroad (ESPN) was formed by the merger of East Penn Railway and Penn Eastern Rail Lines. Since the merger, the railroad has improved service and infrastructure on lines with customer growth potential; weaker lines were abandoned or sold off. 4.5 miles (7.2 km) of track was returned to service. A yard was also constructed in Pocopson, Pennsylvania along the Wilmington and Northern Branch (W&N). ESPN has acquired additional locomotives and replaced older locomotives to handle increased traffic, including two rebuilt EMD GP38-2's from GATX used along the W&N and Octoraro lines.

ESPN attempted to abandon the Colebrookdale line between Pottstown and Boyertown in 2008; it was eventually purchased by Berks County. In 2010, the Chester Valley line between King of Prussia and Bridgeport was abandoned and subsequently sold to Montgomery County and became part of the Chester Valley Trail.

On August 1, 2011, the East Penn Railroad took over operations from Norfolk Southern on the York Industrial Track between York and Stonybook. In December 2012, the former Raritan River 40' boxcar #100, stored on East Penn tracks at its Quakertown depot, was restored, representing one of the few surviving pieces of equipment from the former Raritan River Railroad.

Since 2011, a total of eight derailments have happened along the East Penn Railroad in various locations, including northern Delaware, Chester County, and Bucks County. In August 2022, six cars derailed in Chester County, narrowly missing a home.

== Operations ==
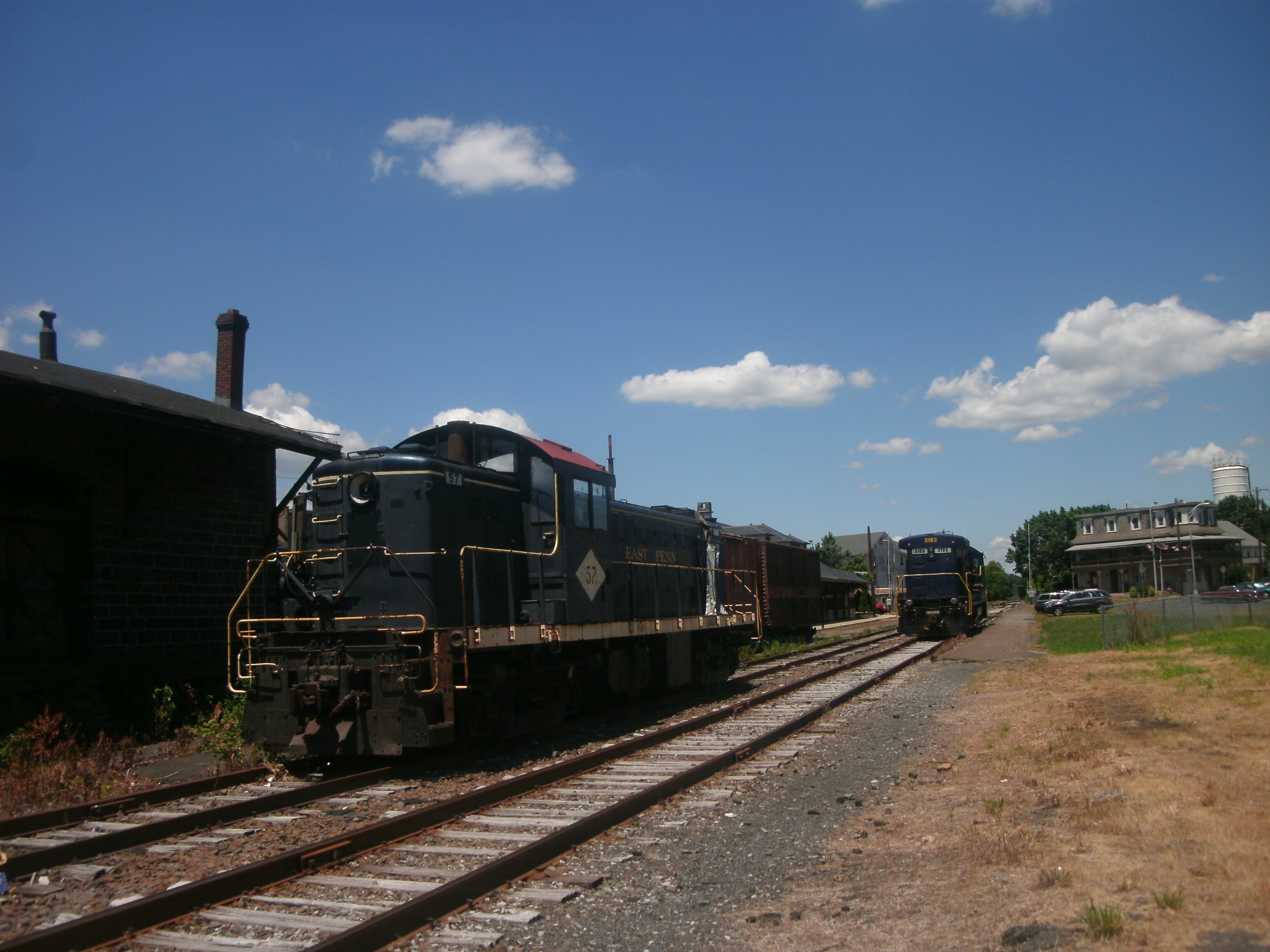
The East Penn Railroad's ALCO RS-1 57 and GE B23-7 3153 in Quakertown

ESPN operates 114 miles of track in eastern Pennsylvania and northern Delaware and 16 commercial locomotives. The railroad operates multiple disconnected segments with locomotives assigned to each segment. Two or three lines have service daily.

They include the following lines:

=== Bristol ===
This line consists of industrial park trackage in the Bristol, Pennsylvania area, interchanging with Conrail Shared Assets Operations (CSAO).

=== Lancaster Northern ===
This line, which is owned and operated by ESPN, runs from Ephrata, Pennsylvania northeast, interchanging with Norfolk Southern Railway (NS) in Reading, Pennsylvania, using trackage rights on NS between Sinking Spring, Pennsylvania and Reading.

=== Manheim ===
This line consists of owned trackage in the Manheim, Pennsylvania area, interchanging with NS.

=== North East Philadelphia ===
The North East Philadelphia line consists of owned trackage in Northeast Philadelphia, interchanging with CSAO in the Bustleton area of Philadelphia.

=== Octoraro ===
The Octoraro line, which is owned and operated by ESPN, consists of trackage, the former Octoraro Branch, from end-of-track in Sylmar east to Chadds Ford, Pennsylvania, where it connects to the Wilmington and Northern Branch. SEPTA owns the passenger rights on the Octoraro Line.

=== Perkiomen ===
The Perkiomen line, which is owned and operated by ESPN, runs from Pennsburg, Pennsylvania north, where it interchanges with NS in Emmaus, Pennsylvania.

=== Quakertown ===
The Quakertown Line operates on the SEPTA-owned Bethlehem Line from Quakertown, Pennsylvania south, and interchanges with the Pennsylvania Northeastern Railroad in Telford.

=== Wilmington and Northern Branch ===
The Wilmington and Northern Branch line, which is owned and operated by ESPN, runs from interchange with CSX Transportation in Elsmere, Delaware north, interchanging with NS in Coatesville, Pennsylvania. The Octoraro Line connects with the Wilmington and Northern line in Chadds Ford, Pennsylvania.

=== York Industrial Track ===
The line operated by ESPN consists of trackage from interchange with NS in York, Pennsylvania to Stonybrook, Pennsylvania.

=== Former ===
- Colebrookdale: operated from Boyertown, Pennsylvania south to interchange with NS in Pottstown, Pennsylvania. ESPN attempted to abandon the line in 2008. The Berks County Redevelopment Authority purchased the railroad that same year, and appointed the Eastern Berks Gateway Railroad to operate freight service. The Eastern Berks Gateway Railroad has left the line in late 2013 due to no or very little freight on the line. The Colebrookdale Railroad Preservation Trust was also created in 2011 for tourist railroad purposes. Tourist rail service began in October 2014 as the Colebrookdale Railroad.
- Chester Valley: owned and operated from King of Prussia, Pennsylvania north to interchange with NS in Bridgeport, Pennsylvania. The line was abandoned by ESPN in 2010; tracks were dismantled in May 2011. The line was converted into a portion of the Chester Valley Trail by Montgomery County.
- Kutztown: operated on trackage owned by the Kutztown Transportation Authority from Kutztown, Pennsylvania southeast to interchange with NS in Topton, Pennsylvania. This line is now operated by the Allentown and Auburn Railroad, which hauls passengers in historic equipment and freight for local businesses.
- Venice Island Industrial Spur: operated on trackage owned by Norfolk Southern from West Falls Yard to the end of Venice Island in the Manayunk neighborhood of Philadelphia and abandoned April 4, 2017.
