= Allentown station (Lehigh Valley Railroad) =

Former train station in Allentown, Pennsylvania, US

Allentown
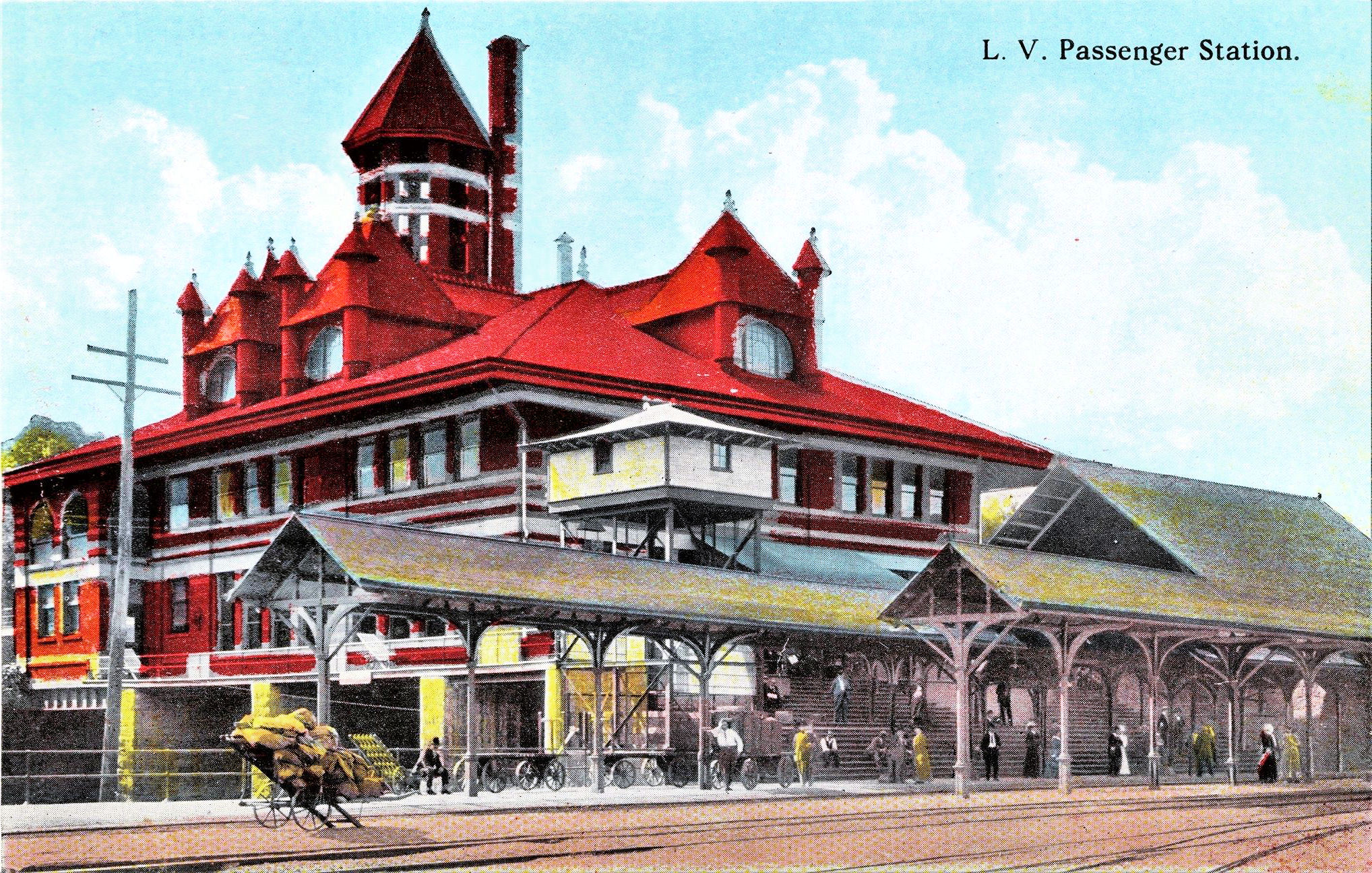
- Postcard depicting the station in 1910

General information
- Location: 4th and Hamilton streets (PA 222), Allentown, Pennsylvania, U.S.
- Coordinates: 40°36′14″N 075°27′51″W
- Line: Lehigh Valley Railroad

History
- Opened: 1890
- Closed: 1961

Former services
Preceding station	Lehigh Valley Railroad	Following station
Catasauqua toward Buffalo	Main Line	Bethlehem toward New York or Jersey City
Fullerton toward Buffalo	Main Line	Bethlehem toward New York or Jersey City
Preceding station	SEPTA	Following station
Terminus	Bethlehem Line	Bethlehem toward Reading Terminal
Location

Allentown was a train station in Allentown, Pennsylvania. It was opened by the Lehigh Valley Railroad in 1890 and closed in 1961. The building was demolished in 1972. The station was located one block west of the Central Railroad of New Jersey's Allentown station.

== History ==
=== 19th century ===
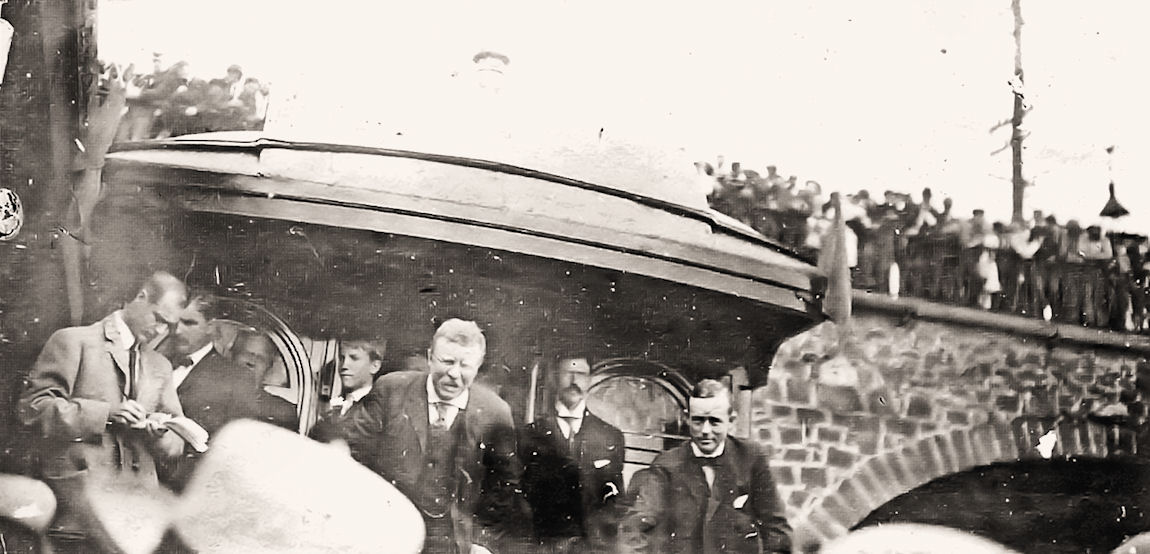
U.S. president Theodore Roosevelt arriving at Allentown station in August 1905

The Lehigh Valley Railroad opened its original line between Allentown and Easton, Pennsylvania in 1855; the first passenger train ran between the two cities on June 11. In 1890, the Lehigh Valley Railroad relocated its station to downtown Allentown, just off its main line. The station stood near the intersection of Hamilton and 4th streets, adjacent to Jordan Creek.

Long-distance passenger trains included the Asa Packer, which ran from New York City to Mauch Chunk in present-day Jim Thorpe, Pennsylvania, the John Wilkes, which ran from New York City to Wilkes-Barre, Pennsylvania, the Black Diamond and the Star, which both ran from New York City to Buffalo, and the Maple Leaf, which ran from New York City to Toronto. Each of these had continuing equipment or connecting services to Philadelphia.

The Philadelphia Inquirer noted on September 6, 1889, that "Both the Lehigh Valley and the Allentown Terminal Railroads are pushing work on their new passenger stations in this city [Allentown]. The abutments are being laid for the former. The latter's foundations are complete. Wilson Brothers, of Philadelphia, are the architects of both depots, and they will be the handsomest in the Lehigh Valley."

=== 20th century ===
The railroad abandoned its remaining passenger trains on February 4, 1961, after years of financial losses and declining patronage. Allentown was one of several passenger-only stations that closed as a result. The abandoned station was demolished in 1972 to permit the construction of an enlarged road bridge over Jordan Creek.

Service along the former Lehigh Valley route to Allentown resumed in 1978. Conrail, which took over the Lehigh Valley Railroad's lines in 1976, began operating commuter trains from Allentown to Philadelphia. The service was funded by the federal government and the Pennsylvania Department of Transportation. Trains stopped at a platform at Third and Union Streets in Allentown, approximately a block south of where the Lehigh Valley's station had stood.

Service began on July 31, 1978, with four round trips to Philadelphia. The service was an extension of SEPTA's existing Bethlehem Line trains. The station included a platform, small shelter, and an unpaved parking lot. Service between Allentown and Bethlehem, Pennsylvania ended on August 20, 1979, amid low patronage and a dispute over the subsidy for the service.
