= North Pennsylvania Railroad =

Railroad in southeastern Pennsylvania (1852-1879)

Overview
- Dates of operation: 1852–1976
- Successor: Conrail; SEPTA

Technical
- Track gauge: 4 ft 8 1/2 in (1,435 mm)

North Pennsylvania Railroad was a railroad company which served Philadelphia, Montgomery County, Bucks County and Northampton County in Pennsylvania. It was formed in 1852, and began operation in 1855. The Philadelphia and Reading Railway, predecessor to the Reading Company, leased the North Pennsylvania in 1879. Its tracks were transferred to Conrail and the Southeastern Pennsylvania Transportation Authority (SEPTA) in 1976.

== History ==
The company incorporated on April 8, 1852, as the Philadelphia, Easton and Water Gap. Construction began on June 16, 1853; the company changed its name to the North Pennsylvania Railroad on October 3 that year. The new name reflected the grand (and unrealized) ambitions of the company to extend all the way across Pennsylvania to Waverly, New York and a junction with the Erie Railroad. The railway opened between Front and Willow Streets, Philadelphia and Gwynedd on July 2, 1855, a distance of 18 1/2 miles (29.8 km). On October 7 the Doylestown Branch opened to Doylestown via Lansdale. Within Philadelphia, the company's passenger depot was located at Third and Berks; tracks continued south to a freight depot at Willow and Front street on the waterfront.

In 1856, the company suffered its first accident in the Great Train Wreck of 1856, the most significant railroad wreck in the world up to that time. The railroad continued to expand northward from Philadelphia. The main line reached Bethlehem, running parallel to the Bethlehem Pike, on July 7, 1857. At Bethlehem the railroad interchanged with the Lehigh Valley Railroad. The Shimersville Branch, from Iron Hill to the former town of Shimersville on the Lehigh Valley Railroad east of Bethlehem, opened on January 1, 1857. The branch carried little traffic; the North Pennsylvania leased it that same year to the Lehigh Valley and Delaware Water Gap Railroad as part of a stillborn venture to build a new route through Easton to a junction with the Delaware, Lackawanna and Western Railroad. By the time of the Reading lease the branch was out of service.

The company built, with the Delaware and Bound Brook Railroad, a line from Jenkintown to Bound Brook, New Jersey, creating a new route between Philadelphia and New York. The Delaware River Branch opened on May 1, 1876, in time for the Centennial Exposition.

=== Reading control ===
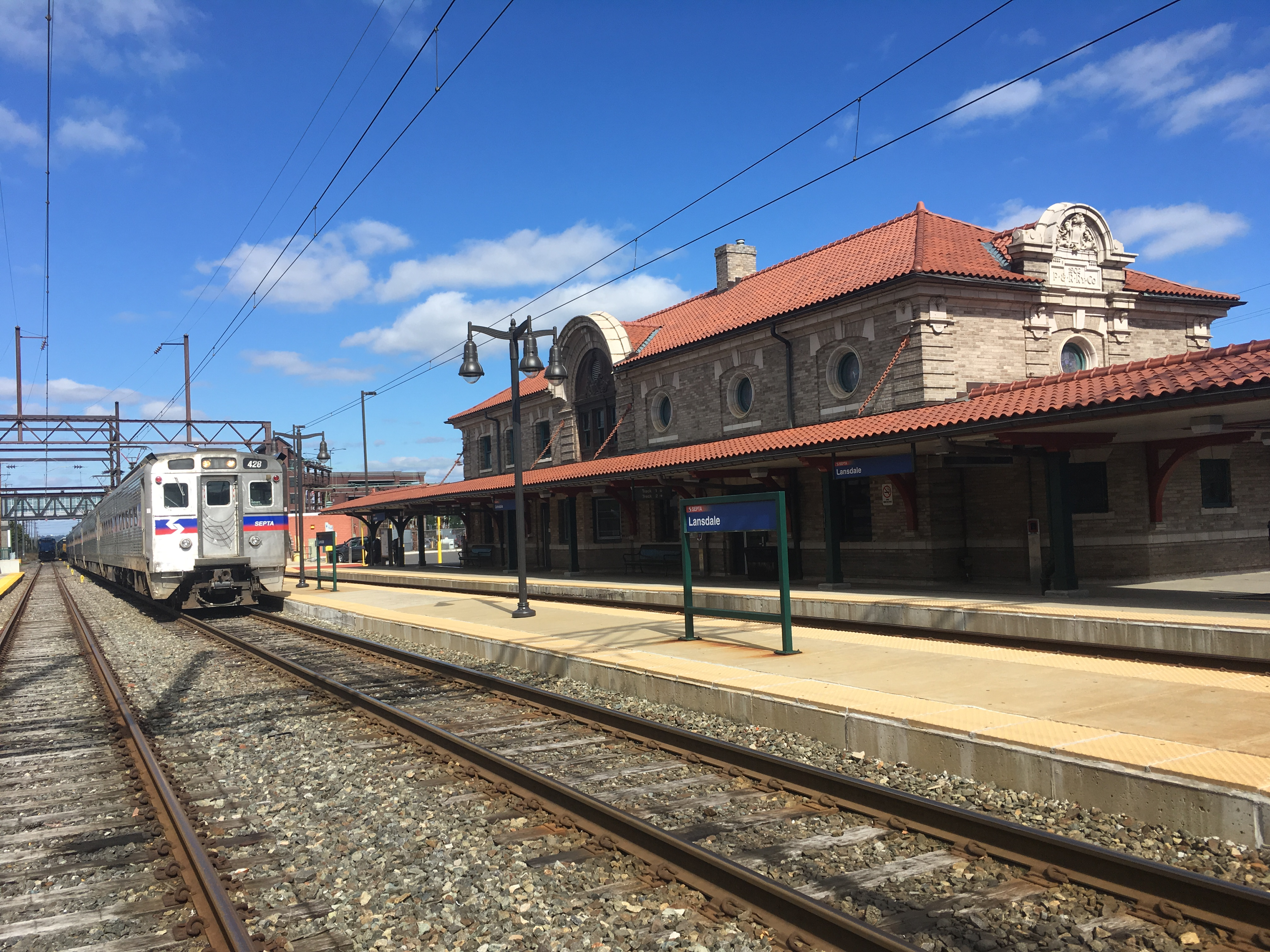
Lansdale station on the North Pennsylvania Railroad, built in 1902 by the Philadelphia & Reading Railway, currently used by SEPTA's Lansdale/Doylestown Line

The Philadelphia & Reading Railway leased North Pennsylvania Railroad on May 14, 1879. The North Pennsylvania continued to exist as a company, and would be merged along with the Reading into Conrail in 1976 as a result of the Reading's final bankruptcy. Most of the North Pennsylvania's lines continue to exist:

- The main line was redesignated as the Reading Company's Bethlehem Branch, with through passenger service maintained under SEPTA until 1981. The segment north of Quakertown has since been decommissioned and repurposed for interim recreational trail use, while service south of Fern Rock in Philadelphia has similarly ceased. SEPTA currently operates commuter rail service via the Lansdale/Doylestown Line, terminating at Doylestown. Freight operations between Lansdale and Quakertown are conducted by the Pennsylvania Northeastern Railroad and the East Penn Railroad.
- The Delaware River Branch was redesignated as the New York Branch, and the Reading Company additionally leased the Delaware and Bound Brook Railroad. Under the 1967 Aldene Plan, through passenger service to Jersey City, New Jersey was rerouted to Newark, New Jersey, where it continued until 1981. SEPTA's West Trenton Line currently operates as far as West Trenton, with NJ Transit having provided service from West Trenton to Newark until its discontinuation in 1982. The line remains active for freight transport and now forms part of CSX Transportation's Trenton Subdivision.
- The North East Pennsylvania Railroad route was redesignated as the New Hope Branch. SEPTA currently operates its Warminster Line as far as Warminster, Pennsylvania, while the New Hope Railroad owns and operates the segment between Warminster and New Hope.
- The Stony Creek Railroad was incorporated into the Reading system as the Stony Creek Branch. SEPTA provides commuter rail service along this line via the Manayunk/Norristown Line, operating between the Norristown Transit Center and Elm Street Station. CSX Transportation retains trackage rights along this corridor.

== See also ==
- List of railroads transferred to Conrail
