= List of places in Pennsylvania: Sa–Si =

This list of cities, towns, unincorporated communities, counties, and other recognized places in the U.S. state of Pennsylvania also includes information on the number and names of counties in which the place lies, and its lower and upper zip code bounds, if applicable.

Name of place	Number of counties	Principal county	Lower zip code	Upper zip code
Sabinsville	1	Tioga County	16943	
Sabula	1	Clearfield County	15801	
Sackett	1	Elk County	16735	
Sackville	1	Delaware County		
Saco	1	Bradford County	18850	
Saco	1	Lackawanna County		
Sacramento	1	Schuylkill County	17968	
Sadlers Corner	1	Venango County		
Sadsbury Meeting House	1	Lancaster County		
Sadsbury Township	1	Chester County		
Sadsbury Township	1	Crawford County		
Sadsbury Township	1	Lancaster County		
Sadsburyville	1	Chester County	19369	
Saegers	1	Lycoming County		
Saegersville	1	Lehigh County	18053	
Saegertown	1	Crawford County	16433	
Safe Harbor	1	Lancaster County	17516	
Sagamore	1	Armstrong County	16250	
Sagamore	1	Fayette County	15446	
Sagamore Estates	1	Pike County		
Saginaw	1	York County	17347	
Sagon	1	Northumberland County	17872	
Sagon Junction	1	Northumberland County		
St. Albans	1	Delaware County	19073	
St. Augustine	1	Cambria County	16636	
St. Benedict	1	Cambria County	15773	
St. Boniface	1	Cambria County	16675	
St. Charles	1	Clarion County	16242	
St. Clair	1	Allegheny County		
St. Clair	1	Schuylkill County	17970	
St. Clair	1	Westmoreland County	15601	
St. Clair Acres	1	Allegheny County	15241	
St. Clair Township	1	Westmoreland County		
St. Clairsville	1	Bedford County	16667	
St. Davids	1	Delaware County	19087	
St. George	1	Venango County	16374	
St. Joe	1	Butler County		
St. Johns	1	Luzerne County	18247	
St. Joseph	1	Susquehanna County	18818	
St. Lawrence	1	Berks County	19606	
St. Lawrence	1	Cambria County	16668	
St. Leonard	1	Bucks County	18940	
St. Martins	1	Philadelphia County		
St. Marys	1	Chester County		
St. Marys	1	Elk County	15857	
Saint Marys Seminary	1	Montgomery County		
St. Michael	1	Cambria County	15951	
St. Michael-Sidman	1	Cambria County		
St. Nicholas	1	Schuylkill County	17948	
St. Paul	1	Somerset County	15552	
Saint Pauls Church	1	Philadelphia County		
St. Peters	1	Chester County	19470	
St. Petersburg	1	Clarion County	16054	
St. Thomas	1	Franklin County	17252	
St. Thomas Township	1	Franklin County		
St. Vincent College	1	Westmoreland County	15650	
St. Vincent Shaft	1	Westmoreland County	15650	
Salco	1	Somerset County	15530	
Salem	1	Clearfield County	15801	
Salem	1	Franklin County	17201	
Salem	1	Mercer County	16125	
Salem	1	Snyder County	17870	
Salem Harbor	1	Bucks County	19020	
Salem Township	1	Clarion County		
Salem Township	1	Luzerne County		
Salem Township	1	Mercer County		
Salem Township	1	Wayne County		
Salem Township	1	Westmoreland County		
Salemville	1	Bedford County	16664	
Salford	1	Montgomery County	18957	
Salford Heights	1	Montgomery County	19438	
Salford Township	1	Montgomery County		
Salfordville	1	Montgomery County	18958	
Salida	1	Allegheny County	15227	
Salina	1	Westmoreland County	15680	
Salisbury	1	Somerset County	15558	
Salisbury Heights	1	Lancaster County	17527	
Salisbury Junction	1	Somerset County	15552	
Salisbury Township	1	Lancaster County		
Salisbury Township	1	Lehigh County		
Salix	1	Cambria County	15952	
Salix-Beauty Line Park	1	Cambria County		
Salladasburg	1	Lycoming County	17740	
Sally Ann	1	Berks County		
Salona	1	Clinton County	17767	
Saltillo	1	Huntingdon County	17253	
Saltlick Township	1	Fayette County		
Saltsburg	1	Indiana County	15681	
Salunga	1	Lancaster County	17538	
Salunga-Landisville	1	Lancaster County		
Saluvia	1	Fulton County	17228	
Sample	1	Allegheny County		
Sample Heights	1	Allegheny County	15209	
Sample Run	1	Indiana County	15728	
Sample Spur Junction	1	Lawrence County		
Sampson	1	Erie County		
Sampson	1	Washington County	15063	
Sampson-Grandview-Eldora	1	Washington County		
Sanatoga	1	Montgomery County	19464	
Sanatoga Park	1	Montgomery County	19464	
Sanbourn	1	Clearfield County	16651	
Sand Beach	1	Dauphin County	17033	
Sand Hill	1	Lebanon County	17042	
Sand Hill	1	Westmoreland County		
Sand Patch	1	Somerset County	15552	
Sand Spring	1	Luzerne County	18222	
Sandertown	1	Cambria County		
Sandhill	1	Monroe County	18354	
Sandrock	1	Greene County		
Sandts Eddy	1	Northampton County	18042	
Sandy	1	Clearfield County	15801	
Sandy Bank	1	Delaware County	19063	
Sandy Creek	1	Allegheny County	15147	
Sandy Creek Township	1	Mercer County		
Sandy Hill	1	Montgomery County	19401	
Sandy Hollow	1	Clarion County	16248	
Sandy Hook	1	Franklin County		
Sandy Lake	1	Mercer County	16145	
Sandy Lake Township	1	Mercer County		
Sandy Lick	1	Butler County		
Sandy Plains	1	Washington County	15322	
Sandy Point	1	Butler County		
Sandy Ridge	1	Centre County	16677	
Sandy Run	1	Greene County	15338	
Sandy Run	1	Luzerne County	18224	
Sandy Valley	1	Jefferson County	15851	
Sandy Township	1	Clearfield County		
Sandycreek Township	1	Venango County		
Sandyville	1	Pike County	18324	
Sanford	1	Warren County	16340	
Sankertown	1	Cambria County	16630	
Santiago	1	Allegheny County		
Sarah Furnace	1	Clarion County	16248	
Sardis	1	Westmoreland County	15668	
Sartwell	1	McKean County	16731	
Sarver	1	Butler County	16055	
Sarversville	1	Butler County	16055	
Sassamansville	1	Montgomery County	19472	
Satterfield	1	Sullivan County	18614	
Satterfield Junction	1	Sullivan County	18614	
Saulsburg	1	Huntingdon County	16652	
Savage	1	Somerset County		
Savan	1	Indiana County		
Saverys Mill	1	Chester County		
Saville	1	Perry County	17074	
Saville Township	1	Perry County		
Sawtown	1	Venango County	16301	
Sawyer City	1	McKean County	16701	
Saxonburg	1	Butler County	16056	
Saxton	1	Bedford County	16678	
Saybrook	1	Warren County	16347	
Saylorsburg	1	Monroe County	18353	
Saylorsville	1	Carbon County		
Sayre	1	Bradford County	18840	
Scab Hill	1	Westmoreland County		
Scalp Level	1	Cambria County	15963	
Scammells Corner	1	Bucks County		
Scandia	1	Warren County	16345	
Scarlan Hill	1	Cambria County		
Scarlets Mill	1	Berks County	19508	
Scattertown	1	Elk County		
Scenery Hill	1	Washington County	15360	
Scenic Hills	1	Delaware County	19064	
Schades Corner	1	Chester County		
Schaefferstown	1	Lebanon County	17088	
Scheidy	1	Lehigh County		
Schellsburg	1	Bedford County	15559	
Schenley	1	Armstrong County	15682	
Schenley Heights	1	Allegheny County		
Scherersville	1	Lehigh County		
Schills	1	Clarion County		
Schlusser	1	Cumberland County		
Schnecksville	1	Lehigh County	18078	
Schoeneck	1	Lancaster County	17578	
Schoeneck	1	Northampton County	18064	
Schoenersville	1	Northampton County		
Schoentown	1	Schuylkill County	17965	
Schofer	1	Berks County	19530	
Schofield Corners	1	Mercer County		
Schollard	1	Mercer County		
School Lane	1	Lancaster County	17603	
School Lane Hills	1	Lancaster County	17604	
Schracktown	1	Clinton County		
Schubert	1	Berks County	19507	
Schultzville	1	Berks County	19504	
Schultzville	1	Lackawanna County	18411	
Schuster Heights	1	Butler County	16229	
Schuyler	2	Montour County	17772	
Schuyler	2	Northumberland County	17772	
Schuylkill	1	Philadelphia County	19146	
Schuylkill Haven	1	Schuylkill County	17972	
Schuylkill Hills	1	Montgomery County	19401	
Schuylkill Township	1	Chester County		
Schuylkill Township	1	Schuylkill County		
Schweibinzville	1	Somerset County		
Schwenksville	1	Montgomery County	19473	
Sciota	1	Monroe County	18354	
Sconnelltown	1	Chester County	19380	
Scotch Hill	1	Clarion County	16233	
Scotch Hollow	1	Clearfield County	16666	
Scotia	1	Allegheny County	15025	
Scotia	1	Centre County		
Scotland	1	Franklin County	17254	
Scotrun	1	Monroe County	18355	
Scott	1	Lackawanna County		
Scott Center	1	Wayne County	18462	
Scott Haven	1	Westmoreland County	15083	
Scott Township	1	Allegheny County	15106	
Scott Township	1	Columbia County		
Scott Township	1	Lackawanna County		
Scott Township	1	Lawrence County		
Scott Township	1	Wayne County		
Scottdale	1	Westmoreland County	15683	
Scottsville	1	Beaver County	15001	
Scottsville	1	Wyoming County		
Scranton	1	Lackawanna County	18501	19
Scranton Army Ammunition Plant	1	Lackawanna County	18502	
Scrubgrass Township	1	Venango County		
Scullton	1	Somerset County	15557	
Scyoc	1	Perry County	17021	
Seagers	1	Lycoming County	17756	
Seal	1	Chester County		
Seamentown	1	Indiana County	15729	
Seanor	1	Somerset County	15953	
Searights	1	Fayette County	15401	
Sears	1	Philadelphia County		
Sebring	1	Tioga County	16930	
Secane	1	Delaware County	19018	
Secane Highlands	1	Delaware County	19018	
Sechrist Mill	1	York County		
Sedgwick	1	Adams County		
Sedgwick	1	Philadelphia County		
Sedwicks Mill	1	Butler County		
Seek	1	Schuylkill County	18218	
Seelyville	1	Wayne County	18431	
Seemsville	1	Northampton County	18067	
Seger	1	Westmoreland County	15627	
Seiberlingville	1	Lehigh County		
Seidersville	1	Northampton County	18015	
Seiple	1	Lehigh County		
Seipstown	1	Lehigh County	18031	
Seipsville	1	Northampton County		
Seisholtzville	1	Berks County	18062	
Seitzland	1	York County	17327	
Seitzville	1	York County	17360	
Seldersville	1	Cambria County		
Selea	1	Huntingdon County	17264	
Selinsgrove	1	Snyder County	17870	
Selinsgrove Junction	1	Northumberland County		
Selkirk	1	Warren County		
Sell	1	Adams County		
Sellersville	1	Bucks County	18960	
Seltzer	1	Schuylkill County	17974	
Seltzer City	1	Schuylkill County		
Seminole	1	Armstrong County	16253	
Seneca	1	Venango County	16346	
Seneca Valley	1	Westmoreland County	15642	
Sereno	1	Columbia County	17846	
Sergeant	1	McKean County	16735	
Sergeant Township	1	McKean County		
Seven Fields	1	Butler County	16046	
Seven Pines	1	Juniata County	17082	
Seven Points	1	Northumberland County	17801	
Seven Springs	2	Fayette County	15622	
Seven Springs	2	Somerset County	15622	
Seven Stars	1	Adams County	17307	
Seven Stars	1	Chester County		
Seven Stars	1	Huntingdon County		
Seven Stars	1	Juniata County	17062	
Seven Stars	1	Montgomery County		
Seven Valleys	1	York County	17360	
Seward	1	Westmoreland County	15954	
Sewickley	1	Allegheny County	15143	
Sewickley Heights	1	Allegheny County	15143	
Sewickley Heights Township	1	Allegheny County		
Sewickley Hills	1	Allegheny County	15143	
Sewickley Township	1	Allegheny County		
Sewickley Township	1	Westmoreland County		
Seybertown	1	Armstrong County	16028	
Seyfert	1	Berks County	19508	
Seyoc	1	Perry County		
Shackamaxon	1	Philadelphia County		
Shade Gap	1	Huntingdon County	17255	
Shade Township	1	Somerset County		
Shade Valley	1	Huntingdon County	17213	
Shadeland	1	Crawford County	16435	
Shades Glen	1	Luzerne County	18661	
Shadle	1	Snyder County	15666	
Shado-wood Village	1	Indiana County	15701	
Shadow Shuttle	1	Allegheny County	15235	
Shady Grove	1	Franklin County	17256	
Shady Plain	1	Armstrong County	15686	
Shadyside	1	Allegheny County	15232	
Shaffer	1	Clearfield County	15801	
Shaffers Corner	1	Fayette County	15416	
Shaffers Corners	1	Lackawanna County		
Shaffersville	1	Huntingdon County	16652	
Shaft	1	Schuylkill County	17976	
Shaft	1	Somerset County		
Shafton	1	Westmoreland County	15642	
Shainline	1	Montgomery County		
Shaler Township	1	Allegheny County		
Shalercrest	1	Allegheny County	15223	
Shamburg	1	Clarion County		
Shamburg	1	Venango County		
Shamokin	1	Northumberland County	17872	
Shamokin Dam	1	Snyder County	17876	
Shamokin Township	1	Northumberland County		
Shamrock	1	Berks County		
Shamrock	1	Fayette County	15401	
Shamrock	1	Greene County		
Shamrock	1	Northumberland County		
Shamrock	1	Somerset County		
Shamrock Station	1	Berks County	19539	
Shaner	1	Westmoreland County	15642	
Shaners Crossroads	1	Westmoreland County	15656	
Shanesville	1	Berks County	19512	
Shankles	1	Clearfield County	15801	
Shanks Mill	1	Adams County		
Shanksville	1	Somerset County	15560	
Shanktown	1	Indiana County	15777	
Shankweilers	1	Lehigh County		
Shannon Heights	1	Allegheny County	15235	
Shannondale	1	Clarion County	16240	
Shanor Heights	1	Butler County	16001	
Shanor-Northvue	1	Butler County		
Sharon	1	Mercer County	16146	
Sharon Center	1	Potter County	16748	
Sharon Hill	1	Delaware County	19079	
Sharon North	1	Mercer County	16146	
Sharon Park	1	Delaware County	19079	
Sharon Township	1	Potter County		
Sharpe	1	Fulton County		
Sharpe Hill	1	Allegheny County		
Sharps Hill	1	Allegheny County	15215	
Sharpsburg	1	Allegheny County	15215	
Sharpsburg	1	Huntingdon County	17060	
Sharpsville	1	Mercer County	16150	
Sharrertown	1	Washington County	15427	
Shartlesville	1	Berks County	19554	
Shavertown	1	Delaware County	19062	
Shavertown	1	Luzerne County	18708	
Shaw Junction	1	Lawrence County		
Shaw Mine	1	Washington County	15057	
Shaw Mines	1	Somerset County	15552	
Shawanese	1	Luzerne County	18654	
Shawmont	1	Philadelphia County		
Shawmut	1	Elk County	15823	
Shawnee	1	Mifflin County		
Shawnee	1	Monroe County		
Shawnee on Delaware	1	Monroe County	18356	
Shaws	1	Crawford County	16335	
Shaws Corners	1	Crawford County		
Shawsville	1	Clearfield County		
Shawtown	1	Westmoreland County	15642	
Shawville	1	Clearfield County	16873	
Shawwood Park	1	Butler County		
Shay	1	Armstrong County	16226	
Shaytown	1	Potter County		
Shazen	1	Cambria County		
Sheakleyville	1	Mercer County	16151	
Shearersburg	1	Westmoreland County	15656	
Sheatown	1	Luzerne County	18634	
Sheeder	1	Chester County	19475	
Sheerlund Forest	1	Berks County	19607	
Sheffer	1	York County		
Sheffield	1	Warren County	16347	
Sheffield Junction	1	Forest County		
Sheffield Township	1	Warren County		
Shehawken	1	Wayne County	18462	
Shelander Hollow	1	Warren County		
Shellsville	1	Dauphin County	17028	
Shelltown	1	Blair County		
Shelly	1	Bucks County	18951	
Shellytown	1	Blair County	16693	
Shelocta	1	Indiana County	15774	
Shelvey	1	Elk County	15846	
Shenandoah	1	Schuylkill County	17976	
Shenandoah Heights	1	Schuylkill County	17976	
Shenandoah Junction	1	Schuylkill County	17976	
Shenango	1	Mercer County	16125	
Shenango Township	1	Lawrence County		
Shenango Township	1	Mercer County		
Shenkel	1	Chester County	19464	
Shenks Ferry	1	York County	17309	
Shepherd Hills	1	Lehigh County		
Shepherdstown	1	Cumberland County	17055	
Sheppton	1	Schuylkill County	18248	
Sheppton-Oneida	1	Schuylkill County		
Sheraden	1	Allegheny County		
Sheridan	1	Lebanon County	17073	
Sheridan	1	Schuylkill County	17980	
Sherman	1	Wayne County	13754	
Shermans Dale	1	Perry County	17090	
Shermansville	1	Crawford County	16316	
Sherrett	1	Armstrong County	16218	
Sherwin	1	Butler County		
Sheshequin	1	Bradford County	18850	
Sheshequin Township	1	Bradford County		
Shetters Grove	1	York County	17405	
Shettleston	1	Centre County		
Shickshinny	1	Luzerne County	18655	
Shields	1	Allegheny County	15143	
Shieldsburg	1	Westmoreland County	15670	
Shillington	1	Berks County	19607	
Shiloh	1	Clearfield County		
Shiloh	1	York County	17404	
Shiloh East	1	York County	17405	
Shimersville	1	Northampton County		
Shimerville	1	Lehigh County	18049	
Shimpstown	1	Franklin County	17236	
Shindle	1	Mifflin County	17841	
Shinerville	1	Sullivan County		
Shingiss	1	Washington County		
Shinglebury	1	Tioga County		
Shinglehouse	1	Potter County	16748	
Shingletown	1	Centre County	16801	
Shintown	1	Clinton County	17764	
Shipmans Eddy	1	Warren County	16365	
Shippen Township	1	Cameron County		
Shippen Township	1	Tioga County		
Shippensburg	2	Cumberland County	17257	
Shippensburg	2	Franklin County	17257	
Shippensburg Township	1	Cumberland County		
Shippenville	1	Clarion County	16254	
Shippingport	1	Beaver County	15077	
Shire Oaks	1	Washington County		
Shiremanstown	1	Cumberland County	17011	
Shirks Corner	1	Montgomery County	19473	
Shirksville	1	Lebanon County		
Shirley Township	1	Huntingdon County		
Shirleysburg	1	Huntingdon County	17260	
Shoaf	1	Fayette County	15478	
Shoaf Ovens	1	Fayette County		
Shober	1	Somerset County		
Shocks Mills	1	Lancaster County	17547	
Shoemaker	1	Cambria County	15946	
Shoemakers	1	Monroe County	18301	
Shoemakers	1	Schuylkill County	17948	
Shoemakersville	1	Berks County	19555	
Shoenberger	1	Huntingdon County	16686	
Shoenersville	2	Lehigh County	18103	
Shoenersville	2	Northampton County	18103	
Shohola	1	Pike County	18458	
Shohola Falls	1	Pike County		
Shohola Township	1	Pike County		
Shope Gardens	1	Dauphin County	17057	
Shorbes Hill	1	York County	17331	
Short Run	1	Potter County		
Shortsville	1	Tioga County	16935	
Shousetown	1	Allegheny County		
Shrader	1	Mifflin County	17084	
Shreiners	1	Lancaster County		
Shreiners	1	Snyder County		
Shrewsbury	1	York County	17361	
Shrewsbury Township	1	Lycoming County		
Shrewsbury Township	1	Sullivan County		
Shrewsbury Township	1	York County		
Shumans	1	Columbia County	17815	
Shunk	1	Sullivan County	17768	
Shy Beaver	1	Huntingdon County	16610	
Sibleyville	1	Erie County		
Sickler Hill	1	Luzerne County		
Sickles Corner	1	Blair County	16601	
Siddonsburg	1	York County	17019	
Sidell	1	Clarion County		
Sides	1	Indiana County		
Sidley	1	Erie County		
Sidman	1	Cambria County	15955	
Sidney	1	Indiana County		
Siegfried	1	Northampton County	18067	
Sigel	1	Jefferson County	15860	
Siglerville	1	Mifflin County	17063	
Sigmund	1	Lehigh County	18092	
Sigsbee	1	Greene County	15338	
Siko	1	Wayne County		
Siles	1	Bucks County		
Silkworth	1	Luzerne County	18621	
Silvara	1	Bradford County	18623	
Silver Brook	1	Schuylkill County		
Silver Creek	1	Schuylkill County	17959	
Silver Ford Heights	1	Mifflin County	17066	
Silver Lake	1	Bucks County	18940	
Silver Lake	1	Susquehanna County	18812	
Silver Lake	1	York County	17339	
Silver Lake Township	1	Susquehanna County		
Silver Mills	1	Bedford County		
Silver Spring	1	Lancaster County	17575	
Silver Spring	1	Pike County		
Silver Spring Township	1	Cumberland County		
Silverbrook	1	Schuylkill County		
Silverdale	1	Bucks County	18962	
Silverton	1	Schuylkill County		
Silverville	1	Butler County	16055	
Simmonstown	1	Lancaster County	17527	
Simpson	1	Fayette County		
Simpson	1	Lackawanna County	18407	
Simpson	1	McKean County		
Simpson Store	1	Washington County	15377	
Sinclair	1	Westmoreland County		
Singersville	1	Dauphin County	17018	
Sinking Spring	1	Berks County	19608	
Sinking Valley	1	Blair County	16601	
Sinnamahoning	1	Cameron County	15861	
Sinnemahoning	1	Cameron County		
Sinsheim	1	York County	17362	
Siousca	1	Chester County		
Sipes Mill	1	Fulton County	17238	
Sipesville	1	Somerset County	15561	
Sistersville	1	Armstrong County		
Sitka	1	Fayette County		
Siverly	1	Venango County		
Six Mile Run	1	Bedford County	16679	
Six Points	1	Butler County	16049	
Sixtieth Street	1	Philadelphia County	19139	
Sizerville	1	Cameron County	15834	
