= Woxall, Pennsylvania =

Unincorporated community in Pennsylvania, US

Woxall Woxhall
- Village
- Location within Pennsylvania Location within the United States
- Coordinates: 40°18′38″N 75°26′55″W
- Country: United States
- State: Pennsylvania
- County: Montgomery
- Township: Upper Salford, Marlborough
- Founded: pre 1727 (as Kroppestettel)
- Established: 1888 as Woxall
- Named for: "Knocks All" partial slogan for an unknown soap brand

Area
  - Total: 1.6 sq mi (4.1 km^{2})
  - Land: 1.6 sq mi (4.1 km^{2})
  - Water: 0.0 sq mi (0 km^{2})
- Elevation: 420 ft (130 m)

Population (2010)
  - Total: 1,318
  - Density: 820/sq mi (320/km^{2})
- Time zone: UTC-5 (EST)
  - Summer (DST): UTC-4 (EDT)
- ZIP codes: 18979, 19438
- Area codes: 215, 267 and 445
- Website: uppersalfordtownship.org

Woxall or sometimes Woxhall is a census-designated place (CDP) in Montgomery County, Pennsylvania, United States. As of 2020 the majority of the CDP is in the Upper Salford Township, while a small portion is in Marlborough Township.

It is located on the eastern side of the Perkiomen Creek, which flows south into the Schuylkill River. The population was 1,318 at the 2010 census. The CDP is served by the Harleysville post office, with the zip code of 19438.

The village of Woxall was originally known as Kroppestettel, which in Pennsylvania Dutch means Crowtown. The village was later named Mechanicsville. By the end of the eighteenth century, the town contained a hotel and restaurant, town hall, shoe shop, wheelwright, and 12 homes. The village kept the name Mechanicsville until 1888, when a post office was established. A new name needed to be selected for the post office because another Pennsylvania town had the same name. After much discussion, residents submitted the name Noxall, "Knocks All" to postal authorities. The name had been read on the side of a bar of a box of soap in the village store. Evidently, they misread the "N" for a "W" and approved the name Woxall for the post office.

The Village of Woxall grew up near the Old Goshenhoppen Church, erected in 1744, where Lutheran and Reformed congregations met. With the arrival of the railroad in 1868, Salfordville, which prospered without railroad or trolley, grew around an old inn. By 1877, it contained a post office, general store, cigar factory, and 19 homes.

Other villages include Bergey, known in 1893 as Branchville, and Salford, called Rudy in the early 1900s. These two villages, along with Woxall and Salfordville, were noted for their general stores that sold a variety of items including fine clocks, furniture, barrel molasses, and quilting thread.

Woxall can be classified as a rural area, featuring agriculture fields, woods, and some housing developments which have been built since 2002.

The U.S. Census Bureau began defining the CDP for the 2010 U.S. census. At that time, the bureau only defined Woxall CDP as being in Upper Salford Township. The bureau changed the CDP boundary for the 2020 U.S. census.

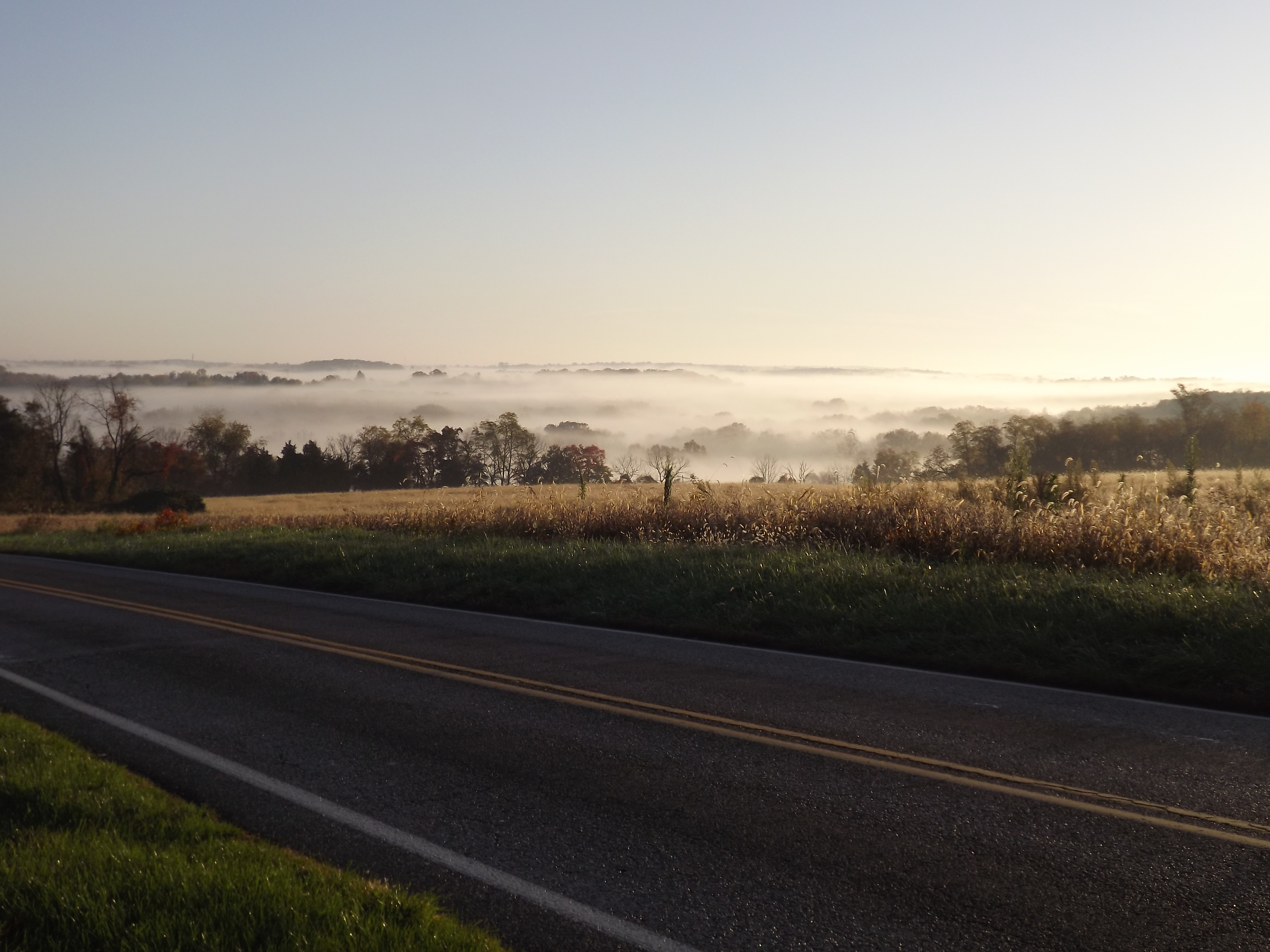
Woxall sunrise

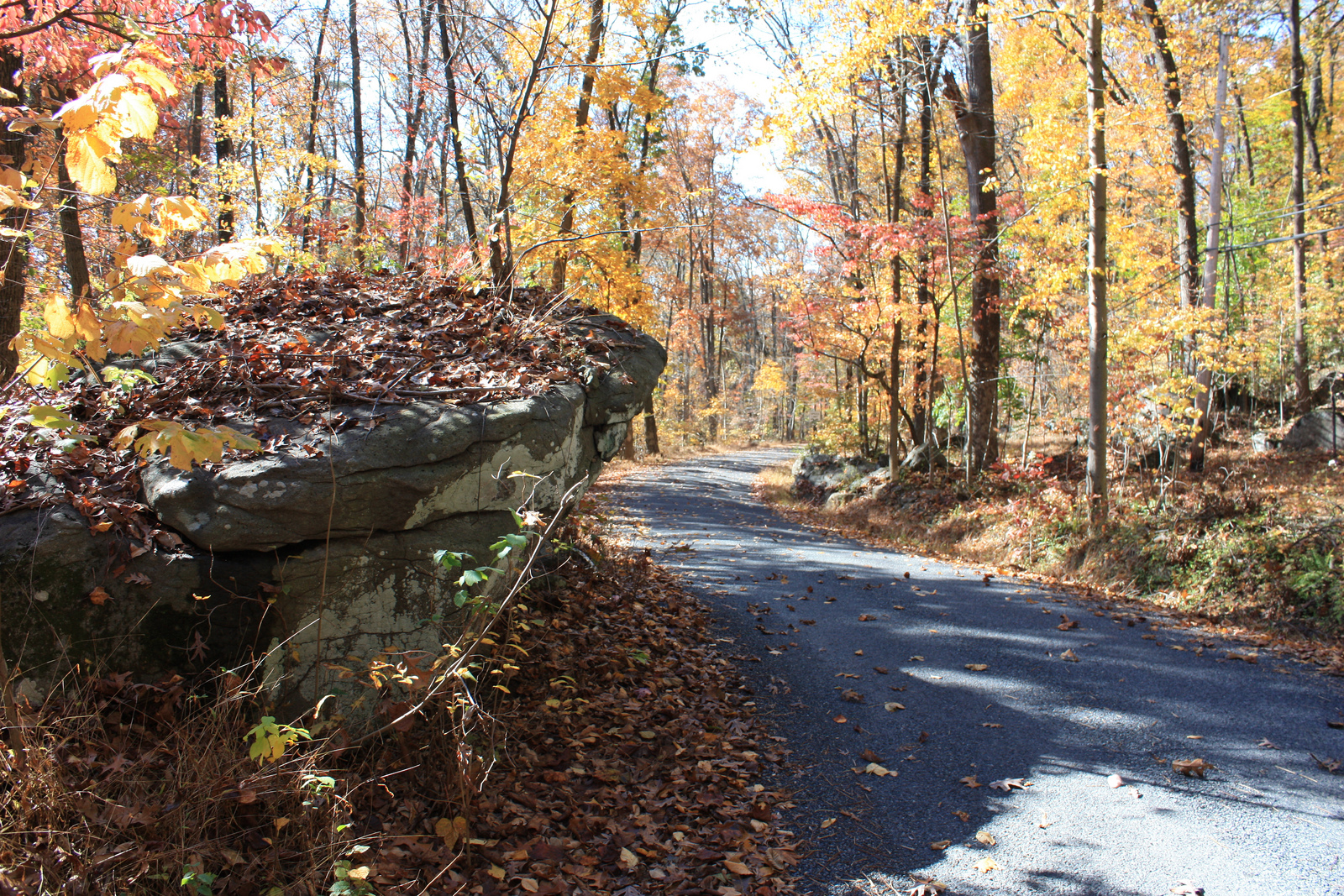
Hill Road

== Education ==
Portions of the CDP in Upper Salford Township are in the Souderton Area School District. Portions in Marlborough Township are in the Upper Perkiomen School District.
