= Sandy Run =

Sandy Run may refer to a location in the United States:

- Sandy Run (Twin Creek), Ohio, site of Brubaker Covered Bridge
- Sandy Run, Bedford County, Pennsylvania, an unincorporated community
- Sandy Run, Luzerne County, Pennsylvania, an unincorporated community
- Sandy Run (Wissahickon Creek), a stream in Pennsylvania
- Sandy Run (West Virginia), a stream in Pennsylvania
  - Sandy Run Middle School, part of Upper Dublin School District
- Sandy Run, South Carolina, an unincorporated community
- Sandy Run (Occoquan River tributary), a stream in Fairfax County, Virginia
