= Souderton Area High School =

Location
- 625 Lower Road; Souderton Area School District; Souderton, Montgomery County, PA 18964; United States; 40°18′52″N 75°18′52″W

Information
- Type: Public
- Opened: 2009 (New Building) 1931(Original Building)
- School district: Souderton Area School District
- Principal: Sam Varano
- Teaching staff: 127.45 (FTE)
- Enrollment: 2,132 (2023-2024)
- Student to teacher ratio: 16.73
- Colors: Red and White
- Slogan: Great History, Exceptional Future
- Fight song: Victory March
- Athletics conference: Suburban One Sports
- Sports: Fall Sports: Football, Soccer, Water Polo, Volleyball, Cross Country, Field Hockey, Golf, Tennis, Cheerleading. Winter Sports: Basketball, Swimming, Diving, Indoor Track, Wrestling. Spring Sports: Baseball, Softball, Lacrosse, Tennis, Track, Unified Bocce, Volleyball
- Mascot: "Big Red"
- Nickname: Soudy
- Team name: Indians/Big Red
- Rival: North Penn High School
- Newspaper: The Arrowhead
- Website: Souderton Area High School

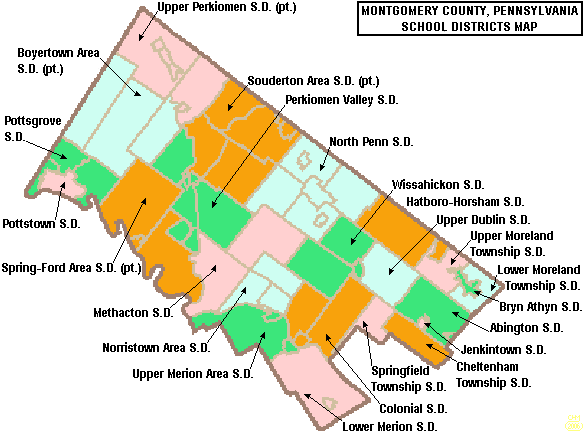
Souderton Area School District region in Montgomery County

Souderton Area High School is a large public high school in the Montgomery County suburbs of Philadelphia located at 625 Lower Road in Souderton, Pennsylvania, United States, and serves residents in Souderton and Telford boroughs, and Franconia, Lower Salford and Upper Salford townships. It is the only high school in Souderton Area School District.

== Extracurriculars ==
The district offers a variety of clubs, activities and sports. There are currently 75 different clubs students can join.

== Notable alumni ==
- 1965: Donald Haldeman, 1976 Summer Olympics gold medalist in trapshooting
- 1975: Alex McArthur, film and television actor; appeared in Madonna's "Papa Don't Preach" video
- 1981: Jamie Moyer, pitcher for eight Major League Baseball teams from 1986-2012. 2008 World Series champion with the Philadelphia Phillies. Oldest MLB pitcher to win a game.
- 1982: Steven Grasse advertising distiller founder/owner of Gyro Worldwide and Art in the Age of Mechanical Reproduction
- 1984: Jon Wurster Drummer for Superchunk, The Mountain Goats, & Bob Mould and comedian with Scharpling and Wurster
- 1986: Rob Kampia, Marijuana activist
- 1988: Steven Stefanowicz Private military contractor at Abu Ghraib prison. Accused of ordering abusive interrogations some have labeled torture.
- 1989: Jared Hasselhoff, actor, moderator, radio host and Bloodhound Gang bass player
- 1997: Michael Joseph "Spanky G" Guthier. Former drummer for popular comedy rock group The Bloodhound Gang
- 2003: Amy Mensch. Mechanical engineer and combustion scientist at NIST.
- 2009: Jake Metz former Defensive End for the Buffalo Bills and former Arena Football League player for the Philadelphia Soul
