= Salford (disambiguation) =

Salford a city in Greater Manchester, England.

Salford may also refer to:

== In Greater Manchester ==
- City of Salford, a metropolitan borough with city status
- Salford (UK Parliament constituency)
- County Borough of Salford, a local government district 1844–1974
- Salford Hundred, or Salfordshire, a former subdivision of the historic county of Lancashire
- Diocese of Salford, of the Catholic Church
- Salford (speedway), a former motorcycle racing team
- Salford City F.C., a football club

== Other places named Salford ==
- Salford, Ontario, in South-West Oxford, Ontario, Canada
- Salford, Bedfordshire, England
- Salford, Oxfordshire, England
- Salford, Pennsylvania, United States
- Salford Township, Pennsylvania, United States

== See also ==
- Salford Central (disambiguation)
- Salfords, a village in Surrey, England
- Salford Priors, a village in the Warwickshire, England
