= Souderton Area School District =

School district in Pennsylvania

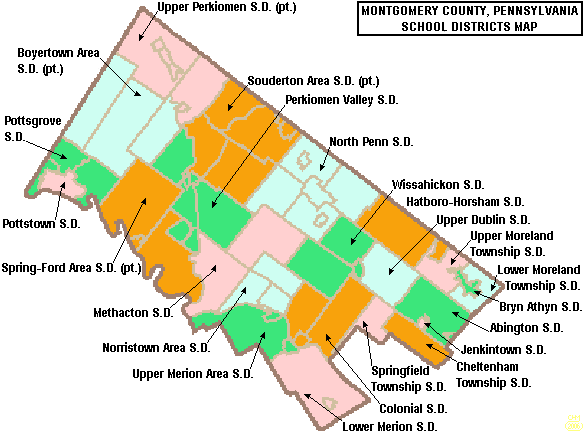

Address
- 760 Lower Road Souderton, Pennsylvania, 18964; United States

District information
- Type: Public
- Grades: K-12
- Superintendent: Dr. Frank Gallagher
- Budget: $9,541,144 USD in 2016
- Enrolment: 6862 pupils in 2011

Other information
- Website: soudertonsd.org

Souderton Area School District is a large, suburban public school district which covers an area of almost 50 square miles (130 km^{2}) in the Montgomery County and Bucks County suburbs of Philadelphia. The district serves the municipalities of Souderton, Telford, Franconia, Lower Salford, Upper Salford, and Salford. By 2021, the population of the district was 47,277. The Souderton Area School District operates 3 secondary schools and 6 elementary schools. A new high school was built on Lower Road and was occupied in September 2009.

The teachers union for the Souderton Area School District went on strike on Tuesday, September 2, 2008. The dispute was over wages and health-care benefits, among other things. The strike ended September 25, 2008 with the Teachers' Union's acceptance of a nonbinding arbitration report proposed by the Souderton Area School Board.

== Schools ==
=== Secondary ===
- Souderton Area High School
- Indian Crest Middle School
- Indian Valley Middle School

=== Elementary ===
- E. Merton Crouthamel (EMC)
- Franconia
- Lower Salford (closed in June 2013)
- Oak Ridge
- Salford Hills
- Vernfield
- West Broad Street

== Academic achievement ==
Souderton Area School District was ranked 51st out of 498 Pennsylvania school districts in 2012 by the Pittsburgh Business Times. The ranking was based on five years of student academic performance on the PSSAs for: reading, writing, math and three years of science.

- 2011 - 46th
- 2010 - 40th
- 2009 - 40th
- 2008 - 49th
- 2007 - 54th out of 501 Pennsylvania school districts.

In 2009, the academic achievement, of the students in the Souderton Area School District, was in the 91st percentile among all 500 Pennsylvania school districts Scale (0–99; 100 is state best)

=== Graduation rate ===
In 2011, the graduation rate was 98.7%. In 2010, the Pennsylvania Department of Education issued a new, 4-year cohort graduation rate. Souderton Area School District's rate was 94% for 2010.

Under former calculation formula:

- 2010 - 96%
- 2009 - 96%
- 2008 - 95%
- 2007 - 97%

=== High school ===
In 2011 the school achieves AYP status. In 2010 the school was in Making Progress: School Improvement Level II due to chronic, low student achievement.

11th Grade Reading

- 2011 - 88.2% on grade level (% below basic). State - 69.1% of 11th graders are on grade level.
- 2010 - 82.1% on grade level (6.4% below basic). In Pennsylvania, 66% of 11th graders are on grade level.
- 2009 - 80.1% (8.3% below basic), State - 65%
- 2008 - 82.1% (7.5% below basic), State - 65%

11th Grade Math:

- 2011 - 85.6% on grade level (4.7% below basic). In Pennsylvania, 60.3% of 11th graders are on grade level.
- 2010 - 83.9% (5.9% below basic). State - 59%
- 2009 - 73.2% (11.2% below basic). State - 56%.
- 2008 - 74.5% (11.6% below basic), State - 56%

11th Grade Science:

- 2011 - 67.1% on grade level (4.5% below basic). State - 40% of 11th graders were on grade level.
- 2010 - 54.3% (9.5% below basic). State - 39%
- 2009 - 66.1% (4.5% below basic). State - 40%
- 2008 - 55% (8% below basic). State - 39%

== School Board ==
Souderton Area School District is governed by a nine-member board of school directors. School directors serve four-year terms. The board members are:

- Ken R. Keith, President
- Stephen Nelson, Vice President
- Michael Taylor, CPA - Secretary
- Elisa Ball - Treasurer
- Michael Barnacz
- Nicholas A. Braccio
- William J. Brong
- Janet Flisak
- William A. Formica III
- Andrew Landis
- Kimberly Wheeler

=== Formica controversy ===
In August 2024, board member Bill Formica made a series of social media posts suggesting that presidential candidate Kamala Harris "had engaged in sex acts to further her political career". Formica was met with backlash from the community and a Change.org petition urging him to resign.
