= Saulsbury =

Saulsbury may refer to:

- Saulsbury, Tennessee
- Saulsbury, West Virginia

== People with the name Saulsbury ==
- Eli Saulsbury (1817–1893), American lawyer and politician
- Gove Saulsbury (1815–1881), American physician and politician
- Willard Saulsbury Jr. (1861–1927), American lawyer and politician
- Willard Saulsbury Sr. (1820–1892), American lawyer and politician, father of Willard Saulsbury Jr.

== See also ==
- Saulsburg, Pennsylvania
