= Landis Homestead =

Historic house in Pennsylvania, United States

- U.S. National Register of Historic Places
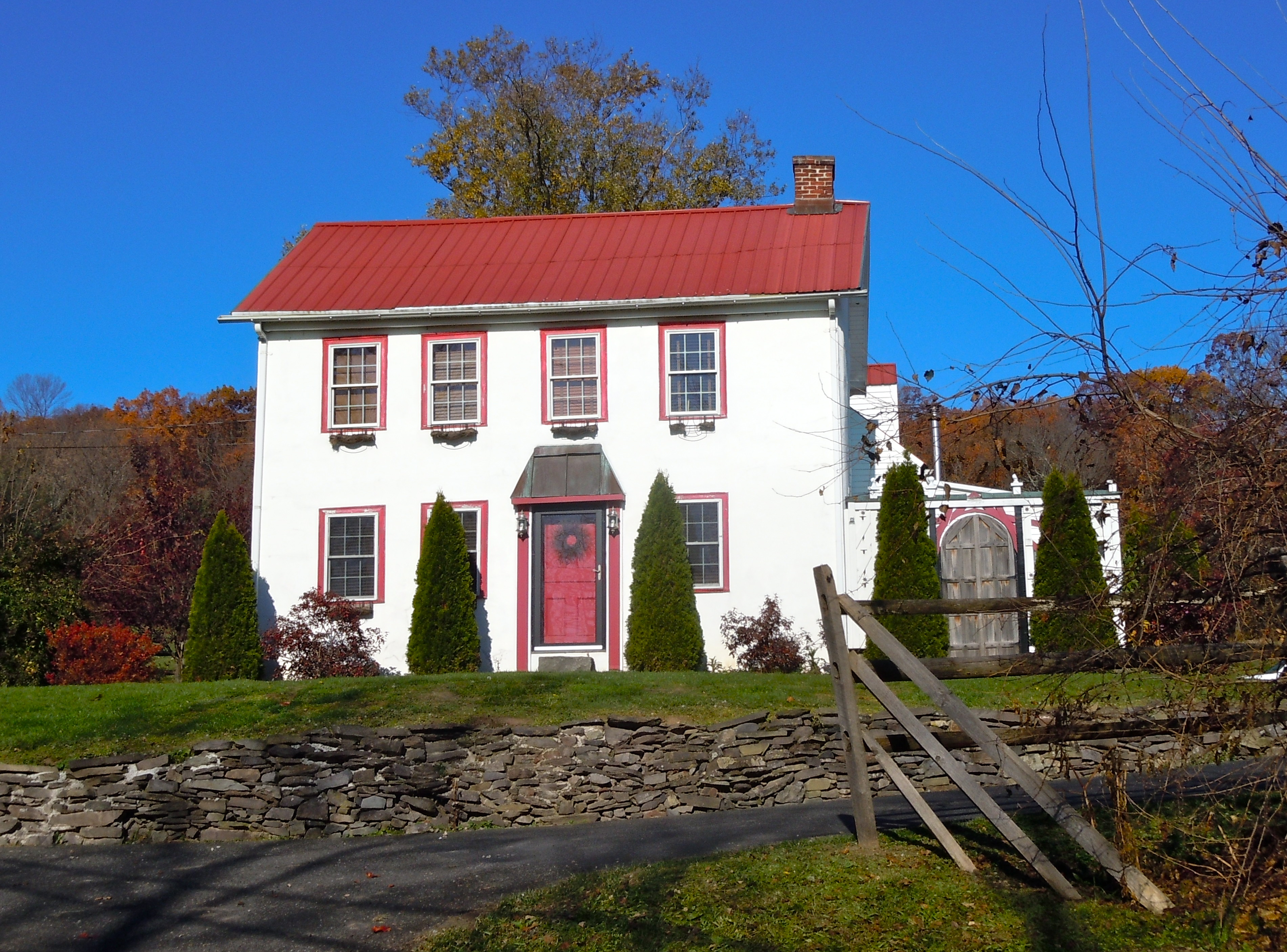
- Landis Homestead, November 2011

- Location within Pennsylvania Location within the United States
- Location: Southwest of Tylersport off Pennsylvania Route 563 on Morwood Road, Salford Township, Pennsylvania
- Coordinates: 40°19′11″N 75°24′40″W
- Area: 21.8 acres (8.8 ha)
- Built: 1839
- NRHP reference No.: 73001654
- Added to NRHP: October 10, 1973

Landis Homestead, also known as the Morris Jarrett Farm, is a historic home located near Tylersport in Salford Township, Montgomery County, Pennsylvania. The main farm house was built in 1839, and is a 2 1/2-story, four bay by two bay, stucco over stone dwelling. It has a medium pitched gable roof. Also on the property is a contributing barn.

It was added to the National Register of Historic Places in 1973.
