= Samuel Gottschall =

American fraktur artist

Samuel Godshall (Born Samuel Kindig Gottschall, November 11, 1808–February 14 1898) was an American fraktur artist.

Born into a family of teachers, Gottschall was a resident of the Mennonite community of Franconia, Pennsylvania. His father, Jacob Gottschall, was a preacher and bishop as well as a sometime teacher; with his students he produced books of musical notation. Three of Samuel's siblings were educators as well; one, Martin, also produced fraktur. Neither of the two signed his work, and it is difficult to tell the two apart; their paintings have become popular among collectors because of the colors and imagery employed in their creation. Neither of the two men married; they worked as millers after the end of their teaching careers, operating a property on Perkiomen Creek in Salford. Samuel was a weaver as well, and among his surviving documents are his weaver's record book and weather diary, both of which have proven instrumental in identifying his work.

Surviving frakturs from Gottschall date to the years 1833 to 1836, and do not appear to postdate his teaching career. Several of his works are in the collection of the Mennonite Heritage Center. Others are owned by the Philadelphia Museum of Art, the Free Library of Philadelphia and the American Folk Art Museum. Gottschall's style inspired other artists, including John Derstine Souder.
