= Black Gut =

Channel in Pennsylvania, USA

Coordinates: 40.074°N 76.676°W

Black Gut (known locally as "The Gut") is a 1.4-mile-long (2.3 km) distributary connecting the Susquehanna River to Hartman Run in York County, Pennsylvania in the United States.

It was formerly a southeast flowing branch of the Conewago Creek bifurcation where it had once separated Brunner and Lowe's Island from mainland York County in East Manchester Township, joining the Susquehanna at the village of Saginaw. This delta no longer exists due to expansion of the Brunner Island Steam Electric Station.

Another branch, known as the River Gut, ran 0.5 miles (0.80 km) from the gut to the Susquehanna. This branch had separated Brunner and Lowe's Island before it was eventually filled in, joining both islands into one.

== See also ==
- List of rivers of Pennsylvania
- Conewago Creek (west)
