= Bridge in Franconia Township =

- U.S. National Register of Historic Places
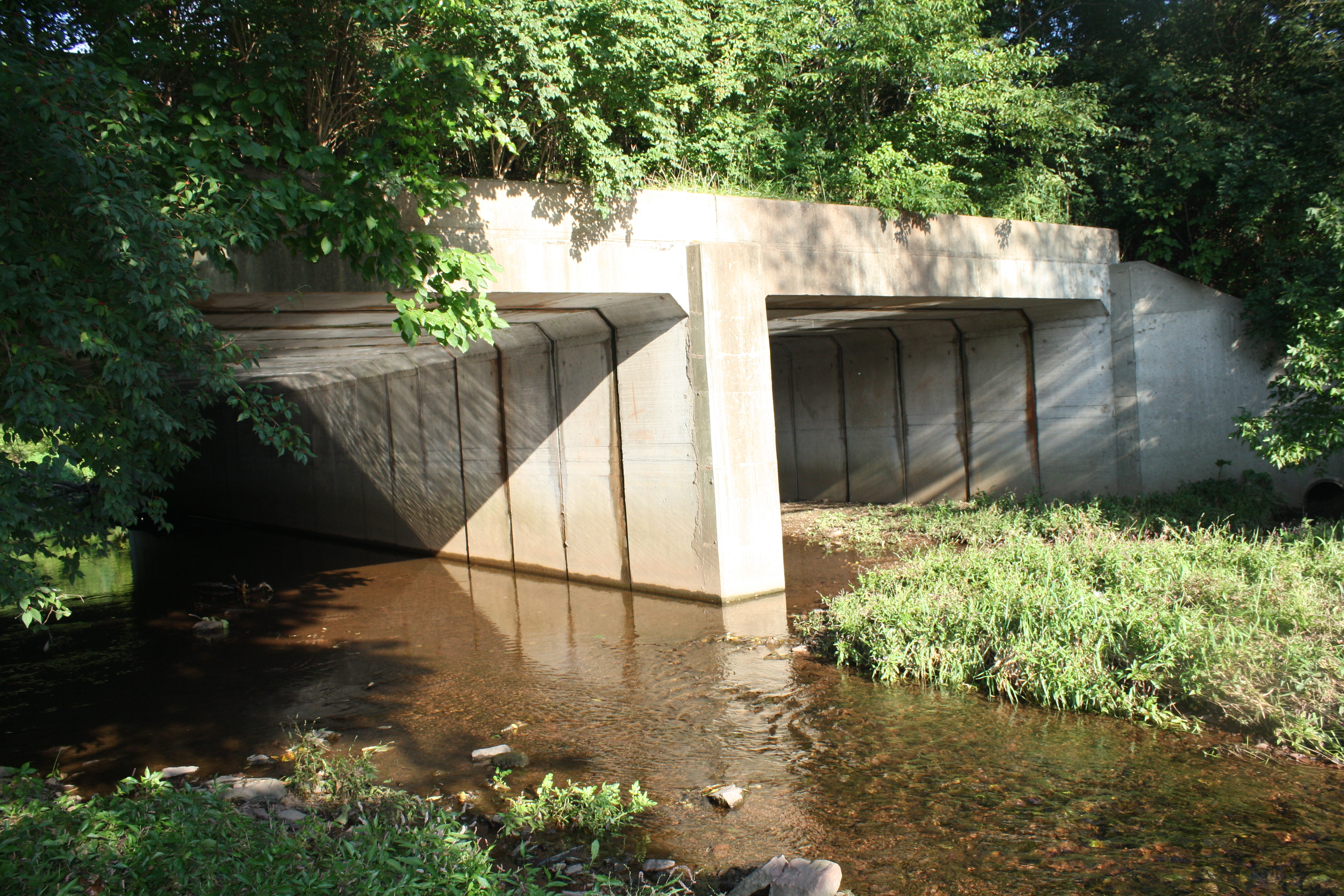
- Bridge on Allentown Road (Franconia, PA) over Skippack Creek. September 2012.

- Location within Pennsylvania Location within the United States
- Location: Allentown Road over Skippack Creek, Elvoy, Franconia Township, Pennsylvania
- Coordinates: 40°17′19″N 75°20′19″W
- Area: less than one acre
- Built: 1837, 1874
- Architectural style: Multi-span stone arch
- MPS: Highway Bridges Owned by the Commonwealth of Pennsylvania, Department of Transportation TR
- NRHP reference No.: 88000856
- Added to NRHP: June 22, 1988

Bridge in Franconia Township is a historic stone arch bridge spanning Skippack Creek at Elvoy in Franconia Township, Montgomery County, Pennsylvania. The bridge was built in 1837 and reconstructed in 1874. It has two 20-foot-long (6.1 m) spans with an overall length of 100-foot (30 m).

The bridge was listed on the National Register of Historic Places in 1988.

== See also ==
- List of bridges documented by the Historic American Engineering Record in Pennsylvania
