= Bergy Bridge Historic District =

Historic district in Pennsylvania, United States

- U.S. National Register of Historic Places
- U.S. Historic district
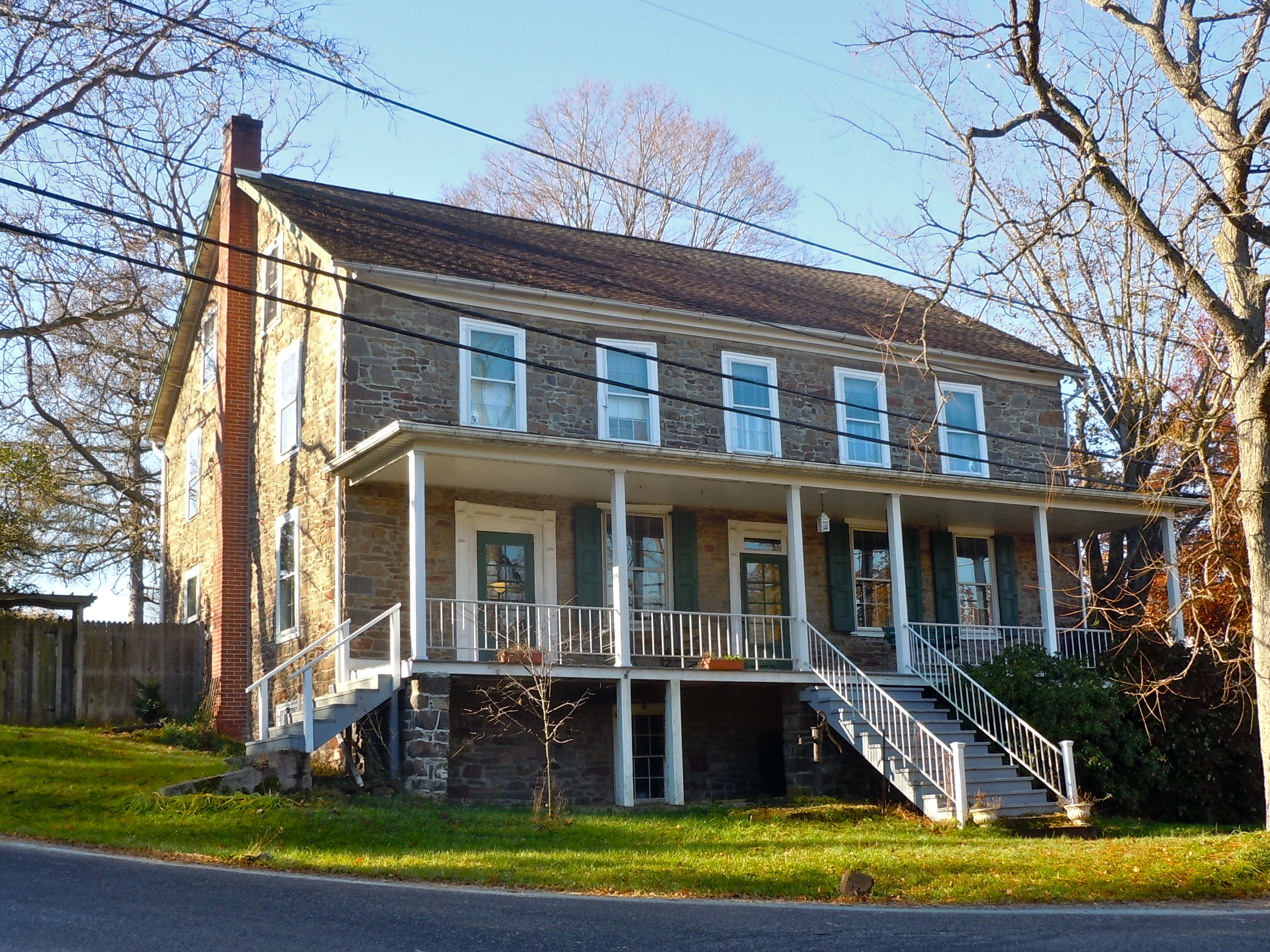
- House in Bergy Bridge Historic District, November 2011

- Location within Pennsylvania Location within the United States
- Location: Northwest of Harleysville off Pennsylvania Route 63, Upper Salford Township, Pennsylvania
- Coordinates: 40°18′08″N 75°25′21″W
- Area: 30 acres (12 ha)
- Built: 1848
- NRHP reference No.: 73001644
- Added to NRHP: October 10, 1973

Bergy Bridge Historic District is a national historic district located near Harleysville in Upper Salford Township, Montgomery County, Pennsylvania. It encompasses four contributing buildings and two contributing structures. They are the Bergy Stone Arch Bridge (1848), Kratz House and Barn (c. 1861), German garden, Bergy Inn, and Stable Building.

It was added to the National Register of Historic Places in 1973.
