= Skippack Creek =

Coordinates: 40.24042°N 75.36878°W

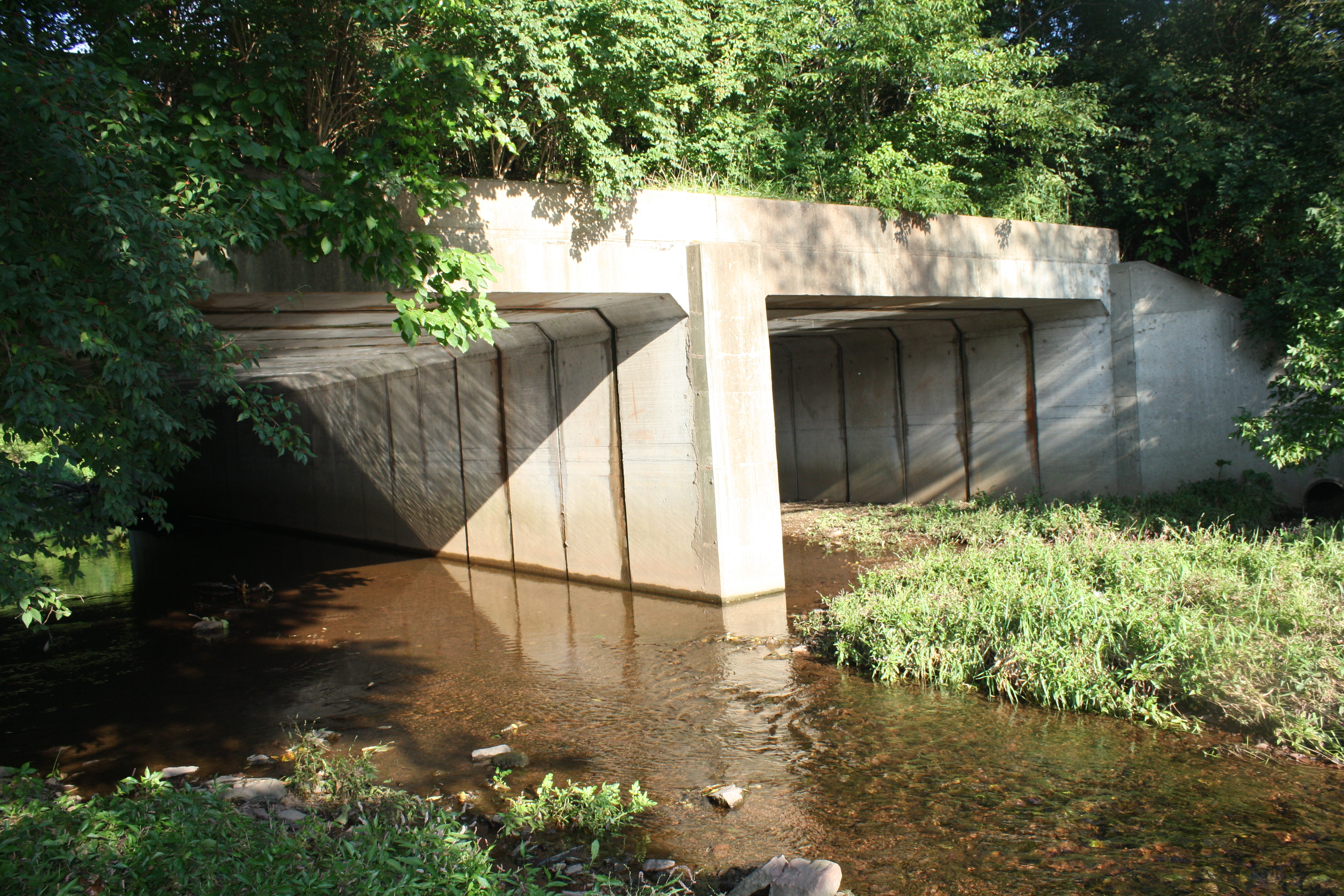
Historic Bridge on Allentown Road (Franconia Township, PA) over Skippack Creek.

Skippack Creek is a 15.7-mile-long (25.3 km) tributary of Perkiomen Creek in Montgomery County, Pennsylvania in the United States. Skippack Creek joins Perkiomen Creek approximately 3 miles (5 km) upstream of that creek's confluence with the Schuylkill River.

A portion of the creek flows through Evansburg State Park and passes by the census-designated place of Skippack.

Skippack is a Native American name purported to mean "a pool of stagnant water".

It is stocked with brown and rainbow trout; other fish in the creek include smallmouth bass, catfish, sucker, carp, panfish, and freshwater eel.

== See also ==
- List of rivers of Pennsylvania
