= Franconia, Pennsylvania =

Unincorporated community in Pennsylvania, US

- Unincorporated community
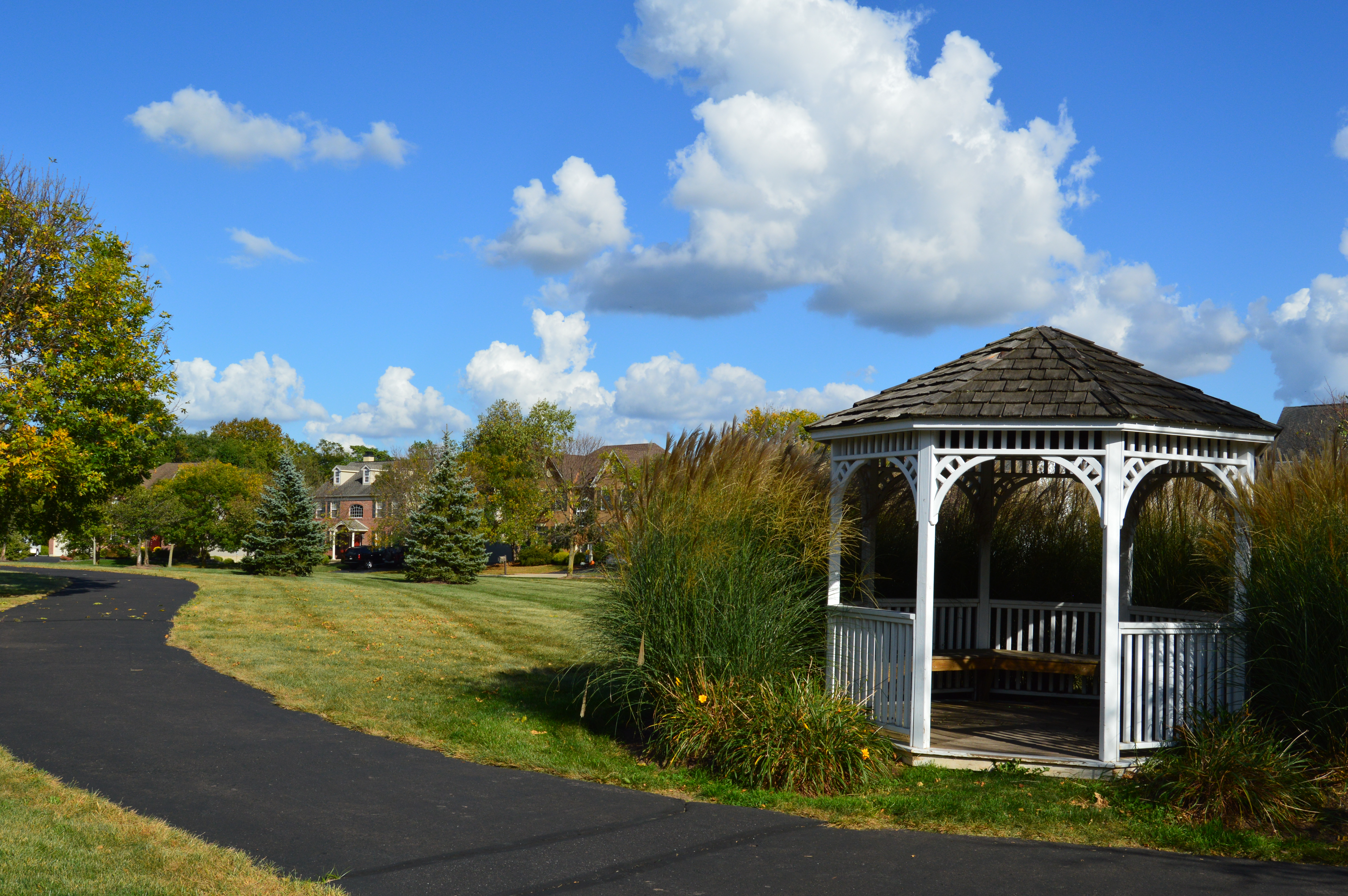
- Cambridge Reserve in Franconia

- Location within Pennsylvania
- Coordinates: 40°18′28″N 75°21′28″W
- Country: United States
- State: Pennsylvania
- County: Montgomery
- Township: Franconia
- Elevation: 394 ft (120 m)
- Time zone: UTC-5 (Eastern (EST))
  - Summer (DST): UTC-4 (EDT)
- Area codes: 215, 267 and 445
- GNIS feature ID: 1203621

Franconia is an unincorporated community in Franconia Township in Montgomery County, Pennsylvania, United States. Franconia is located at the intersection of Pennsylvania Route 113 and Allentown Road.

Franconia opened its first Elementary School in December 1941. Franconia Elementary celebrated its 75th anniversary on October 6, 2016, with alumni returning to share the event with current students. A time capsule, containing memories of past students, was also opened,

The village is named after Franconia, the English (and Latin) term for Franken, a region in Germany.

== Notable people ==
- Samuel Gottschall, fraktur artist
