= Tylersport, Pennsylvania =

Unincorporated community in Pennsylvania, US

- Unincorporated community
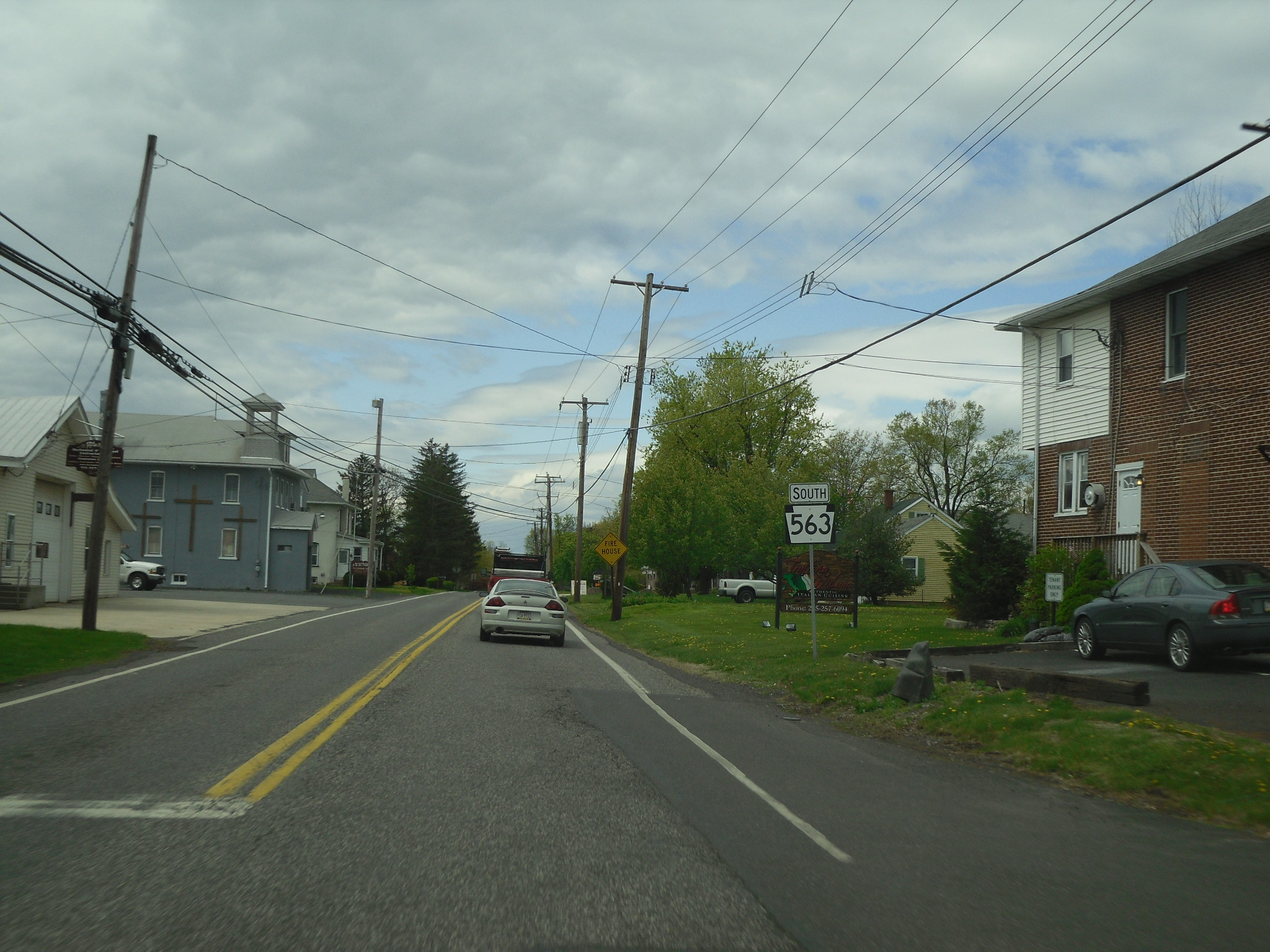
- PA 563 in Tylersport

- Location within Pennsylvania
- Coordinates: 40°20′58″N 75°22′52″W
- Country: United States
- State: Pennsylvania
- County: Montgomery
- Township: Salford
- Elevation: 558 ft (170 m)
- Time zone: UTC-5 (Eastern (EST))
  - Summer (DST): UTC-4 (EDT)
- ZIP code: 18971
- Area codes: 215, 267 and 445
- GNIS feature ID: 1190050

Tylersport is an unincorporated community in Salford Township in Montgomery County, Pennsylvania, United States. Tylersport is located at the intersection of Pennsylvania Route 563 and Allentown Road.
