= Salford Central =

Salford Central may refer to the following in Salford, Greater Manchester, England:

- Salford Central railway station
- Salford Central F.C., now Salford City F.C., a football club

== See also ==
- Salford (disambiguation)
