= Earlington, Pennsylvania =

Unincorporated community in Pennsylvania, US

- Unincorporated community
- Location within Pennsylvania
- Coordinates: 40°19′15″N 75°22′21″W
- Country: United States
- State: Pennsylvania
- County: Montgomery
- Township: Franconia
- Elevation: 374 ft (114 m)
- Time zone: UTC-5 (Eastern (EST))
  - Summer (DST): UTC-4 (EDT)
- ZIP code: 18918
- Area codes: 215, 267 and 445
- GNIS feature ID: 1173712

Earlington is an unincorporated community in Franconia Township in Montgomery County, Pennsylvania, United States. Earlington is located at the intersection of Allentown Road and Morwood Road. The Pinball Parlour is located on Allentown Road in Earlington.
