= Sandy Run, Bedford County, Pennsylvania =

Unincorporated community in Pennsylvania, US

Sandy Run, Pennsylvania
- Unincorporated community
- Location within Pennsylvania Location within the United States
- Coordinates: 40°07′18″N 78°13′49″W
- Country: United States
- State: Pennsylvania
- County: Bedford
- Elevation: 1,424 ft (434 m)
- Time zone: UTC-5 (Eastern (EST))
  - Summer (DST): UTC-4 (EDT)
- Area code: 814
- GNIS feature ID: 1197685

Sandy Run is an unincorporated community in Broad Top Township, Bedford County, Pennsylvania, United States.
