= Santiago, Pennsylvania =

Unincorporated community in Pennsylvania, US

- Unincorporated community
- Location within Pennsylvania Location within the United States
- Coordinates: 40°26′03″N 80°16′14″W
- Country: United States
- State: Pennsylvania
- County: Allegheny
- Elevation: 1,099 ft (335 m)
- Time zone: UTC-5 (Eastern (EST))
  - Summer (DST): UTC-4 (EDT)
- Area code: 724
- GNIS feature ID: 1186977

Santiago (also North Star) is an unincorporated community in North Fayette Township, Allegheny County, Pennsylvania, United States.
