= Seger, Pennsylvania =

Unincorporated community in Pennsylvania, US

Seger
- Unincorporated community
- Location within the state of Pennsylvania Seger (the United States)
- Coordinates: 40°21′54″N 79°17′7″W
- Country: United States
- State: Pennsylvania
- County: Westmoreland
- Elevation: 1,122 ft (342 m)
- Time zone: UTC-5 (Eastern (EST))
  - Summer (DST): UTC-4 (EDT)
- GNIS feature ID: 1187225

Seger is an unincorporated community and coal town in Westmoreland County, Pennsylvania, United States.
