= Sandy Run (West Virginia) =

Stream in West Virginia, U.S.

Coordinates: 39°23′45″N 80°46′08″W

Sandy Run is a stream in the U.S. state of West Virginia.

Sandy Run The creek possibly was named after Jennie Sandy, a pioneer who settled there.

== See also ==
- List of rivers of West Virginia
