= Seamentown, Pennsylvania =

Coordinates: 40°42′35″N 78°55′45″W

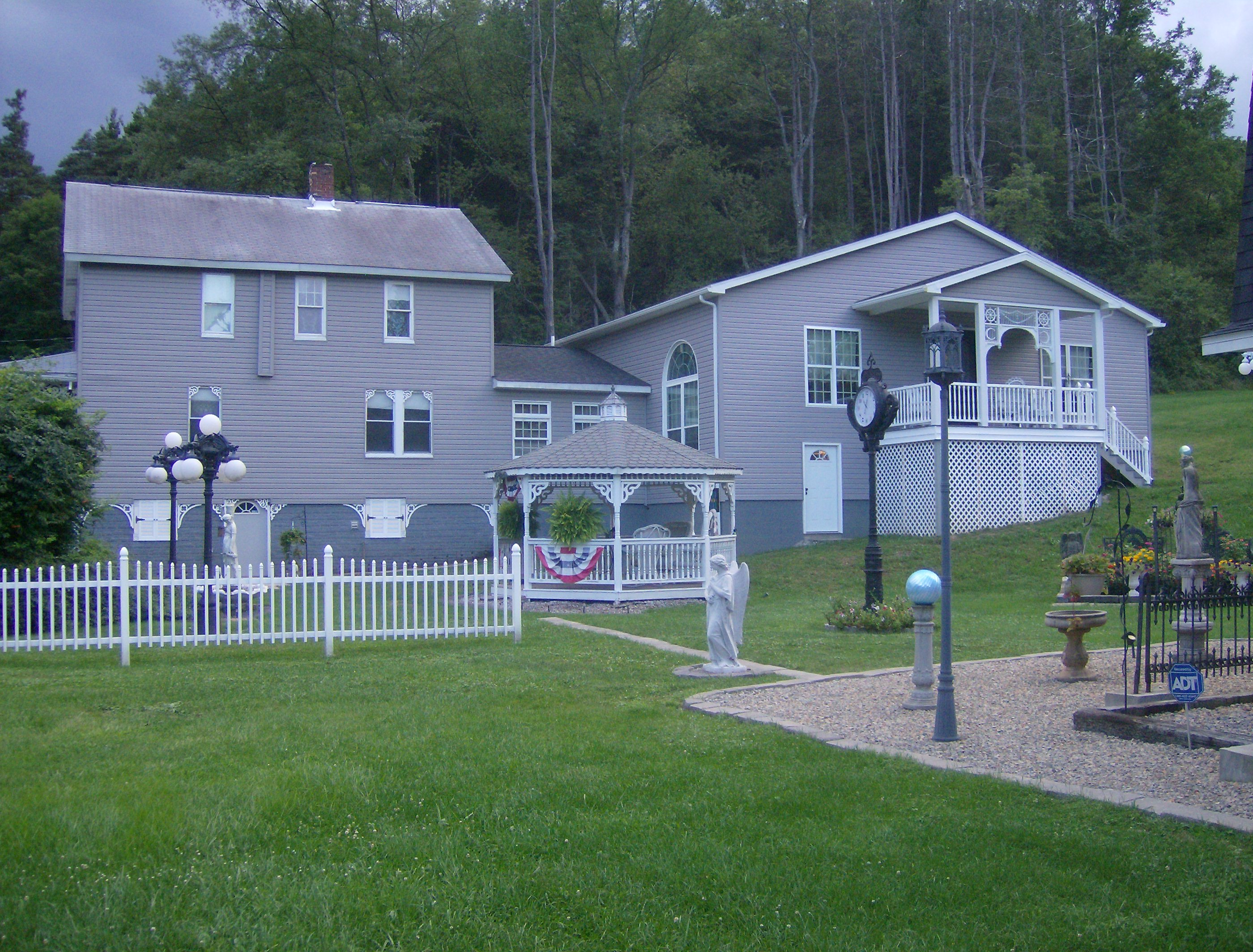

Seamentown, Pennsylvania is a small community approximately 1 mile east of Commodore, Pennsylvania. The 2 towns are separated by an old bony pile from the old Commodore mines. It is located in Green Township in Indiana County. The town is unmarked on many maps. Up until the middle of the 1950s, Seamentown had a bar as you entered the town from Commodore, and a general store that locals would frequent. Many of the homes in Seamentown were built by a man with the last name Seamen, thus the town was named after him. In 2016 the town had 20 homes in it. A railroad runs along the town's edge parallel to Vanderbilt Street which is the town's main road and only access.
