= Scab Hill, Pennsylvania =

Unincorporated community in Pennsylvania, US

Scab Hill
- Unincorporated community
- Location within the state of Pennsylvania Scab Hill (the United States)
- Coordinates: 40°19′21″N 79°43′00″W
- Country: United States
- State: Pennsylvania
- County: Westmoreland
- Elevation: 1,086 ft (331 m)
- Time zone: UTC-5 (Eastern (EST))
  - Summer (DST): UTC-4 (EDT)
- GNIS feature ID: 1187054

Scab Hill is an unincorporated community and coal town in Westmoreland County, Pennsylvania, United States. It was also known as Adams Hill.
