= Salfordville, Pennsylvania =

Unincorporated community in Pennsylvania, US

- Unincorporated community
- Location within Pennsylvania
- Coordinates: 40°17′36″N 75°25′59″W
- Country: United States
- State: Pennsylvania
- County: Montgomery
- Township: Upper Salford
- Elevation: 381 ft (116 m)
- Time zone: UTC-5 (Eastern (EST))
  - Summer (DST): UTC-4 (EDT)
- ZIP code: 18958
- Area codes: 610 and 484
- GNIS feature ID: 1202455

Salfordville is an unincorporated community in Upper Salford Township in Montgomery County, Pennsylvania, United States. Salfordville is located at the intersection of Old Skippack Road and Wolford Road/Bergey Road.
