= Saulsbury, West Virginia =

Saulsbury
- Unincorporated community
- Location within the state of West Virginia Saulsbury (the United States)
- Coordinates: 39°7′21″N 81°32′36″W
- Country: United States
- State: West Virginia
- County: Wood
- Elevation: 630 ft (190 m)
- Time zone: UTC-5 (Eastern (EST))
  - Summer (DST): UTC-4 (EDT)
- GNIS ID: 1555575

Saulsbury is an unincorporated community in Wood County, West Virginia, United States.
