= Sipesville, Pennsylvania =

Unincorporated community in Pennsylvania, US

- Unincorporated community
- Location within Pennsylvania
- Coordinates: 40°05′57″N 79°05′28″W
- Country: United States
- State: Pennsylvania
- County: Somerset
- Elevation: 2,067 ft (630 m)
- Time zone: UTC-5 (Eastern (EST))
  - Summer (DST): UTC-4 (EDT)
- ZIP code: 15561
- Area code: 814
- GNIS feature ID: 1187728

Sipesville is an unincorporated community that is located in Somerset County, Pennsylvania, United States. It is located on Pennsylvania Route 985, 6.3 miles (10.1 km) north of the Borough of Somerset.

== History ==
Sipesville is named for Michael Sipe, who opened a mercantile business in 1843.

Sipesville has a post office, with ZIP code 15561, which opened on April 9, 1851; Levi Hoffman was the first postmaster. On July 15, 1853, Peter Sipe was appointed as Hoffman's successor; he went on to hold the position of U.S. Postmaster until July 1, 1882.

=== 1860-1899 ===
By early 1860, under the leadership of Postmaster Peter Sipe, mail between Somerset and Johnstown was being delivered three times per week through Sipesville.

During the summer of 1866, Sipesville resident Aaron Casebeer was awarded a patent by the U.S. Patent Office for improvements made to a machine for jointing staves." The next year, Henry Sipes was awarded a patent for sleigh brakes.

By 1877, The Somerset Herald was describing the town as a "peaceful hamlet" and "city set on a hill, where dogs never fight, street cars never collide, thieves do not break through and stear, and people never dye" [sic]. The newspaper also noted that "the large store of P.A. Sipe ... supplies this vicinity with everything a first-class merchant deals in," that "Michael Sipe ... survived the exciting campaign of '76," that the town now had its own public school, that the Casebeer Church, which was located roughly two miles south of the community, was being improved at a cost of $1,000, that multiple new houses were being built, and that chestnut harvests were plentiful that year.

By the beginning of the 1880s, the population of the town was forty. On January 29, 1884, four workers were injured during an explosion at Pile's lime quarry in Sipesville." In September 1884, Gabriel Christner was appointed as the new U.S. Postmaster of Sipesville.

On April 1, 1885, the Sipesville School reported an average monthly attendance of roughly between twenty-seven and thirty-four students. A week later, Somerset Township's school board announced its search for a contractor to build a new school in the community.

In 1893, John Sipe was appointed as the U.S. Postmaster for Sipesville. In 1898, longtime Sipesville merchant Peter Sipe was appointed as Somerset County's auditor.

=== 1900s ===
In April 1900, the Somerset Town Council adopted an ordinance that gave the Lincoln Mutual Telephone Company the authority to erect a new phone line between Somerset and Sipesville to improve phone connections between those communities and the county's seat of government. Council members also proposed a tax of $1.00 on each of the affected telegraph, telephone and light poles and a tax of $1.50 per mile on "every mile of wire used by such companies in the borough."

== Geography ==
This community is located on Pennsylvania Route 985, 6.3 miles (10.1 km) north of Somerset.

== Gallery ==
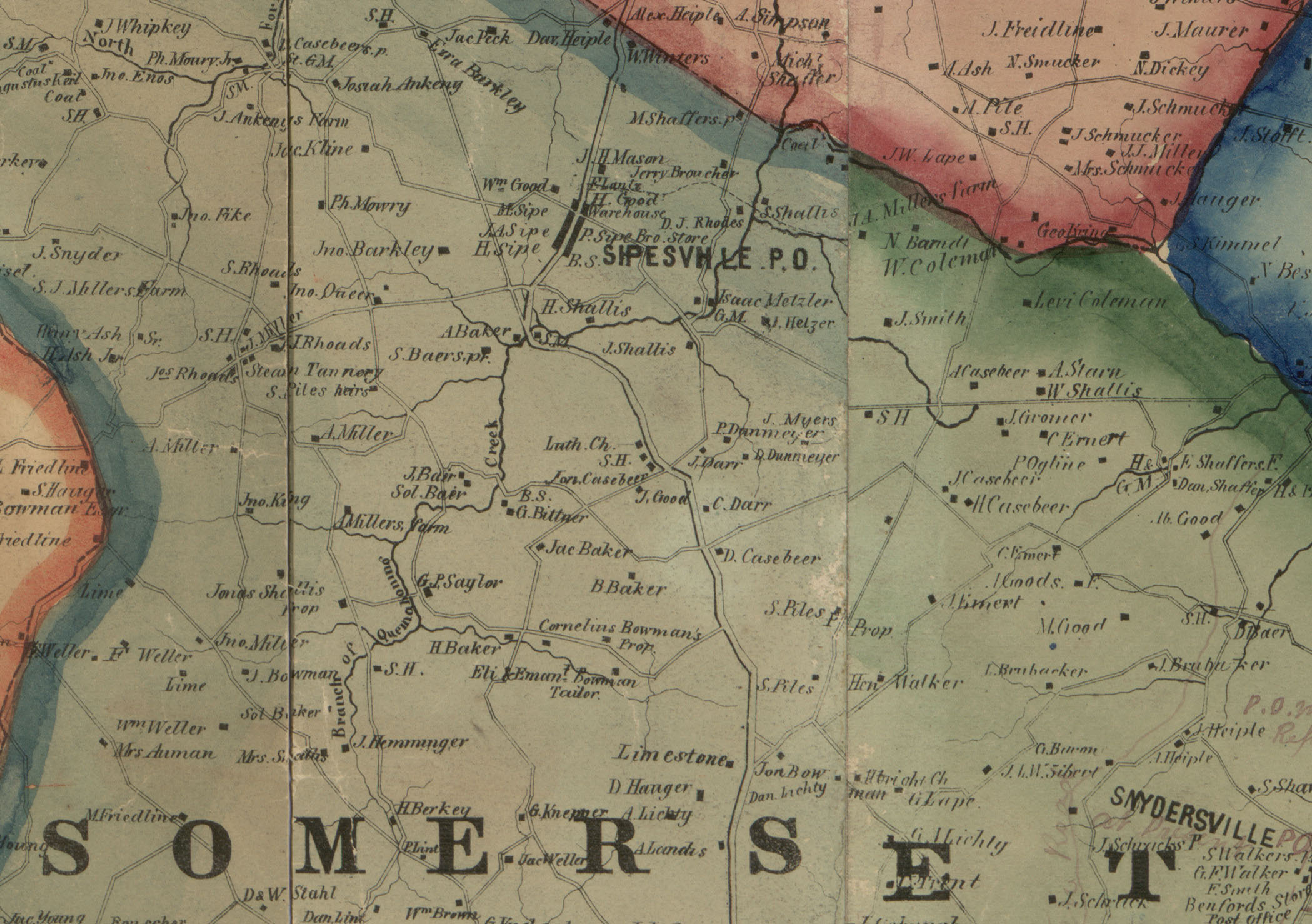
Sipesville, Somerset County, Pennsylvania, 1860
