= Sandy Run, Luzerne County, Pennsylvania =

Unincorporated community in Pennsylvania, US

Sandy Run, Pennsylvania
- Unincorporated community
- Location within Pennsylvania Location within the United States
- Coordinates: 41°01′10″N 75°51′25″W
- Country: United States
- State: Pennsylvania
- County: Luzerne
- Township: Foster
- Elevation: 1,654 ft (504 m)
- Time zone: UTC-5 (Eastern (EST))
  - Summer (DST): UTC-4 (EDT)
- Area codes: 570 & 272
- GNIS feature ID: 1186959

Sandy Run is an unincorporated community in Foster Township, Luzerne County, Pennsylvania, United States.
