= Saginaw, Pennsylvania =

Unincorporated place in Pennsylvania, US

Saginaw is a census designated place and small township in East Manchester Township, York County, Pennsylvania near the Susquehanna River.

== Demographics ==
Historical population
Census	Pop.	Note	%±

The United States Census Bureau defined Saginaw as a census designated place (CDP) in 2023.
