= Salford, Pennsylvania =

Unincorporated community in Pennsylvania, US

- Unincorporated community
- Location within Pennsylvania
- Coordinates: 40°17′45″N 75°27′16″W
- Country: United States
- State: Pennsylvania
- County: Montgomery
- Township: Upper Salford
- Elevation: 197 ft (60 m)
- Time zone: UTC-5 (Eastern (EST))
  - Summer (DST): UTC-4 (EDT)
- ZIP code: 18957
- Area codes: 610 and 484
- GNIS feature ID: 1186863

Salford is an unincorporated community in Upper Salford Township in Montgomery County, Pennsylvania, United States. Salford is located at the intersection of Salford Street, Salford Station Road, and Old Church Road east of the Perkiomen Creek.
