= Franconia Township, Pennsylvania =

Township in Pennsylvania, US

Franconia Township
- Township
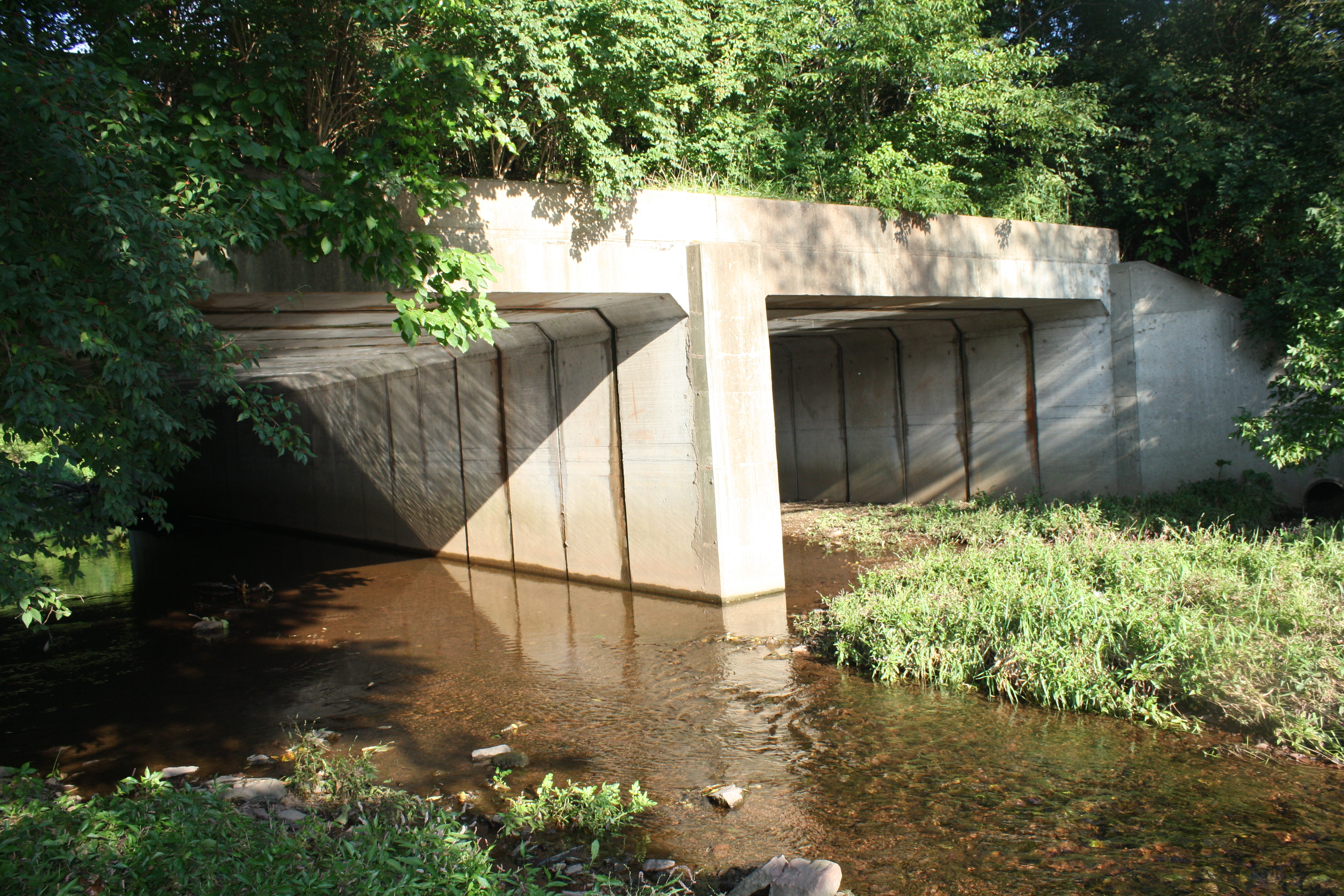
- Skippack Creek at Allentown Road

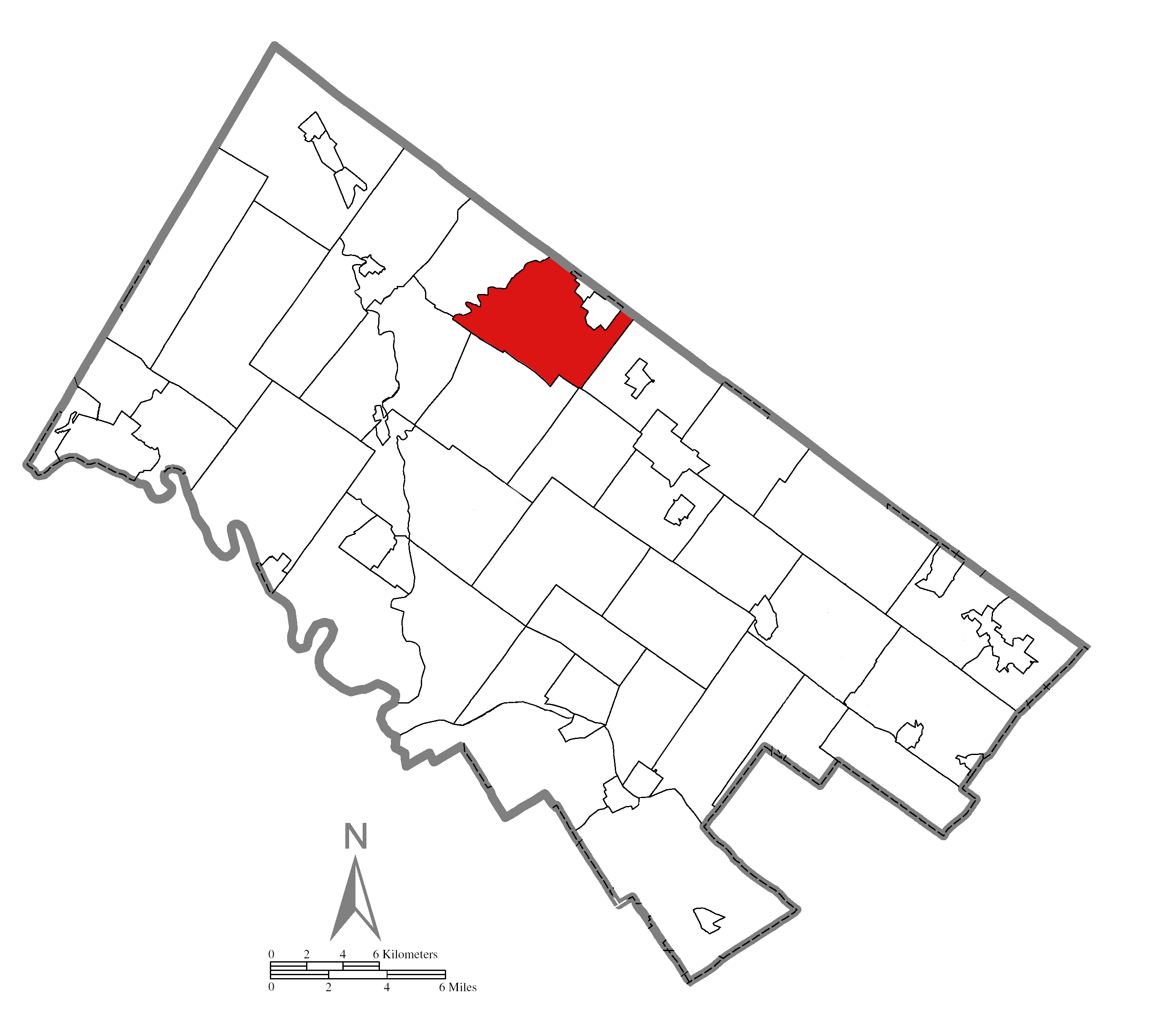
- Location of Pennsylvania in the United States
- Coordinates: 40°18′34″N 75°21′22″W
- Country: United States
- State: Pennsylvania
- County: Montgomery

Area
  - Total: 13.85 sq mi (35.9 km^{2})
  - Land: 13.83 sq mi (35.8 km^{2})
  - Water: 0.02 sq mi (0.052 km^{2})
- Elevation: 407 ft (124 m)

Population (2010)
  - Total: 13,064
  - Estimate (2016): 13,263
  - Density: 944.6/sq mi (364.7/km^{2})
- Time zone: UTC-5 (EST)
  - Summer (DST): UTC-4 (EDT)
- Area codes: 215, 267 and 445
- FIPS code: 42-091-27280
- Website: www.franconiatownship.org

Franconia Township is a township in Montgomery County, Pennsylvania, United States. The population was 13,064 at the 2010 census.

== History ==
Franconia Township was founded in the late 1720s. The name means "Land Of The Franks", and most of the settlers were Germans seeking religious freedom.

=== Klein Meetinghouse ===
The Klein Meetinghouse is a historic Dunkard (Schwarzenau Brethren or Church of the Brethren) meetinghouse built in 1843. The Indian Creek congregation of the Brethren in the United States, which was founded in the area in 1785, built the meetinghouse, and the adjoining cemetery contains the remains of Peter Becker, who led the Brethren to America in 1719.

The Bridge in Franconia Township was listed on the National Register of Historic Places in 1988.

== Geography ==
According to the United States Census Bureau, the township has a total area of 13.9 square miles (36 km^{2}), of which 13.8 square miles (36 km^{2}) is land and 0.07% is water. It is in the Delaware watershed and is drained by the East Branch Perkiomen Creek and the West Branch Neshaminy Creek. The township's villages include Earlington, Franconia, Morwood, Reliance, and Harleysville. Route 113 crosses it from northeast to southwest and its other major road is north-to-south Allentown Road.

=== Neighboring municipalities ===
- Hatfield Township (southeast)
- Towamencin Township (south)
- Lower Salford Township (southwest)
- Upper Salford Township (west)
- Salford Township (northwest)
- West Rockhill Township, Bucks County (north)
- Telford (northeast)
- Souderton (northeast)
- Hilltown Township, Bucks County (east)

== Demographics ==
Historical population
Census	Pop.	Note	%±
1850	1,270		—
1860	1,579		24.3%
1870	1,959		24.1%
1880	2,556		30.5%
1890	2,258		−11.7%
1930	1,915		—
1940	2,040		6.5%
1950	2,774		36.0%
1960	3,910		41.0%
1970	5,245		34.1%
1980	6,545		24.8%
1990	7,224		10.4%
2000	11,523		59.5%
2010	13,064		13.4%
2020	13,259		1.5%

As of the 2010 census, the township was 93.2% White, 1.6% Black or African American, 0.2% Native American, 3.3% Asian, and 1.2% were two or more races. 1.8% of the population were of Hispanic or Latino ancestry.

At the 2000 census there were 11,523 people, 4,151 households, and 3,300 families living in the township. The population density was 833.1 inhabitants per square mile (321.7/km^{2}). There were 4,236 housing units at an average density of 306.2 per square mile (118.2/km^{2}). The racial makeup of the township was 96.57% White, 0.86% African American, 0.08% Native American, 1.71% Asian, 0.01% Pacific Islander, 0.30% from other races, and 0.47% from two or more races. Hispanic or Latino of any race were 0.89%.

There were 4,151 households, 35.1% had children under the age of 18 living with them, 72.2% were married couples living together, 5.3% had a female householder with no husband present, and 20.5% were non-families. 18.0% of households were made up of individuals, and 11.6% were one person aged 65 or older. The average household size was 2.70 and the average family size was 3.07.

The age distribution was 25.2% under the age of 18, 5.0% from 18 to 24, 28.8% from 25 to 44, 21.4% from 45 to 64, and 19.6% 65 or older. The median age was 40 years. For every 100 females there were 90.6 males. For every 100 females age 18 and over, there were 86.0 males.

The median household income was $62,126 and the median family income was $67,209. Males had a median income of $49,952 versus $32,925 for females. The per capita income for the township was $25,751. About 1.4% of families and 3.1% of the population were below the poverty line, including 3.3% of those under age 18 and 6.9% of those age 65 or over.

== Transportation ==
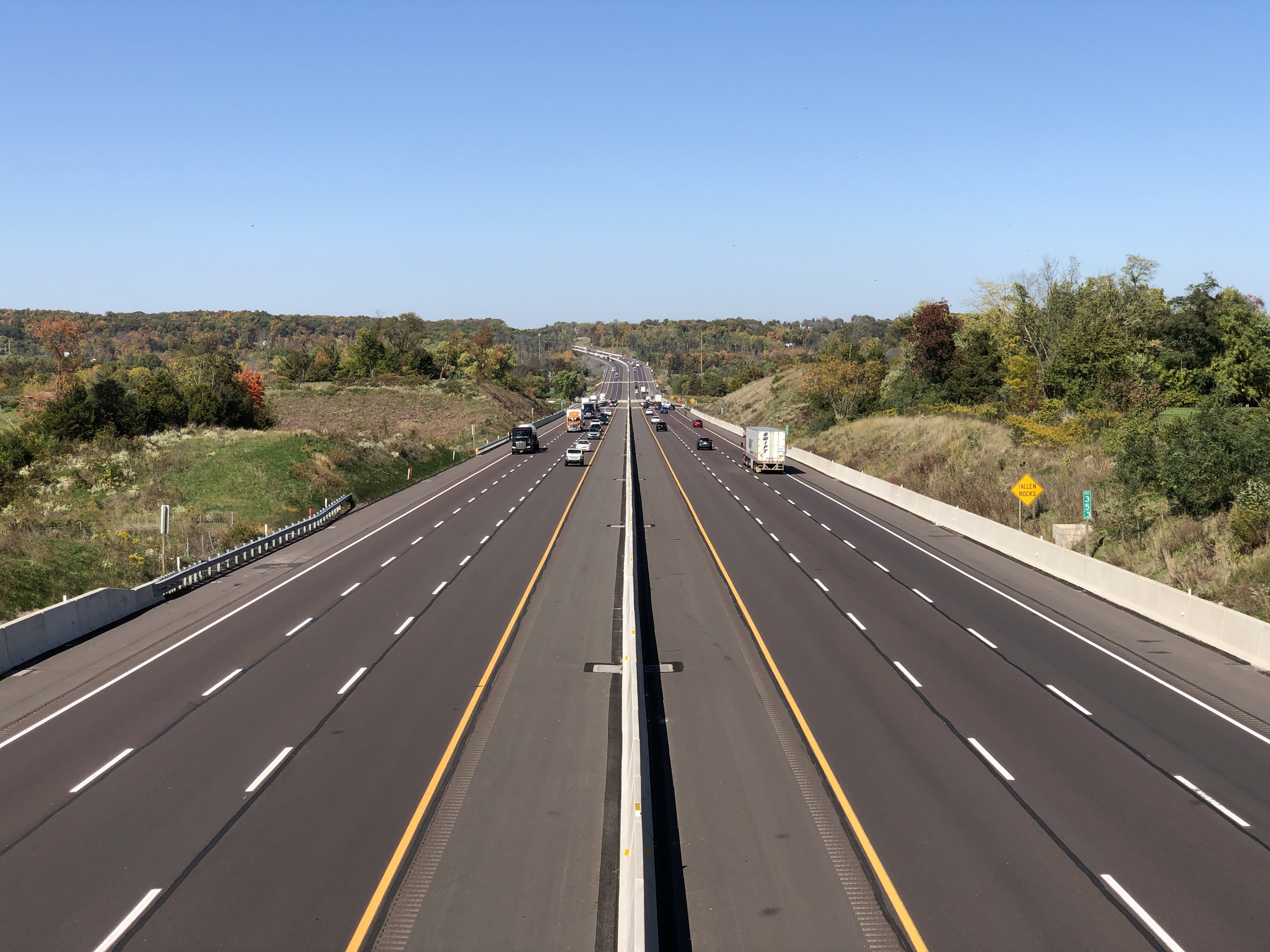
The Pennsylvania Turnpike Northeast Extension (I-476) in Franconia Township

As of 2018 there were 79.47 miles (127.89 km) of public roads in Franconia Township, of which 2.50 miles (4.02 km) were maintained by the Pennsylvania Turnpike Commission (PTC), 19.59 miles (31.53 km) were maintained by the Pennsylvania Department of Transportation (PennDOT) and 57.38 miles (92.34 km) were maintained by the township.

Interstate 476 is the most prominent highway traversing Franconia, following the Pennsylvania Turnpike Northeast Extension along a northwest–southeast alignment across the western and southwestern portion of the township. However, the nearest interchange is south of Franconia in Towamencin Township. Pennsylvania Route 113 is the other numbered highway traversing the township, following a northeast–southwest alignment across northern and western portions of Franconia along Harleysville Pike.

The northeastern edge of Franconia Township near Souderton is served by SEPTA bus Route 132, which runs between the Montgomery Mall and Telford.

== Politics and government ==
Presidential elections results
Year	Republican	Democratic
2020	55.4% 4,781	42.9% 3,700
2016	58.9% 4,259	36.32% 2,630
2012	63.9% 4,489	35.2% 2,478
2008	59.5% 4,119	39.7% 2,746
2004	66.6% 4,054	33.0% 2,009
2000	66.6% 3,209	31.3% 1,511
1996	62.8% 2,321	27.5% 1,016
1992	58.8% 1,915	23.3% 760

Franconia is a Second Class Township governed by five supervisors, elected at-large for staggered six-year terms.

The township is part of Pennsylvania's 53rd Representative District, represented by Rep. Steve Malagari since 2019.
