= Saulsburg, Pennsylvania =

Unincorporated community in Pennsylvania, U.S.

Coordinates: 40°37′14″N 77°53′41″W

Saulsburg is an unincorporated community in Huntingdon County, in the U.S. state of Pennsylvania.

== Etymology ==
Saulsburg derives its name from shortening and alteration of the last name of Henry "Sall" Widersall, a first settler.
