= Upper Salford Township, Pennsylvania =

Township in Pennsylvania, US

- Township
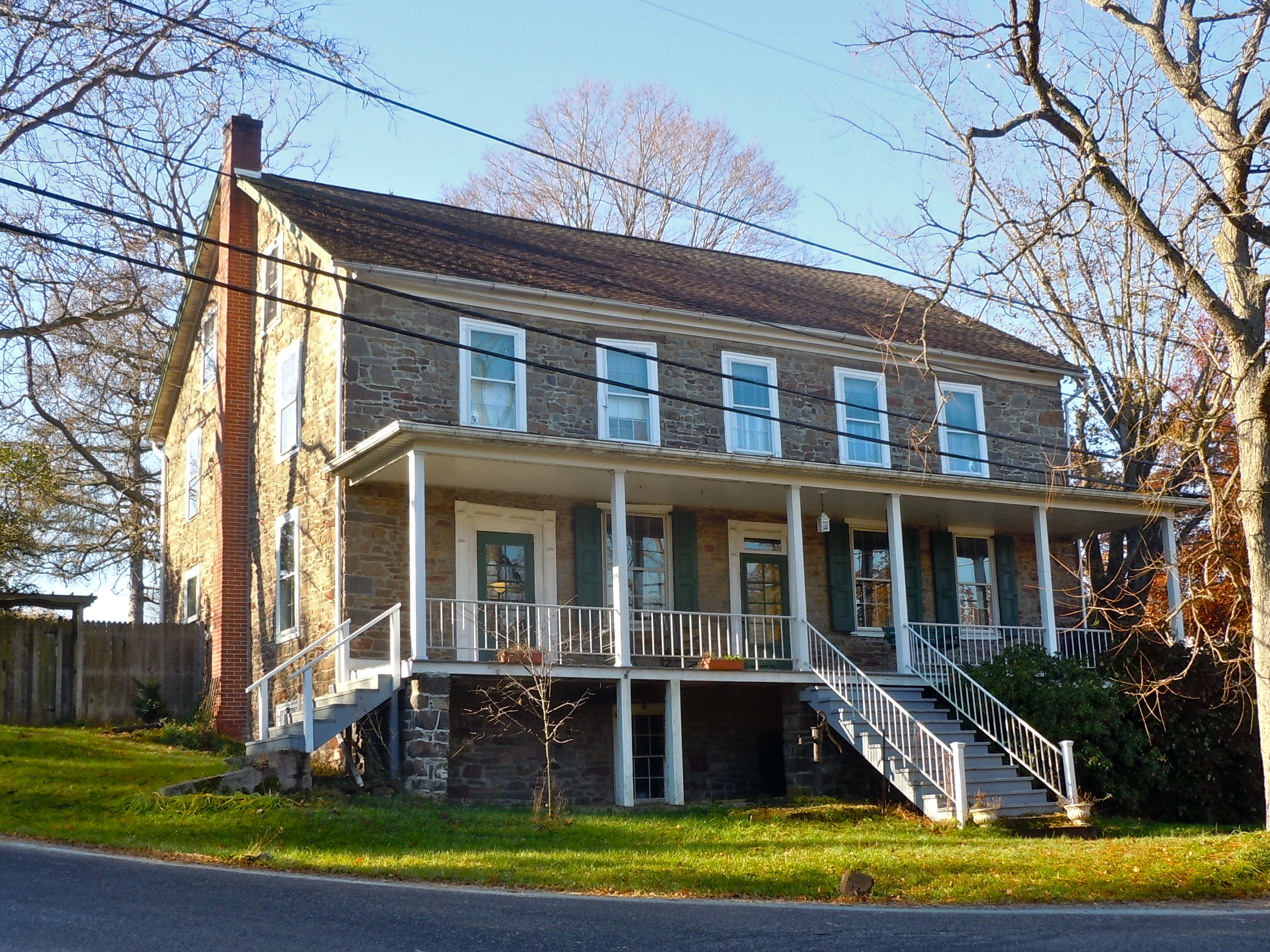
- House by Bergy Bridge

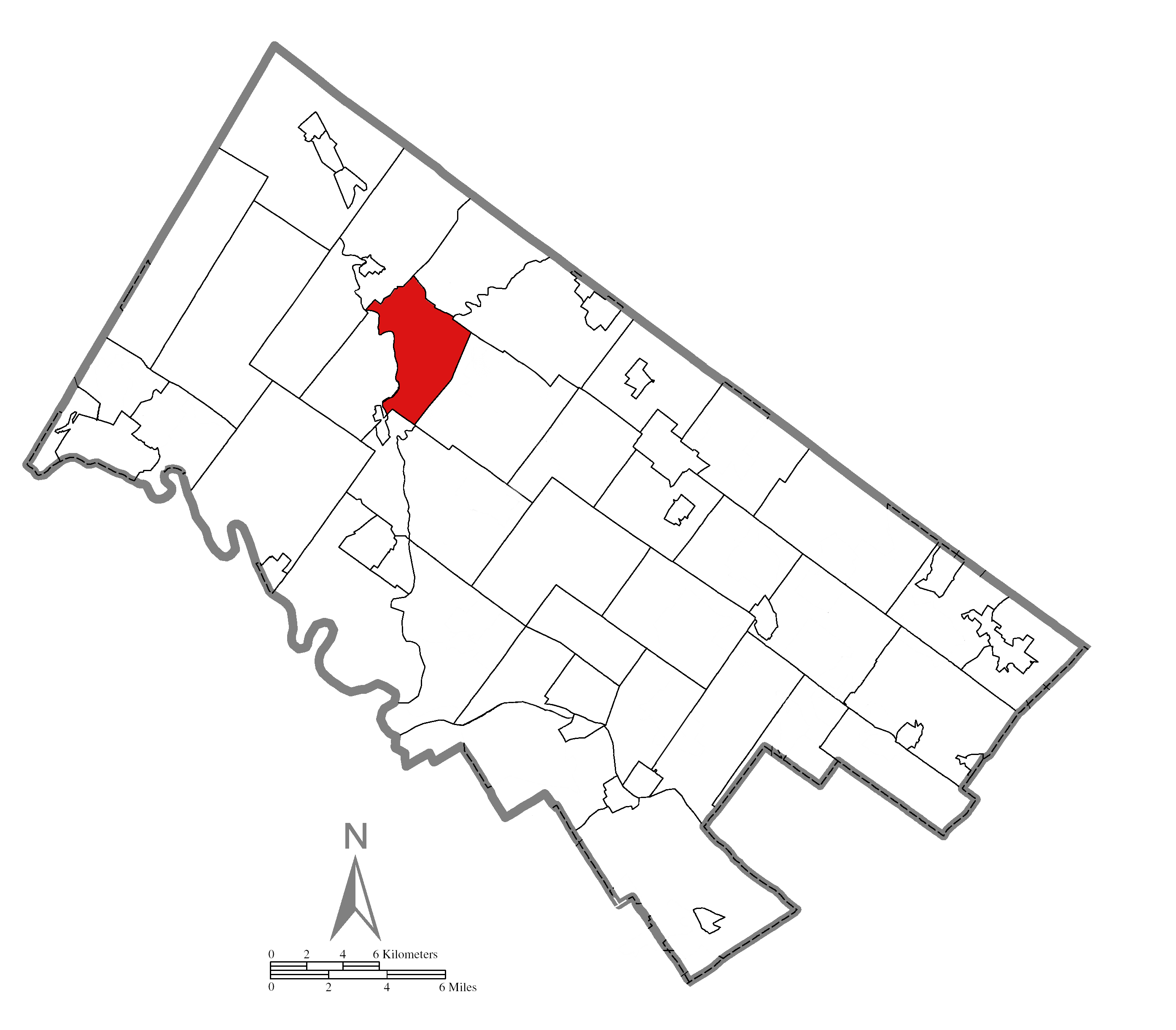
- Location of Upper Salford Township in Montgomery County
- Coordinates: 40°19′27″N 75°26′44″W
- Country: United States
- State: Pennsylvania
- County: Montgomery

Area
  - Total: 9.08 sq mi (23.5 km^{2})
  - Land: 9.03 sq mi (23.4 km^{2})
  - Water: 0.05 sq mi (0.13 km^{2})
- Elevation: 236 ft (72 m)

Population (2010)
  - Total: 3,299
  - Estimate (2016): 3,385
  - Density: 365/sq mi (141/km^{2})
- Time zone: UTC-5 (EST)
  - Summer (DST): UTC-4 (EDT)
- Area codes: 215, 267, 445, 610, 484
- FIPS code: 42-091-79280
- Website: uppersalfordtownship.com

Upper Salford Township is a township in Montgomery County, Pennsylvania, United States. The population was 3,299 at the 2010 census.

== Historical background ==
Upper Salford, founded in 1727, is part of the original Salford Township. In 1741, Salford Township split into Marlborough, Upper Salford, Lower Salford, and part of Franconia Township. In 1892, Upper Salford further split into the present day Salford and Upper Salford townships. The village of Woxall was originally known as Kroppestettel, which in Pennsylvania Dutch means Crow-town. The village was later named Mechanicsville. By the end of the eighteenth century, the town contained a hotel and restaurant, town hall, shoe shop, wheelwright, and 12 homes. The village kept the name Mechanicsville until 1888 when a post office was established. A new name needed to be selected for the post office because another Pennsylvania town had the same name. After much discussion, residents submitted the name Noxall, “Knocks All,” to postal authorities. The name had been read on the side of a bar of a box of soap in the village store. Evidently, they misread the “N” for a “W” and approved the name Woxall for the post office.

The Village of Woxall grew up near the Old Goschenhoppen Church, erected in 1744, where Lutheran and Reformed congregations met. With the arrival of the railroad in 1868, Salfordville, which prospered without railroad or trolley, grew around an old inn. By 1877 it contained a post office, general store, cigar factory, and 19 homes.

The Village of Salfordville was originally situated on a main route between the "upper country" and Philadelphia, from which it was a distant thirty-five miles, and became an early settlement in Montgomery County. This early route was opened in June 1728 and locally passed through Skippack, Lederachsville, and Salfordville on the way to Sumneytown. Along the north-eastern side of Old Skippack Road within the township milestones depicting the distances to Philadelphia may still be seen.

Salfordville was a bustling village in the 1700s and 1800s with a thriving market for livestock and farm goods. Surrounded by farms, the small village had two hotels, a one-room schoolhouse, a cigar factory, a blacksmith livery and a general store. Salfordville was also home to Christopher Dock who was an early German educator, artist, and historian. In fact, the Christopher Dock White Oak tree, estimated to be close to 300 years old, was destroyed by a storm and Upper Salford Township residents replanted a White Oak tree in its place to mark this historic landmark. Finally, genealogy records indicate an early resident, John Michel Weigel, was born here in 1689.

Other villages include Bergey, known in 1893 as Branchville, and Salford, called Rudy in the early 1900s. These two villages, along with Woxall and Salfordville, were noted for their general stores that sold a variety of items including fine clocks, furniture, barrel molasses, and quilting thread. Along the Perkiomen Creek, the village of Salford was once known as Salford Station when the railroad still came through the township.

Farming, particularly dairy farming, was once a primary occupation in Upper Salford. The number of dairy farmers declined as milking techniques modernized and herds became larger. Today, open space is used primarily for crop farming. Spring Mount, once called Stone Hill, was and is a recreation area for the township and the region. At the end of the 1800s, Solomon K. Grimley established an amusement a park, named after himself, on the west end of the mountain. Only a short walk from the railroad, the park included an observatory, picnic and playground facilities, dance floor for hoedowns, and areas for horseshoes and croquet. For a while it proudly displayed the clock from the former County Courthouse in Norristown. For years the Spring Mountain House was a widely known resort. The park was abandoned when it was sold in 1901. Even with the close of the park, the area continued as a popular summer destination for railroad passengers. Today, Spring Mountain is the only downhill ski area in Montgomery County. Prior to becoming a recreation area, however, the mountain was quarried on a commercial basis for its black granite rock. Many Belgian blocks cut from the quarry were hauled by the Perkiomen Railroad to Philadelphia to pave the city's streets. The name Stone Hill died out when the quarry was abandoned around the 1920s.

== Regional setting ==
The 9.0 square mile township sits in the north-western portion of the county and is bordered by Marlborough, Salford, Lower Salford, Perkiomen and Lower Frederick Townships. The township is regionally associated with the Indian Valley (Lower Salford, Salford, and Franconia Townships and Souderton and Telford Boroughs). The area is characterized by rolling open country dotted with timber stands. The land that is "developed" consists of low density residential dwellings (mostly single family detached), recreation areas, farming operations, and crossroads villages.

=== Neighboring municipalities ===
- Marlborough Township (north)
- Salford Township (northeast)
- Franconia Township (east)
- Lower Salford Township (southeast)
- Skippack Township (tangent to the south)
- Perkiomen Township (southwest)
- Schwenksville (southwest)
- Lower Frederick Township (west)
- Upper Frederick Township (west)

== Transportation ==
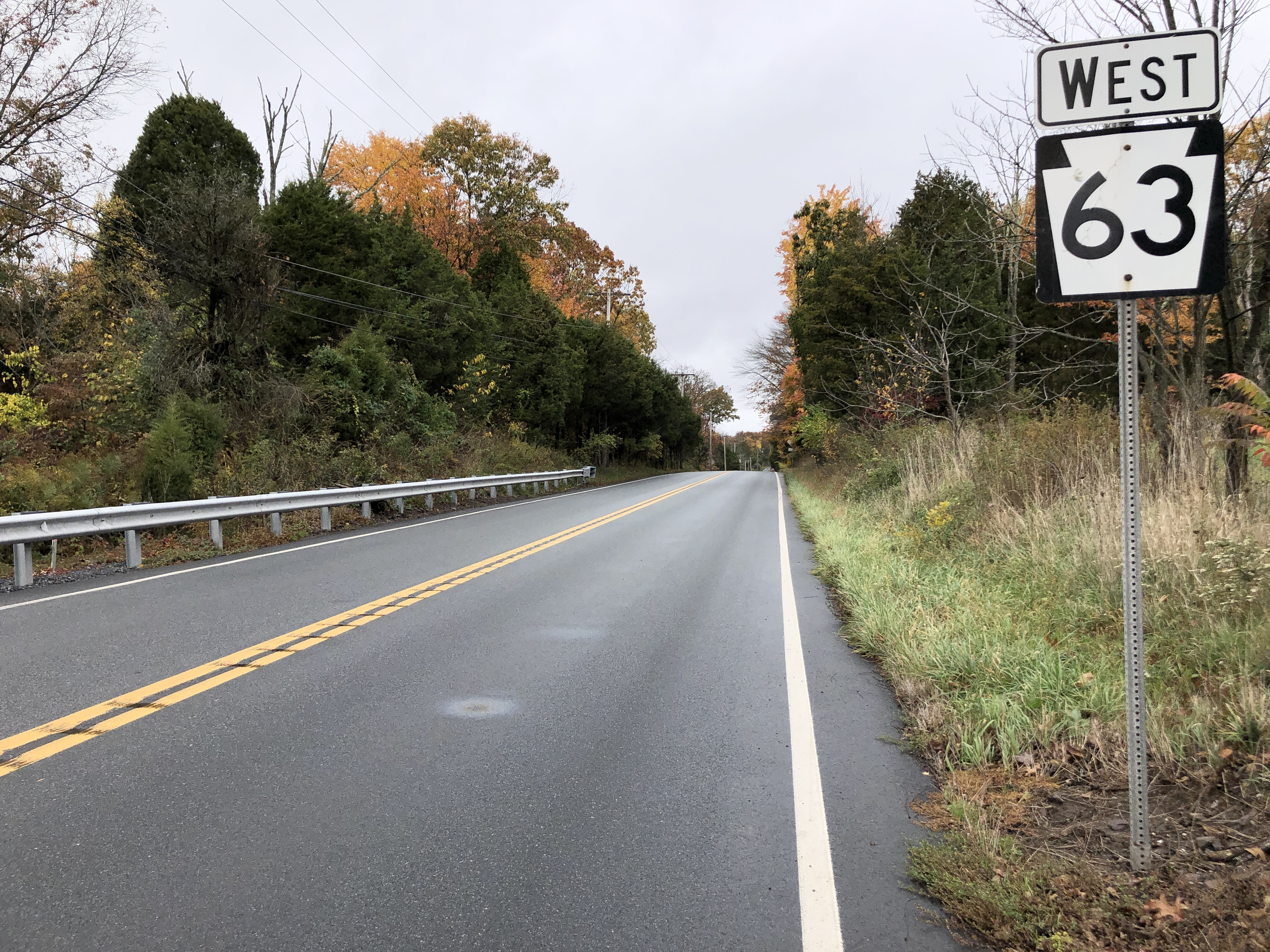
PA 63 westbound in Upper Salford Township

As of 2014, there were 36.50 miles (58.74 km) of public roads in Upper Salford Township, of which 15.13 miles (24.35 km) were maintained by the Pennsylvania Department of Transportation (PennDOT) and 21.37 miles (34.39 km) were maintained by the township.

Pennsylvania Route 63 and Pennsylvania Route 563 are the main highways serving the township. PA 63 traverses the northeastern section of the township on a northwest-to-southeast alignment via Sumneytown Pike. PA 563 begins at PA 63 in the northern portion of the township and heads northeastward.

== Demographics ==
Historical population
| Census | Pop. | Note | %± |
|---|---|---|---|
| 1930 | 800 | | — |
| 1940 | 837 | | 4.6% |
| 1950 | 1,119 | | 33.7% |
| 1960 | 1,273 | | 13.8% |
| 1970 | 1,950 | | 53.2% |
| 1980 | 2,375 | | 21.8% |
| 1990 | 2,719 | | 14.5% |
| 2000 | 3,024 | | 11.2% |
| 2010 | 3,299 | | 9.1% |
| 2020 | 3,172 | | −3.8% |

As of the 2010 census, the township was 94.8% White, 1.4% Black or African American, 1.0% Asian, 0.6% were Some Other Race, and 1.0% were two or more races. 1.8% of the population were of Hispanic or Latino ancestry.

As of the census of 2000, there were 3,024 people, 1,053 households, and 843 families residing in the township. The population density was 335.8 inhabitants per square mile (129.7/km^{2}). There were 1,074 housing units at an average density of 119.2 per square mile (46.0/km^{2}). The racial makeup of the township was 97.06% White, 0.50% African American, 0.26% Native American, 0.86% Asian, 0.03% Pacific Islander, 0.56% from other races, and 0.73% from two or more races. Hispanic or Latino of any race were 0.83% of the population.

There were 1,053 households, out of which 37.2% had children under the age of 18 living with them, 74.3% were married couples living together, 3.5% had a female householder with no husband present, and 19.9% were non-families. 15.1% of all households were made up of individuals, and 5.1% had someone living alone who was 65 years of age or older. The average household size was 2.86 and the average family size was 3.21.

In the township the population was spread out, with 26.8% under the age of 18, 5.8% from 18 to 24, 30.3% from 25 to 44, 27.0% from 45 to 64, and 10.2% who were 65 years of age or older. The median age was 40 years. For every 100 females there were 98.4 males. For every 100 females age 18 and over, there were 99.1 males.

The median income for a household in the township was $68,750, and the median income for a family was $76,975. Males had a median income of $50,957 versus $32,121 for females. The per capita income for the township was $26,672. About 0.4% of families and 1.3% of the population were below the poverty line, including none of those under age 18 and 5.9% of those age 65 or over.

Upper Salford Township is also home to one of the oldest Underwater Recovery Units in America - Telford Vol. Diving & Rescue Unit. Started in 1947 with the Telford Fire Company in response to a drowning victim in a low head dam, it was recognized by those members that there was no emergency service to assist those families that have suffered a loss to a drowning. With numerous water filled quarries of various depth, the Telford Fire Company created a new extension to their Fire Company - A Dive Unit. For many years the Unit was part of the Fire Company up until the 1970s whereupon they separated and became their own 501c3 entity. Having traveled to numerous places - Finger Lakes region, Buffalo, NY, NJ, MD, OH and as far as Winnipeg Canada and all parts of Pennsylvania, the Unit will spend as much time as possible searching for ones loved one. Their equipment consists of multiple types of surfaced supplied diving equipment - ranging from the Mk V (as in the movie Men of Honor), Mk 12 (the replacement for the Mk V), Superlite 27 (the replacement for the Mk 12), Kirby Morgan Band mask, Divator AGA. The unit also has SCUBA capabilities as well as scanning sonar and side scan sonar.

== Government and politics ==
Presidential elections results
| Year | Republican | Democratic |
|---|---|---|
| 2020 | 56% 1,148 | 44% 902 |
| 2016 | 56.8% 1,038 | 38% 695 |
| 2012 | 59.6% 1,061 | 38.6% 688 |
| 2008 | 57.0% 1,006 | 42.1% 743 |
| 2004 | 62.6% 1,062 | 36.7% 622 |
| 2000 | 62.7% 892 | 33.6% 478 |
| 1996 | 56.2% 704 | 31.2% 390 |
| 1992 | 47.2% 578 | 27.2% 333 |

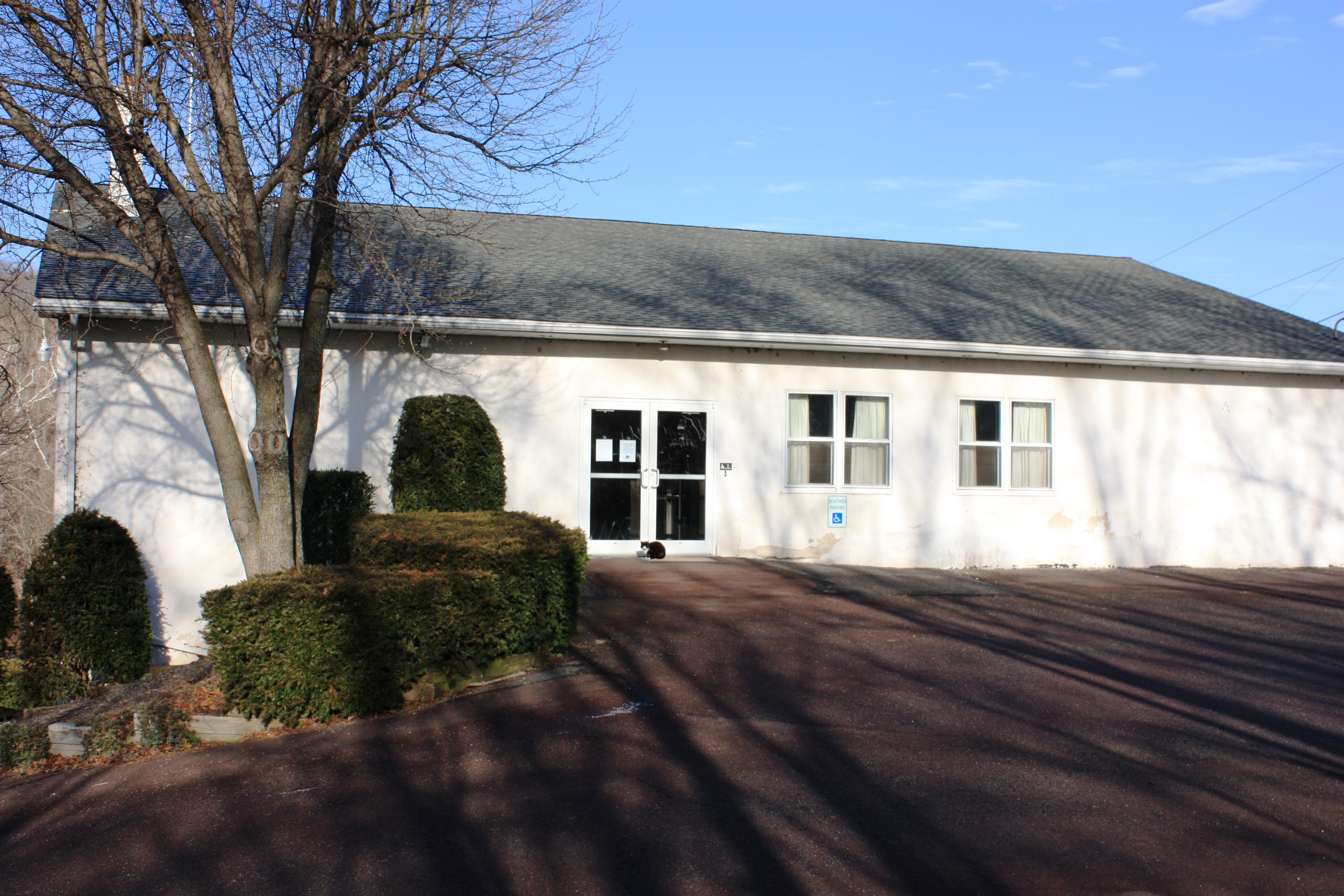
Upper Salford Township Building

=== Supervisors ===
- T.F. Poatsy Jr.
- K.C. O'Donnell
- R.E. Sacks

=== Legislators ===
- US Representative Madeleine Dean, 4th district, Democrat
- State Senator Bob Mensch, 24th district, Republican
- State Representative Tracy Pennycuick, 147th district, Republican
