= Salford Township, Pennsylvania =

Township in Pennsylvania, US

- Township
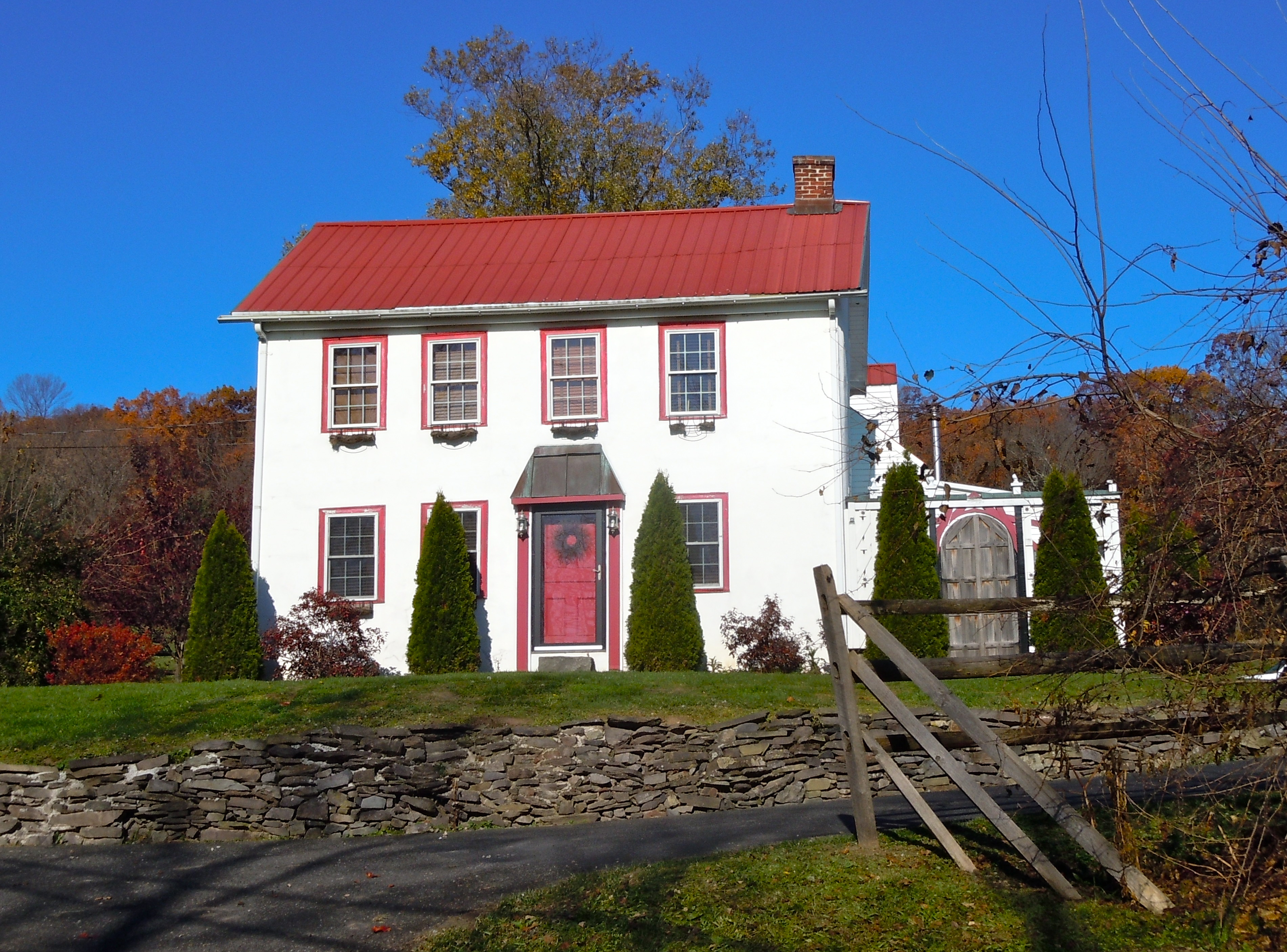
- Landis Homestead on Morwood Road

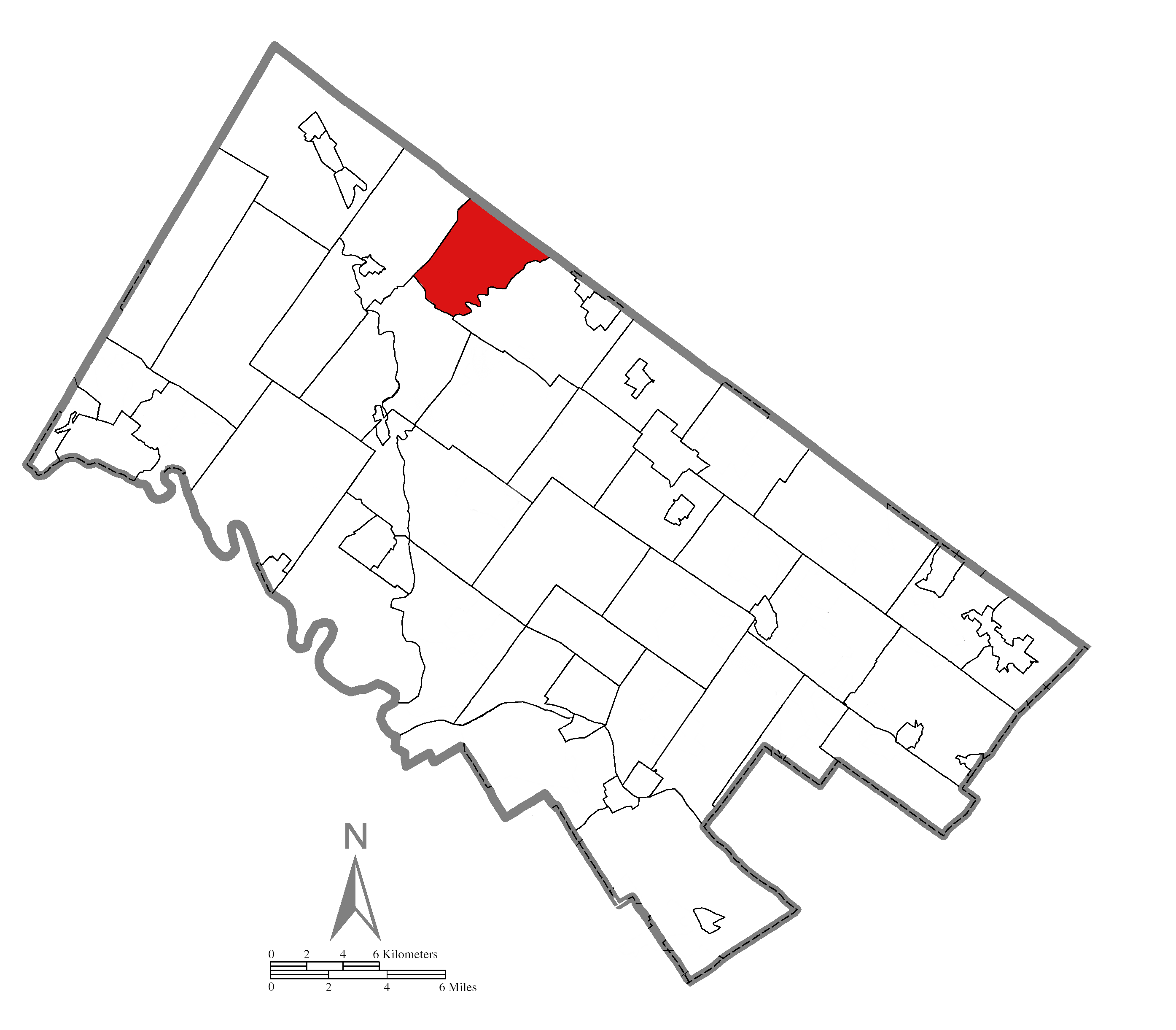
- Location of Salford Township in Montgomery County
- Coordinates: 40°20′03″N 75°22′58″W
- Country: United States
- State: Pennsylvania
- County: Montgomery

Area
  - Total: 9.84 sq mi (25.5 km^{2})
  - Land: 9.81 sq mi (25.4 km^{2})
  - Water: 0.02 sq mi (0.052 km^{2})
- Elevation: 338 ft (103 m)

Population (2010)
  - Total: 2,504
  - Estimate (2016): 2,956
  - Density: 255/sq mi (98.6/km^{2})
- Time zone: UTC-5 (EST)
  - Summer (DST): UTC-4 (EDT)
- Area codes: 215, 267, and 445
- FIPS code: 42-091-67528
- Website: www.salfordtownship.com

Salford Township is a township in Montgomery County, Pennsylvania, United States. The population was 2,504 at the 2010 census.

== History ==
Salford Township, founded in 1892, is a portion of the original Salford Township. In 1741, because of population growth the original Salford Township split into Marlborough, Upper Salford and Lower Salford townships, and part of Franconia Township. In 1892, Upper Salford further split into the present day Salford and Upper Salford townships. The earliest official documents for the original Salford Township are located within the four extant townships and at the state library.

The Landis Homestead was listed on the National Register of Historic Places in 1986.

== Geography ==
According to the United States Census Bureau, the township has a total area of 9.6 square miles (24.7 km^{2}), of which 9.5 square miles (24.7 km^{2}) is land and 0.04 square mile (0.1 km^{2}) (0.21%) is water. The township is drained by the Perkiomen Creek into the Schuylkill River. Its villages include Naceville (also in Bucks County) and Tylersport.

=== Neighboring municipalities ===
- Franconia Township (southeast)
- Upper Salford Township (southwest)
- Marlborough Township (northwest)
- West Rockhill Township, Bucks County (northeast)

== Transportation ==
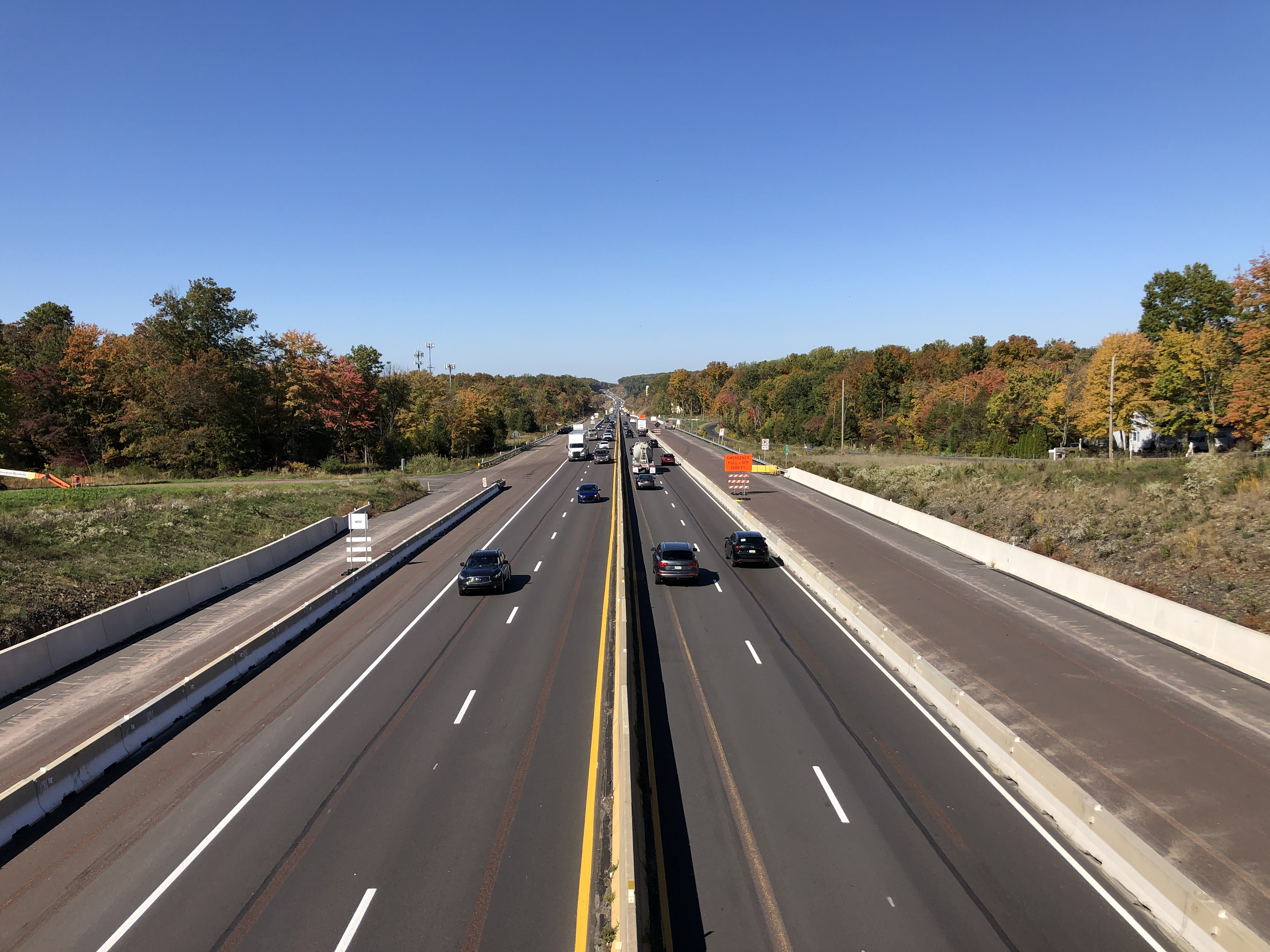
I-476/Pennsylvania Turnpike Northeast Extension northbound in Salford Township

As of 2018 there were 39.39 miles (63.39 km) of public roads in Salford Township, of which 3.00 miles (4.83 km) were maintained by the Pennsylvania Turnpike Commission (PTC), 9.98 miles (16.06 km) were maintained by the Pennsylvania Department of Transportation (PennDOT) and 26.41 miles (42.50 km) were maintained by the township.

The Pennsylvania Turnpike Northeast Extension (I-476) is the most prominent highway passing through Salford Township. However, the nearest interchanges are down in Towamencin Township and up in Milford Township. The main road providing local access is Pennsylvania Route 563, which follows Ridge Road through the township on a northeast–southwest alignment.

== Demographics ==
Historical population
Census	Pop.	Note	%±
1930	650		—
1940	781		20.2%
1950	794		1.7%
1960	1,068		34.5%
1970	1,560		46.1%
1980	1,995		27.9%
1990	2,216		11.1%
2000	2,363		6.6%
2010	2,504		6.0%
2020	3,035		21.2%

As of the 2010 census, the township was 96.8% White, 0.8% Black or African American, 0.2% Native American, 1.0% Asian, and 0.7% were two or more races. 1.3% of the population were of Hispanic or Latino ancestry.

At the 2000 census there were 2,363 people, 807 households, and 677 families living in the township. The population density was 247.8 inhabitants per square mile (95.7/km^{2}). There were 821 housing units at an average density of 86.1 per square mile (33.2/km^{2}). The racial makeup of the township was 97.33% White, 0.68% African American, 0.08% Native American, 0.76% Asian, 0.17% from other races, and 0.97% from two or more races. Hispanic or Latino of any race were 1.10%.

There were 807 households, 36.4% had children under the age of 18 living with them, 74.6% were married couples living together, 5.5% had a female householder with no husband present, and 16.1% were non-families. 12.5% of households were made up of individuals, and 4.2% were one person aged 65 or older. The average household size was 2.92 and the average family size was 3.19.

The age distribution was 25.8% under the age of 18, 7.2% from 18 to 24, 27.1% from 25 to 44, 29.4% from 45 to 64, and 10.5% 65 or older. The median age was 40 years. For every 100 females there were 101.3 males. For every 100 females age 18 and over, there were 103.1 males.

The median household income was $66,775 and the median family income was $73,750. Males had a median income of $46,731 versus $28,250 for females. The per capita income for the township was $29,740. About 0.9% of families and 2.6% of the population were below the poverty line, including 1.2% of those under age 18 and 4.1% of those age 65 or over.

== Government and politics ==
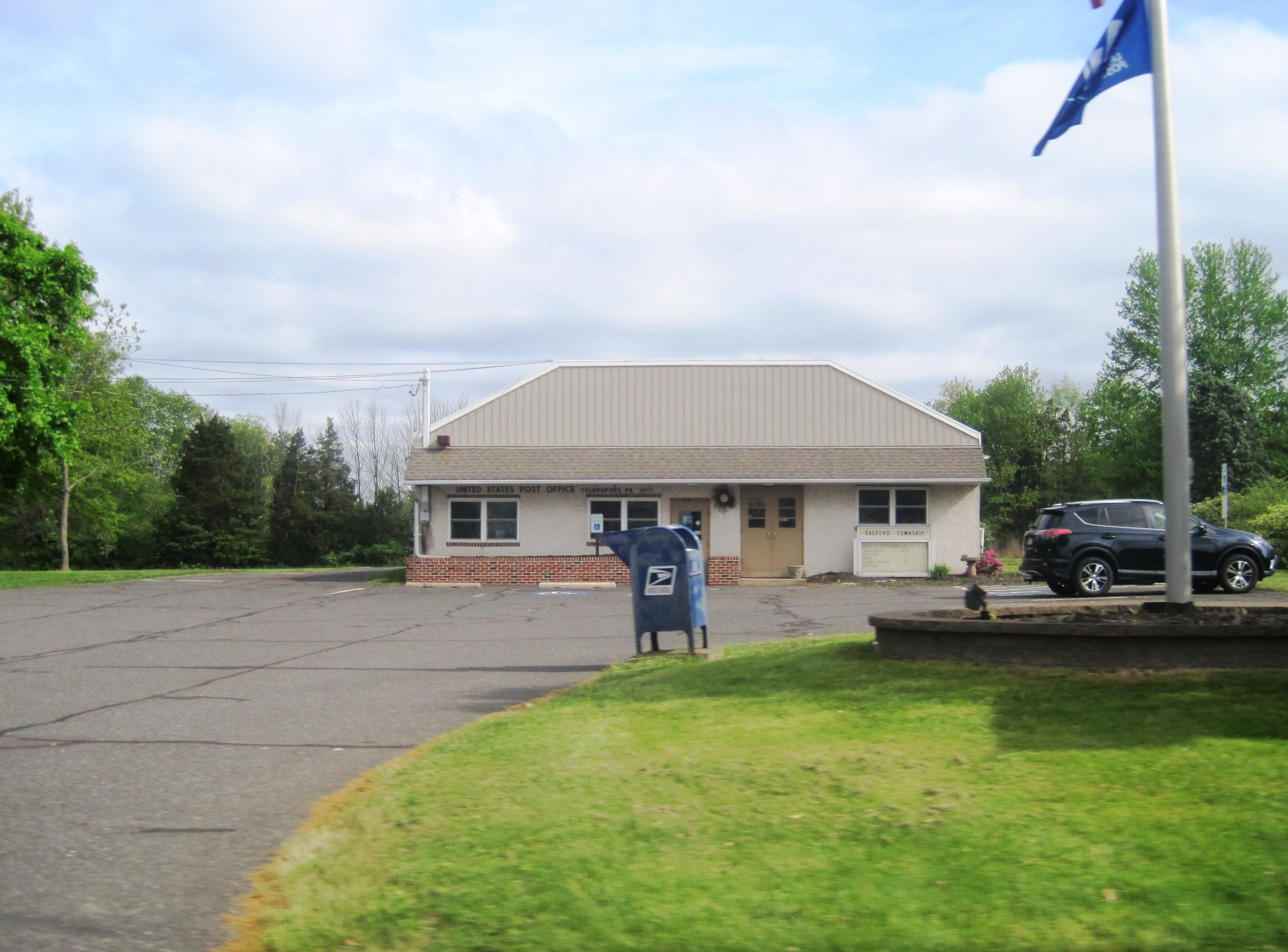
Town hall

Presidential elections results
Year	Republican	Democratic
2020	60.2% 1194	38.5% 763
2016	60.7% 1019	34.7% 582
2012	63.2% 881	34.8% 486
2008	57.2% 791	42.2% 584
2004	61.8% 841	37.9% 516
2000	62.0% 646	34.2% 356
1996	52.5% 469	31.7% 283
1992	45.7% 431	26.8% 253
