= USA Cycling Professional Tour =

Defunct road bicycle racing series

The USA Cycling Professional Tour was a professional road bicycle racing series organized by USA Cycling.

== Results ==
Year	Rider Championship	Team Championship
2007	Levi Leipheimer (USA)	Discovery Channel Pro Cycling Team
2008	Christian Vande Velde (USA)	Garmin–Chipotle
2009	David Zabriskie (USA)	Team Columbia–HTC
2010	Michael Rogers (AUS)	Team HTC–Columbia
