= Cincinnati, Hamilton and Dayton Railway (1926–1930) =

Interurban railway in Ohio, U.S.

Overview
- Locale: Ohio
- Dates of operation: 1926–1930
- Predecessor: Cincinnati and Dayton Traction Company
- Successor: Cincinnati and Lake Erie Railroad

Technical
- Track gauge: 4 ft 8 1/2 in (1,435 mm) standard gauge

The Cincinnati, Hamilton and Dayton Railway (CH&DR) was an electric interurban railway that existed between 1926 and 1930 in the U.S. state of Ohio. It was absorbed in 1930 into the new Cincinnati and Lake Erie interurban railway. In typical interurban fashion, it had its own right of way in open country, although this was often adjacent or parallel to a road. In cities and towns it operated on city streets. This included two and three car freight/express trains as well as passenger cars.

== Creation of the Cincinnati, Hamilton and Dayton ==
In 1926, the former Cincinnati and Dayton Traction Company was reorganized under the new name Cincinnati, Hamilton, and Dayton. The C&DTC right-of-way was part of the former Ohio Electric Railway's line between Dayton and Cincinnati. This new interurban company was headed by the former University of Pennsylvania Wharton School professor of finance, Dr. Thomas Conway Jr., who had already been successful in reviving the interurban Chicago, Aurora, and Elgin Railroad. He ordered all steel interurban coaches, box-motor express cars and freight cars, and spent heavily to improve track and right-of-way. However, the original 1900s rails laid within the brick streets of the cities and towns remained a maintenance problem and were a source of constant arguments with township administrations. Not only were the towns unhappy about who was to pay for street repairs and snow removal, they also complained about the 30 short tons (26.8 long tons; 27.2 t) 50 ft (15.24 m) long and heavy interurban cars mixing in with the growing automobile traffic of the 1920s. Conway did well at building up the CH&D freight business utilizing his new interurban freight equipment, which often was operated at night, and by virtue of his wide contacts in the railroad industry, was more than ordinarily successful in establishing through rates for LCL (less-than-boxcar load freight) with some steam railroads. Conway believed that there was still a place for the interurban in medium distance passenger traffic and longer distance LCL freight, and thus conceived the idea of the CH&D.

== Corporate concerns ==
The following three problems worried CH&D management: the CH&D's neighboring interurban lines might stop running due to financial problems and break their vital freight interchange with the CH&D; increasingly, towns were restricting the operation of freight trains over their streets to nighttime operations only; and interest payments on the very large CH&D bonded debt of $1.3 million borrowed in 1926 could not be met through operating revenue.

== Expansion makes the CH&D become the C&LE ==
In 1930, at the beginning of the Great Depression, Conway purchased and merged his profitable CH&D with two essential connecting interurbans Indiana, Columbus and Eastern, and the Lima-Toledo Railroad, to form the Cincinnati and Lake Erie Railroad. This new line now connected Cincinnati in southern Ohio with Toledo in northern Ohio. Conway then borrowed even more money ($3.7 million in bonds and new corporate stock) and ordered more new equipment, including the innovative light weight aluminium body high speed passenger car "Red Devils" from the Cincinnati Car Company. With two other vitally important for C&LE survival interurban connections at Toledo, the new C&LE provided through interurban passenger and freight service east to Cleveland (Lake Shore Electric) and north to Detroit (Eastern Michigan Railway). The Red Devils operated directly from Cincinnati to Detroit for a while. Freight trains running from Cincinnati through Dayton and Toledo to Cleveland provided the longest continuous and same equipment interurban freight service to ever exist in the United States. Although each year the C&LE shipped more and more freight, the only year that it was profitable was 1936. The accelerating collapse of the American economy through the late 1930s led to further C&LE financial losses and a steady decline in operations. The two essential Toledo connecting interurban lines closed due to bankruptcy, the Detroit connection earlier in 1932, and the Cleveland connection in 1938. This doomed the C&LE, and it was abandoned in 1939.

== See also ==
- List of defunct Ohio railroads
- Cincinnati and Lake Erie Railroad
- Lehigh Valley Transit Company
- Cedar Rapids and Iowa City Railway

== Bibliography ==
- Streetcar, Interurban, and Railroad Information. Retrieved on May 16, 2005.
- The Official Guide to the Railways, January 1930 Edition: Cincinnati, Hamilton & Dayton.
- Middleton, William. The Interurban Era, Kalmbach Publishing, Milwaukee, WI. 1969 (an excellent resource regarding 1910- 1950 interurbans in the United States and elsewhere. Over 400 pages, mostly photographs.)
- Middleton, Wm. The Time of the Trolley, Kalmbach Publishing, Milwaukee. 1964
- Rowsome, Frank Trolley Car Treasury
- Hilton, George The Interurban Electric Railway in America, Stanford University Press, Palo Alto, CA. 2000(a scholarly discussion (405 pages) of the financing, construction, rolling stock, and electrical systems of interurbans as a business. Every U.S. interurban is listed and discussed. No photographs.)
- Keenan, Jack "Cincinnati and Lake Erie Railroad," 226p, Golden West Books, 1974, Corona Del Mar, CA. (ISBN 0-87095-055-X)
