= Lehigh Valley Transit Company =

Company in Allentown, Pennsylvania, US (1905–1972)

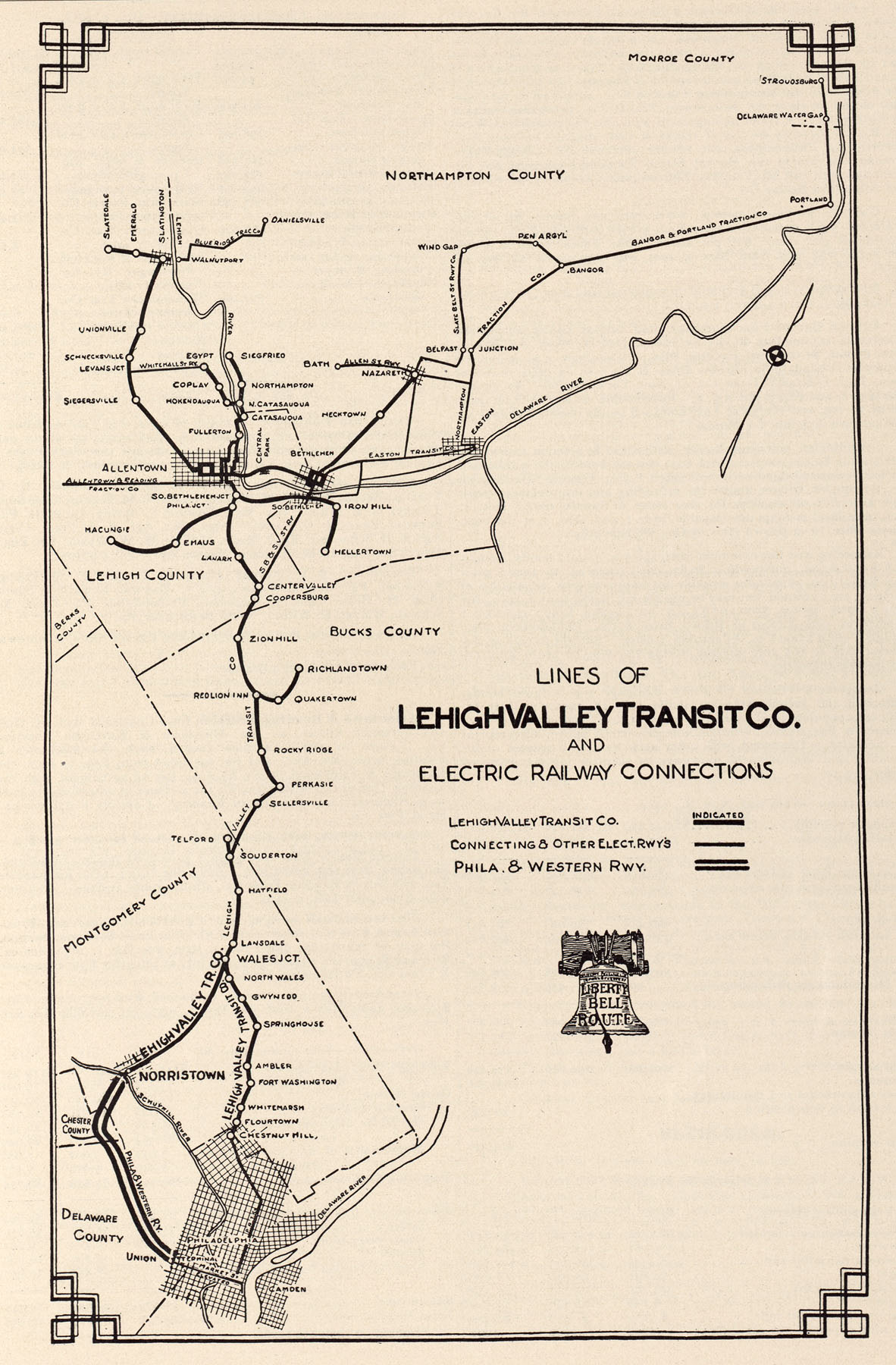
- 1913 map of the Lehigh Valley Transit Company

Overview
- Headquarters: Allentown, Pennsylvania, U.S.
- Locale: Lehigh Valley, Pennsylvania, U.S.
- Dates of operation: 1905–1972
- Predecessor: Allentown and Bethlehem Rapid Transit Company (1891)
- Successor: LANta (1972)

Technical
- Track gauge: 4 ft 8 1/2 in (1,435 mm) standard gauge
- Electrification: 600 V DC trolley wire

The Lehigh Valley Transit Company (LVT) was a regional transport company that was headquartered in Allentown, Pennsylvania. The company began operations in 1901, as an urban trolley and interurban rail transport company. It operated successfully into the 1930s, but struggled financially during the Great Depression, and was saved from abandonment by a dramatic ridership increase during and following World War II.

In 1951, LVT once again financially struggled, and ended its 36-mile (58 km) interurban rail service from Allentown to Philadelphia. In 1952, it ended its Allentown-area local trolley service. It operated local bus service in the Allentown, Bethlehem, and Easton areas in the Lehigh Valley region of eastern Pennsylvania until ultimately going out of business in 1972.

== History ==
=== 19th century ===
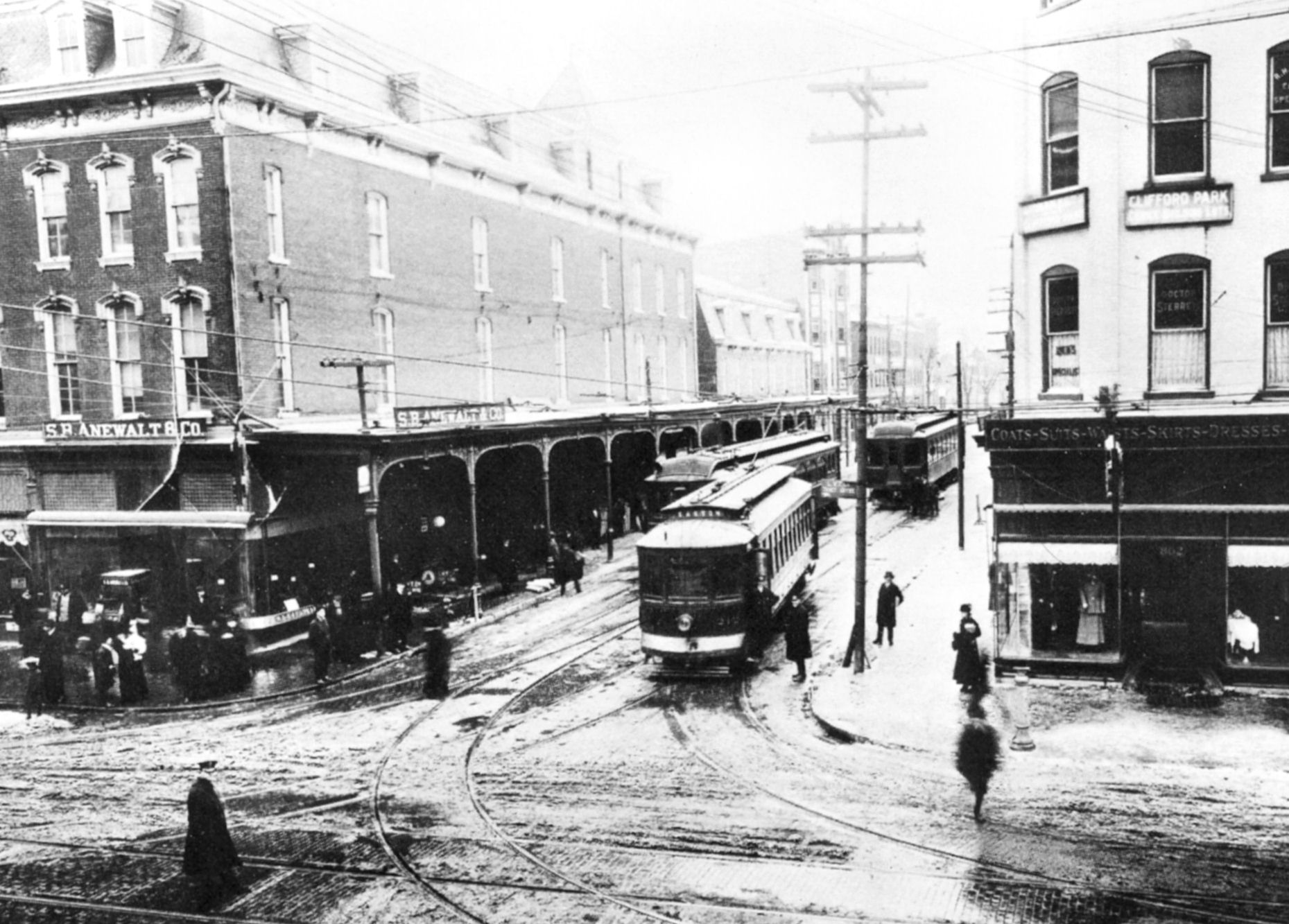
Lehigh Valley Transit Company's transfer point at 8th and Hamilton Streets in Allentown, Pennsylvania in 1914

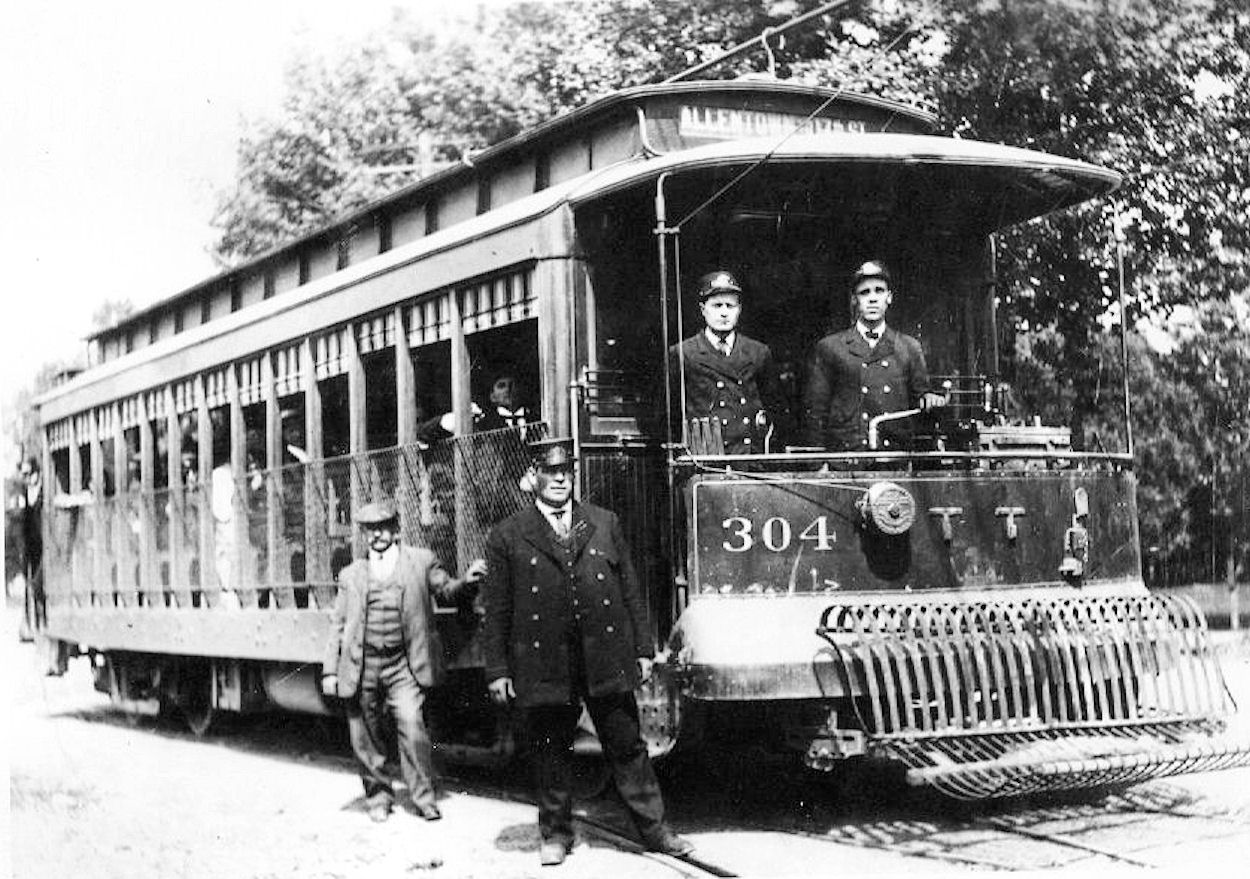
Lehigh Valley Transit Trolley #304 in 1920

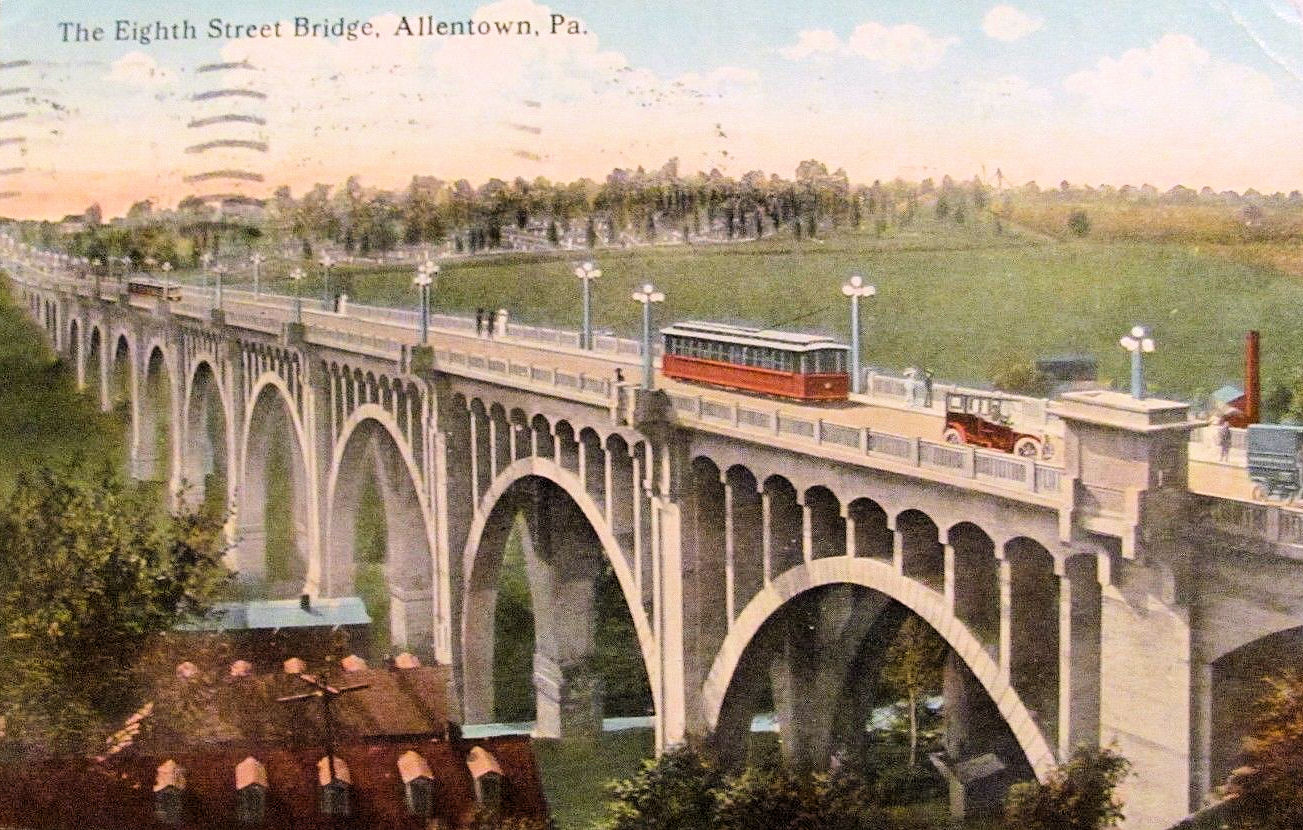
A 1920 postcard of a Lehigh Valley Transit's Liberty Bell Trolley crossing the present-day Albertus L. Meyers Bridge in Allentown in 1920

Public transport in Allentown, Pennsylvania, began on May 21, 1868, when a horse-car line was placed in operation between the Black Bear Hotel at 9th and Hamilton Streets in Center City Allentown and the Lehigh Valley Railroad Depot at 3rd and Hamilton Streets. The transition from horsepower to electric power began in 1891, when the Allentown-Bethlehem Rapid Transit Company erected a powerhouse at Front and Linden Streets in the First Ward near the Lehigh River.

In 1893, the Allentown and Lehigh Valley Traction Company was created by investor Albert Johnson through the combination of a group of local streetcar lines. In 1898, Quakertown Traction Company operated electric trolleys from Richlandtown in Bucks County, Pennsylvania, through Quakertown to Perkasie. By 1900, the Inland Traction Company ran south from Perkasie to Lansdale, and the Montgomery Traction Company ran from there to Norristown. In 1901, a newly-formed Philadelphia and Lehigh Valley Traction Company under Johnson merged these lines and others in the Lehigh and Delaware valleys with the plan of creating a trolley system to reach north to New York City. But Johnson died later that year, and the company fell into receivership in 1903. A 35-mile Allentown to the Chestnut Hill trolley service started the same year. Connection with the Philadelphia Rapid Transit Company street cars at Chestnut Hill allowed riders to continue to downtown Philadelphia.

=== 20th century ===
In 1905, the assets of the new Philadelphia and Lehigh Valley Traction Company were acquired by Lehigh Valley Transit Company. The company's owners started an extensive rebuilding of the Allentown to Philadelphia route. Much side of road track, which was all single track, was replaced by track running in open country. However, considerable older side-of-road trackage remained, particularly south of Quakertown. Heavy wood arch-windowed interurban coaches were purchased for high-speed operation. This upgrading program culminated a high-capacity interurban line running from Allentown to Norristown.

Beginning December 1912, car trains operated from Allentown to Philadelphia's 69th Street Terminal using the Philadelphia and Western Railroad south of Norristown. Service on the former Inland Traction route runs from North Wales to the Chestnut Hill section of Philadelphia continued until 1926, and the route between central Quakertown and Richlandtown ran until 1929, both replaced by bus. The LVT and P&W both reorganized during the next twenty years (LVT twice), but trolleys continued to operate and compete with the nearly paralleling Reading Railroad's Bethlehem to Philadelphia line due to lower cost to riders, particularly during the Great Depression, and then again vitally during the gasoline rationing of World War II.

==== Philadelphia Division ====
Lehigh Valley Transit Company (LVT) formed in 1905. It acquired the existing Lehigh Valley Traction Company, and the new owners started rebuilding of the existing trolley lines and acquisition of interurban cars. In 1912–13, and again in 1925, LVT upgraded track and rerouted lines by building private right of way between some towns, including Quakertown to Souderton, where track was at the side of rural roads and had made frequent 90-degree turns at road intersections causing slow operation. At Wales Junction on the original Chestnut Hill line, a totally new route was constructed northward to Lansdale and southward to Norristown, beyond which trolleys would run on the third rail Philadelphia and Western to the Philadelphia subway terminal at 69th Street Terminal in Upper Darby Township. This allowed LVT passengers to change to the Philadelphia transportation system. This Allentown-to-Norristown route was named the Liberty Bell Line.

LVT's Allentown to Philadelphia division operating to 1951 is considered the last of the eastern U.S. single track, town street to side of road rural countryside hill and dale interurban trolleys in the United States along with the Hagerstown and Frederick and the West Penn Railways of Western Pennsylvania, although the Springfield-to-Media end of the present day 100-year-old Upper Darby Township-to-Media former Red Arrow trolley line, which is now SEPTA's Media–Sharon Hill Line, has some of these same characteristics.

==== Liberty Bell Route ====
The Philadelphia Division Liberty Bell Route, which provided service from Allentown to Philadelphia, was an overhead wire-powered single-track high-speed trolley operation with frequent passing sidings to provide opposing car operation. Each siding defined a block with semaphore signaling at those sidings. Each larger town had a depot with a waiting room and a ticket agent plus facilities to handle trolley freight. South from its downtown Allentown terminal, the LVT's Philadelphia Division served Coopersburg, Zionhill, Brick Tavern, Quakertown, Perkasie, Sellersville, Telford, Souderton, Hatfield, Lansdale, and Norristown.

Much of the LVT route from Allentown to Perkasie was along today's now rural Old Bethlehem Pike, although portions of the route were in open countryside. See the Google interactive LVT route map noted in the Bibliography.

In Norristown, its third-rail-equipped cars continued on the high-speed Philadelphia and Western Railroad to the 69th Street Terminal, Upper Darby terminus, which was the western terminus of the Philadelphia city subway-elevated. Philadelphia and Western Railroad crews operated the LVT cars from Norristown's Markley Street south. Much of the LVT's route was paralleled by the Reading Railroad's steam powered Bethlehem Branch and had many of the same stops. In Lansdale, the two stations faced each other. The Reading Railroad operated passenger service directly to its busy downtown Reading Terminal in Philadelphia, but the LVT was less expensive for frugal riders and made many more village, local, and roadside stops. Some patrons would ride the Reading, for example, from downtown Philadelphia to Lansdale, then walk across the street to the LVT station to catch the interurban home.

As was customary for interurban trolleys, the LVT Philadelphia Division ran fast in open country, but once in a village or town it slowly progressed down streets, made frequent stops, and navigated sharp streetcar-like turns at intersections. In particular, there was extensive center street operation with 90-degree turns at Perkasie-Sellersville, Souderton, and Lansdale.

Long stretches of 80-mile-per-hour operation existed north of Quakertown, and the operator could go to a shunted field motor setting for maximum speed. Open-country private right of way existed, particularly north of Quakertown. Another stretch existed between Souderton and Lansdale and included a steel bridge north of Hatfield known as Gehman Trestle. When LVT started improving the original route, they installed blade-style block signals at track sidings where opposing cars would pass, purchased the faster 800 class heavy, wood, arch-windowed interurban cars from Jewett Car Company, and set up railroad-style dispatching. With these changes, local service using the St. Louis cars and express service using the new Jewetts began between Allentown and Norristown/Philadelphia 69th Street Terminal.

In 1939, LVT purchased thirteen used lightweight high-speed Cincinnati and Lake Erie Railroad Red Devil cars from the abandoned Cincinnati to Toledo, Ohio, interurban to augment its older, heavier, and slower 700 and 800 series interurban cars. The former Red Devils were reconditioned by the innovative LVT Allentown shops and were then operated from Allentown to Philadelphia as Liberty Bell Limiteds. The LVT advertised for and ran freight, but it was a small part of the business. Like most interurbans, its primary income was from passenger service. Box motor freight trolleys usually operated at night, but LVT sometimes ran scheduled passenger trips as a "mixed" train with a freight box motor coupled behind the older 800 or 700 series of passenger coaches. The former C&LE Liberty Bell Limiteds were not built with couplers. During World War II, LVT carried full loads including standees on its overworked equipment. When the war ended, ridership rapidly declined, and LVT again faced bankruptcy and abandonment as it had during the Great Depression.

The extensive Pennsylvania construction of paved highways and the public's increased ownership of automobiles like the Ford Model T in the 1920s caused the financial decline of most interurbans in the U.S. Many were abandoned prior to and definitely during the Great Depression. LVT struggled also during this time but survived, primarily due to the purchase of high-speed lightweight interurbans from the 1938 abandonment of the Cincinnati and Lake Erie interurban in Ohio. Ridership jumped due to gas rationing and increased industrial activity during World War II, but after the war the number of riders dropped again as they returned to their cars. Service quality declined during the 1950s as LVT lost rider revenue, which led to a further loss of riders. Through service on the P&W ended in 1949, and thereafter patrons had to change to P&W trains at Norristown.

=== Philadelphia Division equipment ===
- 1902: a fleet of fifty suburban cars built by St. Louis Car Company was placed into service
- 1912: steel and truss bar supported wood frame 800 series heavy interurban cars purchased from the Jewett Car Company
- 1916: all-steel 700 series cars purchased from Southern Car Company
- 1939: thirteen second-hand purchased from abandoned Cincinnati and Lake Erie Railroad interurban former "Red Devil" squared-rear end cars, built by Cincinnati Car Company, numbered as the 1000 series, plus rounded-rear end car 1030 from the former Indiana Railroad interurban built by American Car and Foundry, purchased to replace a fire destroyed Red Devil 1004
- 1939: second-hand lightweight suburban cars obtained from Steubenville, Ohio, numbered as the 430 serie.

All except the 430 and 1000 series cars could be, and often were, run together in two or three car trains, including combinations of both the 800 and newer 700 series cars. Across the years, equipment modifications were made by the Fairview Allentown shops. The 700 series steel cars were converted from center-entrance two-man crew to one-man cars. Coach 812 was a classic arch window large interurban coach typical of 1912 construction. It was built in the LVT shops as a private car and later converted to regular passenger service. It operated to the last day of rail operation in 1951. The LVT color scheme was an all red body with silver roof until the lightweight 1000 series cars arrived in 1939. Some of the older fleet was then retired and the rest repainted white with red trim and silver roof. Restored LVT car 801 is located in Scranton, Pennsylvania, as part of a growing trolley and interurban collection.

==== Liberty Bell Limiteds ====
The LVT distinguished itself in the transit industry with its 1938-1940 rehabilitation program and the stars of the modernization were the thirteen ex-Cincinnati and Lake Erie high speed former "Red Devils." They were extensively modified by the LVT and were renumbered the 1000 and the 1020 series. This acquisition and rehabilitation probably saved LVT from an earlier abandonment. These well designed interurbans dramatically improved passenger comfort with quick acceleration and high speed capability even with poor track, which improved schedules and service, and they used less electric power than their predecessors. LVT ridership increased, and then with the start of World War II, gasoline and tire rationing required more non-automobile transportation in the Philadelphia region and ridership increased dramatically leading to an exhausting use of LVT equipment. The Red Devils had been the result of one successful Ohio interurban combining with two financially distressed Ohio lines in 1930 to become the 257-mile-long (414 km) Cincinnati and Lake Erie Railroad. C&LE management knew that passenger and freight service had to be improved if the new line was to be profitable. For passenger service, C&LE engineers worked with the Cincinnati Car Company staff in 1929 to design and construct twenty interurban coaches with improved passenger comfort and appeal. Better performance in terms of ride, speed, and reduced power consumption was obtained through improved aerodynamics, reduced car weight, and improved truck design. Significant use of aluminum reduced weight, and the Red Devils provided passengers with comfortable leather bucket seats with headrests. Two drawbacks: they were single ended and had a smaller passenger capacity than provided by the older and longer wood Ohio interurbans, but C&LE planned to increase scheduled service to make up for this. The Red Devils were 43 ft 9 in (13.34 m) long, 11 ft 4 in (3.45 m) high and weighed 24 short tons (21 long tons; 22 metric tons). A typical 1920s large steel interurban was around 56 ft (17.07 m) long, 14 ft (4.27 m) high, and weighed 60 short tons (53.6 long tons; 54.4 metric tons).

A new truck design was a major part of the improved ride. The truck carried four new design compact 100 horsepower (75 kW) motors provided by General Electric. It had smaller diameter wheels (28 in or 711 mm) and a smaller truck frame. Both allowed the car to have a lower center of gravity. Two types of brakes were provided. A magnetic track brake riding between the car's wheels on each truck pressed onto the rail head when the air brakes needed supplemental stopping power. The Red Devils were known for their excellent ride at high speed on rough interurban track. Unfortunately, when the Great Depression deepened, C&LE business declined and it abandoned in 1938 and sold the Red Devils to LVT and to CRANDIC.

==== Golden Calf coach ====
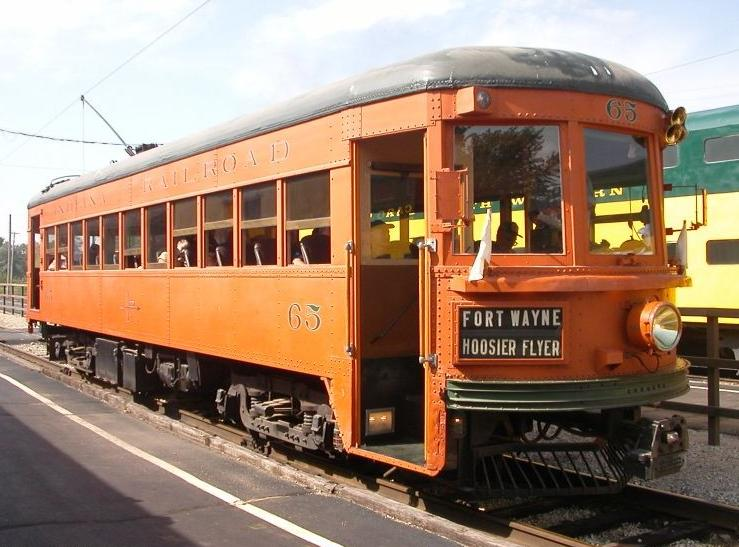
Car number 65, built in 1931, is preserved at the Illinois Railway Museum in Union, Illinois

Similar to the 1930 formation of Ohio's Cincinnati and Lake Erie interurban, a number of struggling Indiana interurban lines were combined to create the new Indiana Railroad. In 1931, the IRR ordered interurbans from the Pullman and American Car and Foundry based upon the Cincinnati Car Company Red Devil design but with improvements. More aluminum was used, and a heavier Commonwealth truck design was adopted to allow more stability at speed. The IRR operated multiple car coupled trains from Indianapolis south to Louisville, so the new IRR lightweights had couplers and a rounded rear end, unlike the Red Devil's squared rear end. The round end allowed coupled car operation around tight curves in town streets. IRR abandoned operations in 1941, and LVT purchased IRR parlor car #55 to replace former Red Devil car 1004 lost in a fire due to 1004's malfunctioning electric car heater at Philadelphia and Western's King Manor station. The fire also burned the station.

Car 55 arrived on the LVT property in IRR's bright traction orange paint scheme and LVT's Fairview shopmen humorously labeled it the "Golden Calf." The shop crew changed the former parlor seating to coach seating and repainted the exterior with LVT's white with red trim (called by the LVT a dramatic "Picador Cream and Mountain Ash Scarlet") and numbered it LVT 1030. It stood out from its former C&LE Red Devil brothers by having more tapered front windows and the round rear end. LVT also replaced the IR Commonwealth trucks with the Cincinnati Car Company's ABC-74D trucks (bogies) salvaged from the 1004. They retained the interior club arrangement, but installed a refrigerator at the first left side window. Transit company officials introduced No.1030 to the public on September 14, 1941, and on October 3, 1941, the luxury car entered the revenue service on the Liberty Bell Route.

Passenger traffic increased steadily during World War II and more passenger capacity was needed, so December 1941 and May 1942, several side-facing individual chairs were removed and replaced by forward and rearward facing sofas in order to increase the seating capacity from thirty to thirty-six. The original IR car design placed the motorman's controls on the left side, but the controller and brake stand were moved to the center by the LVT and a passenger loading door was added at the left front to provide southbound passenger access to the left side Norristown platform. This door was also used at Lansdale and Souderton on northbound trips to allow passengers to unload curbside rather than into the street. Although the frequent stops and occasional steep grades (the climb from Souderton's Broad Street to Summit street was severe) were more demanding on traction motors than Ohio's had been, the former Red Devils and the 1030 performed well until LVT abandonment in 1951. As company earnings severely declined due to post-World War II diminishing ridership, seriously disabled cars were often set aside, not repaired, and cannibalized for parts for other equipment. Car 1030 is now preserved and operating at the Seashore Trolley Museum.

=== Operations ===
==== Allentown ====
A typical daily run for an early morning LVT car operator began at Allentown's Fairview car barn and coach yard (now a park) where he picked up his assigned equipment, usually a lightweight 1000-series car, and took it eight residential blocks on a single track along Lehigh, Cumberland, Lumber, and St. John Streets to 8th Street where he switched onto the main line north, and ran over the 8th Street Bridge and then six blocks to the downtown Allentown station at 6th and Hamilton Sts. where he loaded any people waiting at the terminal. At the scheduled departure time, he began his trip to Norristown. About an hour and one half later, he reached Marshall siding in Norristown where a car exchange would occur with the P&W crew from 69th Street, and the LVT motorman began his return trip to Allentown. A motorman's normal day was two round trips. Obviously if there had been any delays with cars operating in either direction or the need for a defective car replacement (for example, at the Souderton carbarn by standby 1912 wood coach 812) his work day would be extended into overtime. An operator was required to wait until relieved. At the normal midday shift change, a motorman might pick up his car at 6th and Hamilton from the motorman arriving from Norristown, or an exchange could occur at 8th and St. John where the Allentown shop lead tied into the main line to 69th Street, Philadelphia.

==== Norristown ====
Before 1949, when LVT trolleys arrived at Norristown from Allentown, trolley poles were pulled down and secured, car power was switched from trolley to third rail, and the trip continued to 69th Street Terminal just outside Philadelphia (Upper Darby) over the high speed Philadelphia and Western Railroad. After 1949, when decreasing ridership and increasing costs forced a service cut-back to Norristown (only freight trolleys continued running to Upper Darby), LVT motormen had to run their passenger cars in reverse down from the Norristown elevated station, back to Markley and Airy Streets to a loop track known as Rink Siding. This required the motorman to go to the rear of the car and attach controls there. After looping at Rink, the motorman backed the car over the same four city blocks to return to the Norristown station where passengers would board for the next northbound trip. This was an awkward and unpleasant arrangement for the LVT and was indicative of its coming collapse.

==== Souderton ====
Souderton had a ninety degree sharp turn with incline at Main and Broad Streets, and this caused problems for southbound trains. For approximately one block prior to the intersection at Broad, Main Street was on a brief steep grade. During icy conditions, the southbound Main Street incline could be a nightmare for the LVT. While crews from the nearby Souderton car barn worked with ice chippers and sand to provide traction for wheels on rails, the delays were logistically problematic for LVT. The Souderton delays could force cars scheduled an hour apart to stack up waiting for enough sand to be deployed and this also blocked northbound trips. South of the Souderton depot, which was on the northeast corner of Main and Broad, there were sharp turns but track conditions were level. From Main, the southbound track turned west onto Broad Street, ran two blocks, then turned onto residential Penn Avenue where, after four blocks, at Penn and Cherry Lane it entered open country for a fast downgrade run past Gehman trestle to the stop at the Hatfield depot.

== Incidents ==
A devastating fatal wreck occurred in July 1942 in East Norriton Township, north of Norristown. The motorman of northbound lightweight 1003 was waiting at Brush siding near Germantown Pike and had dispatcher's orders to wait for both a southbound passenger car followed by a southbound freight motor, but he proceeded from the siding, violating the horizontal "stop" semaphore signal, and moved onto the main line after only the first passenger car had passed. He may have misinterpreted the "one-long and two-short" horn signal, indicating a following section, for the usual "two-toot" greeting that passing cars often signaled to each other. Alternatively, he may have been preoccupied in conversation with people in the front vestibule. Alongside DeKalb Pike (US 202), the 1003 accelerated and rounded a curve where visibility was limited by track-side vegetation. 1003 rammed head-on into moving freight motor C14. The heavier C14 "telescoped" into the lightweight and twelve people ultimately died, including the motorman of 1003. The motorman of C14 ran into the interior of his freight car, thus surviving, and had the presence of mind to first grab from the cab clipboard his train order authorizing his presence as the second southbound section. The wreck forced dispatching changes and a reduction in operating speeds.

The Associated Press report on the accident: TEN KILLED AND 22 INJURED IN HEAD-ON CRASH OF INTERURBAN AND FREIGHT TRAIN. TRAIN SLICES PASSENGER CAR AT RUSH HOUR. Norristown, Pa., July 9, 1942. (AP) -- Ten persons were killed and 22 injured in the head-on crash of a crowded interurban passenger car and a freight trolley late yesterday on a curve three and one-half miles north of here. The heavy, high-floored freight, running down grade, literally sliced through nearly a third of the passenger car which was en route from Philadelphia to Allentown, Pa., with a rush-hour load. Several of the injured were reported in critical condition at Norristown hospitals. A Philadelphia Red Cross unit, which rushed blood plasma for transfusions, was credited with saving six lives.

The AP story then listed both the deceased and the injured and where the injured were taken for medical treatment. The motorman of the passenger car 1003 was among the dead. The crew of the freight motor survived, and the freight motorman was briefly held by police and county coroner prior to investigation of his actions, and he was cleared of wrongdoing.

A less severe collision occurred the same year just north of Perkasie one evening after the Perkasie stop. Two northbound 1000 series cars were running a few minutes apart as a single dispatched "train." Climbing the grade in the wooded area approaching Old Bethlehem Pike near Three Mile Run road, the first car, 1030, disengaged from the trolley wire, lost its lights, and drifted to a stop. The second car, 1001, rounded a curve and rear ended the stalled and dark 1030. The accident could have been prevented if the motorman had flagged behind his car rather than attempt to recatch the wire in the dark.

== Route and schedule ==
A Saturday-Sunday schedule for April 1938 shows Allentown to Philadelphia interurban "Expresses" leaving Allentown on the hour from 6 am to 10 pm. There were scheduled stops but many more stops occurred simply by a rider "buzzing" the motorman or by flagging the car down. Scheduled arrival at the P&W Norristown station was 1 hr 38 minutes later. Typical running time between the scheduled stops was two to six minutes. The Germantown Pike stop to Norristown's LVT-P&W station stop took a long 14 minutes because it included the southbound-northbound car "meet" with an LVT-P&W operator swap at Marshall passing siding in the middle of Norristown's Markley Street. This siding was located between Elm Street and Marshall Street (closer to Elm). The two cars were positioned door to door so that the motormen could step directly from car to car. Then, a P&W crew took the southbound car a quarter mile down Markley Street to Airy Street where tracks turned east for four blocks, then south on Swede and a jog from Swede onto a trolley-only bridge over Norristown's Main Street and into the P&W's elevated station. The 1938 schedule showed four "Expresses" operating on the line at the same time. Hourly local service had many more stops and used typical streetcar style equipment: vintage 1902 St. Louis-built cars before 1939, and more modern ex-Steubenville Ohio lightweight cars after 1939. Local service operated between the Expresses and ran Allentown to Center Valley at the north end and Hatfield to Norristown at the south end. With four cars operational at any given time, one southbound-northbound limited meet was normally at Marshall siding in Norristown and the other at Nace Siding in open country just north of Souderton and the Souderton carbarn. The Reading Railroad's Bethlehem Branch from Philadelphia served many of the same towns as the LVT, with the passenger trains and trolleys occasionally pacing one another on parallel tracks.

== Stops and sidings ==
Philadelphia Division siding and station scheduled stop list (northbound, with mileage): 0.0 Norristown station.; 0.3 Rink siding (reversing loop); 0.7 Marshall siding, (mid street LVT-P&W crew exchange); 2.0/2.9 Brush siding (near Germantown Pike); 3.5 Washington Square stop; 6.5 Acorn siding(at Morris Road); Wales Jct. stop; 8.7/10.0 long Broad siding (south of Landsdale between Hancock St and Sumneytown Pike); 10.4 Lansdale station; 11.5 Couter siding (adjacent Squirrel at Main streets); 12.6 Angle siding; 13.6 Hatfield station; 14.3/14.8 Gehman stop (south of Gehman trestle); 16.1 Souderton station (Broad and Main); 16.7 Car Barn stop; 17.0 Nace siding; Cope siding (Reliance-Township Line roads junction); 20.0 Sellers siding at Sellersville station; 21.2 Perkasie backup siding at station, 22.8 Ridge siding (along Old Bethlehem Pike); 26.5 Locust siding; 27.2 Red Lion stop; 27.5 Quakertown station (Broad and Main streets); Quakertown siding at Highway 309 underpass; 29.5 Wood siding (crossed Old Bethlehem Pike); 31.4/31.9 Coopers siding; 33.0 Coopersburg stop; 34.3 Center Valley stop, 34.9 School siding, 36.9 Lehigh siding at Lanark, 39.5 Emaus Junction siding (required dispatcher phone); 41.8 Allentown, 8th & Hamilton downtown terminal.

== Trolley freight service ==
In addition to the passenger service, Lehigh Valley Transit also moved freight. It began their freight service in 1908, using converted passenger cars. By 1912, they were purchasing cars manufactured for commercial hauling. In Allentown, the freight house was behind Front Street, near the former A&B meat plant. Throughout the formative years, Lehigh Valley Transit acquired smaller companies and absorbed their freight operations, and its freight operation extended north to Stroudsburg and south to the 72nd Street Freight House in Philadelphia.

== Car barns and shops ==
LVT needed to maintain interurban cars, streetcars, freight trolleys, and line maintenance equipment such as the overhead wire car and the snow sweepers. LVT's primary car storage yard and major shop was the Fairview barn southwest of downtown Allentown. Tracks to Fairview left the main line just south of the 8th Street bridge on St. John Street, ran to Lumber Street, turned south on Lumber to Cumberland, then into the shop yard. To reach downtown from Fairview, LVT had the awkward situation of running interurban cars, sometimes backward, through residential areas along Lumber and St. John streets.

A second maintenance facility and yard was in Souderton, at 2nd and Central Streets. This is now the location of the Souderton fire department building. The Souderton maintenance facility was reached by a track branching from the main line on Summit Street and running two blocks east. The reliable classic all wood arch windowed 801 was kept at Souderton as backup and was used frequently.

== Substations ==
Direct current power for the interurban trolleys on the Liberty Bell Line was produced from high voltage AC power supplied by overhead lines from Allentown by rotary converters at substations in Allentown, Summit Lawn, Coopersburg, Quakertown, Sellersville, Souderton (in the carbarn), Lansdale, and Washington Square. The Summit Lawn brick substation still stands and has a sign stating its history. This is to the east of South Pike Avenue near the Salisbury Township police station.

== Decline and bankruptcy ==
Ridership jumped due to gas rationing and increased industrial employment during World War II, but after the war the number of riders dropped again as they returned to driving their cars. By 1949, many of the Liberty Bell Limiteds were running almost empty. Service quality declined during the 1950s as the LVT lost rider revenue to pay expenses, which led to a further loss of riders. Through service to Philadelphia on the P&W ended in 1949. When the LVT cars stopped running directly to the Philadelphia 69th Street terminal and terminated at Norristown, passengers were required to transfer to Philadelphia and Western cars, travel convenience diminished. The company had become marginal regarding profitability and a bleak future lay ahead. Expenses of maintaining a rail line were high. Along with rolling stock and track, LVT had to maintain AC to DC power conversion rotary converter substations along its line to generate 600 Volt DC trolley power from locally provided AC power.

In 1951, it had an aging car fleet, had to pay all costs to maintain roadbed, track, drainage systems, stations, other buildings, trolley catenary, bridges, and snow removal. And it paid local property taxes. Revenues were not keeping up with expenses and the company faced bankruptcy. Management had been petitioning the Pennsylvania Public Utilities Commission to abandon rail operations, and finally September 1951, they were given permission for a "trial" suspension with a conversion to buses. With no notice to the public, the formerly once an hour white and red interurban trolley cars simply didn't show up the next day.

Operation was converted to buses on back roads, which dissatisfied both employees and riders, versus the direct route served by rail. Management quickly sent crews out to rip up rails, remove signals, and take down trolley wire to prevent being ordered back to rail operation. Cars were sent to the nearby Bethlehem Steel plant for scrapping.

The shutdown of the Liberty Bell Limited caused considerable loss of employment at the shops at Allentown and Souderton. According to the records of the Pennsylvania Department of State, the Lehigh Valley Transit Company survived as a Pennsylvania corporation as a bus company until its dissolution on March 19, 1974.

== Remnants ==
=== Right of way ===
Though the Allentown-Philadelphia interurban line was abandoned in 1951, some former stations still exist, and much of the right of way north of Quakertown can be traced. Parts of the line now are an electric utility right-of-way with an earthen jeep track located where the rails had been. Places where the tracks ran close to the adjacent road (e.g., DeKalb Pike, U.S. Route 202, in Whitpain Township, Montgomery County; Old Bethlehem Pike Perkasie to Quakertown; Lanark Road in Lehigh County), highway widening has often encroached onto the former rail-bed.

Coopersburg: About one quarter mile west of Main Street in Coopersburg are very distinct signs of the former right-of-way. This includes cut and fill terrain on both sides of Trolley Bridge Road, and the abutments of a former long bridge just north of the same road. Within Coopersburg itself, residential Liberty Street named for the Liberty Bell line was placed on top of the former road bed. Portions both south and north are now private driveways.

Quakertown: The Quakertown LVT station, an old inn, at the northwest corner of Main and Broad streets still stands and has a mural on its north wall depicting one of the LVT's 1000 Series Liberty Bell interurbans, the former Cincinnati and Lake Erie acquisitions.

Perkasie: The columned former LVT trolley station with its car siding on Perkasie's Walnut Street now houses the Perkasie Historical Society. It has been beautifully restored. A block north of this is the trolley tunnel under the Reading Railroad's line to Bethlehem. Further north one hundred yards (91 m) are the concrete bridge abutments where the line crossed 9th Street running up grade from the north abutment to Ridge Road. This can be walked at present.

Sellersville: The former LVT Sellersville station at Main and Walnut streets is now (2015) a dental office. In the 1950s following abandonment, it was a police station. The line crossed the Bethlehem Pike-Diamond Street then continued south adjacent to and crossing Perkiomen creek.

Souderton: The LVT Souderton station was on northwest corner of Broad and Main across from the bank and is now gone. The line left town streets southbound from Souderton at Penn and Cherry streets. The former right-of-way is very distinct here and is a jeep trail and pole line. About one mile south are the very distinct two abutments of the former Gehman trestle over Township Line Road north of Cowpath Road.

Hatield and Lansdale: The house-like two story Hatfield former LVT station at Main Street is now the Trolley Station cafe. Inside this cafe there are photographs of LVT equipment and locations plus a 1938 weekend schedule. South of this building the former LVT right-of-way, including an original 1916 culvert, is now the Liberty Bell Trail for walking and biking. A right of way culvert and pole line are at Koffel Street close to the end of Squirrel Lane where the LVT entered Lansdale.

Wales Junction: The original 1900 LVT trolley line to Chestnut Hill and the newer interurban line to Norristown met at Wales Junction at the Sumneytown Pike and Reading railroad.

Map: Some of the former LVT right of way is visible from satellite as a faint scar across the countryside north of Quakertown to Summit Lawn. The DeLorme Company's "Pennsylvania Atlas and Gazetteer Topographic Map" shows "old railroad grades." The abandoned LVT is shown running from Quakertown to Center Valley to the west of present-day Route 309. The LVT periodically ran adjacent to today's Old Bethlehem Pike and PA Route 309.

=== Eighth Street Bridge ===
In 1911, LVT needed a new span across Little Lehigh Creek in order to carry its interurban and trolley cars from center Allentown to the south side. It organized the Allentown Bridge Company and commissioned noted bridge engineer Benjamin H. Davis to design the bridge. The resulting seventeen arch concrete span cost over $500,000 (equal to $16,287,879 today) and required 29,500 cubic yards (22,600 m^{3}) of concrete and 1,100,000 pounds (500,000 kg) of metal reinforcing rods. When opened for traffic on November 17, 1913, it was the longest and highest concrete bridge in the world. It operated as a toll bridge from its November 17, 1913 opening until the 1950s, at which time the toll was five cents for an automobile. The Liberty Bell Limiteds crossed the bridge to begin their run to Philadelphia and also to reach the Fairview car barn to the west of Eighth Street. Concrete poles that once supported the trolley wire are still standing on the bridge to this day. The bridge is now called the Albertus L. Meyers Bridge.

== Museums and societies ==
=== Museums ===
- Electric City Trolley Museum in Scranton, PA adjacent to the NPS National Railroad Museum
- Ohio Railway Museum in Worthington, OH has former Illinois Terminal equipment on display. Also has former Red Devil from the Cedar Rapids and Iowa City.
- Pennsylvania Trolley Museum in East Washington, PA. Operates PCC cars into fair grounds
- Seashore Trolley Museum in Kennebunkport, ME owns and operates Lehigh Valley Transit Liberty Bell Limited interurban #1030, the former Indiana Railroad lightweight interurban #55
- Shade Gap Electric Railway Museum in Orbisonia, PA is adjacent to the operating narrow gauge steam line. Runs two beautifully restored trolleys
- California Railway Museum in Rio Vista, CA operates equipment on a powered mile of former Sacramento Northern track. Runs a beautifully restored Jewett all wood coach.
- Electric Railway Museum in Perris, CA has an extensive collection and operates some equipment

=== Societies ===
- East Penn Traction Club in Cheltenham Township, PA publishes annual streetcar/interurban calendar and hosts a Philadelphia-area traction model show and swap meet in the summertime
- National Railway and Historical Society, Lehigh Valley Chapter in Allentown, PA publishes Lehigh Valley Transit softcover books by author Randolph Kulp
- New England Electric Railway Historical Society in Kennebunkport, ME operates Seashore Trolley Museum
- Rockhill Trolley Museum in Rock Hill, PA operates a trolley museum in central Pennsylvania near Orbisonia

== Bibliography ==
- Borgnis, Mervin; Ride With Me On The LVT, 1996. (Allentown street cars only.)
- Liberty Bell High Speed Line: interactive route map. https://www.google.com/maps/d/viewer?mid=zrgaDi3L2Tns.kOa67LyibYAs&hl=en
- Hilton, George W. & Due, John Fitzgerald (1960). The Electric Interurban Railways in America. Stanford, California: Stanford University Press. OCLC 237973. A very thorough and scholarly book about interurban construction and financing.
- Keenan, Jack (1974). Cincinnati and Lake Erie Railroad. Corona Del Mar, CA: Golden West Books. ISBN 0-87095-055-X.) A very easy to read history of the C&LE with incidents related by former employees. The C&LE sold 13 "Red Devils" to the LVT, and Keenan shows a photo of a former Red Devil loading passengers at Souderton.)
- King, LeRoy; Pennsylvania Trolleys in Color Vol IV: The 1940s, 128p. Morning Sun Books, Scotch Plains, NJ. 2003. (ISBN 1-58248-117-2, Library of Congress 97-070598.)
- Kulp, Randolph; Liberty Bell Route's 1000 Series Interurbans (1958); LVT 700 Series Cars; LVT 800 Series Cars, LVT St. Louis Cars, NRHS, 1960-4. Four softcover publications produced by the Lehigh Valley Chapter, National Railway Historical Society, Allentown, PA.
- Kulp, Randolph; History of the Lehigh Valley Transit Company Railway Operations (1966) National Railway Historical Society, Lehigh Valley Chapter, Allentown, PA.
- McKelvey, William J., Jr. (1989). Lehigh Valley Transit Company Liberty Bell Route- A Photographic History. Berkeley Heights, NJ: Canal Captain's Press. ISBN 0-9613675-1-2. LCCN 88-092760. OL 2071193M. (A lively and entertaining photographic account of the LVT as it progressed northward from Norristown through Lansdale and Quakertown to Allentown.)
- Meyers, Allen, and Spivak, Joel. Philadelphia Trolleys, 128p. Arcadia Publishing, Chicago, 2003-4 (ISBN 0-7385-1226-5)
- Middleton, William D. (1961). The Interurban Era. Milwaukee, WI: Kalmbach Publishing. OCLC 4357897 – via Archive.org.
- Middleton, William D. (#2) Time of the Trolley 436p, Kalmbach Publishing, Milwaukee, WI. 1967 & 1975. (ISBN 0-89024-013-2)
- NRHS: History of the Lehigh Valley Transit Company, Railway Operations (1966), and Liberty Bell Route's Heavy Interurban Cars, History and Roster. (1969). National Railway Historical Society, Lehigh Valley Chapter, Allentown, PA.
- Rohrbeck, Benson; Lehigh Valley Transit Company 1934-1953, 144pp. Rohrbeck Traction Publications, West Chester, PA. (2001). Softcover. Includes many maps.
- Rowsome, Frank, and Steven Maguire: Trolley Car Treasury, 200p, Bonanza Books, NY. (Chapter Empire of the Interurban is a survey of the Interurban era with photos.)
- Ruddell, Ron (2015). Riding the Bell. Bulletin 147. Chicago, IL: Central Electric Railfans' Association. ISBN 9780915348473.
- Springirth, Kenneth C. Suburban Philadelphia Trolleys, 128p. Arcadia Publishing, Chicago, 2007. (ISBN 978-07385-5043-5)
- Volkmer, Wm. Pennsylvania Trolleys in Color Vol I: Anthracite and Pennsylvania Dutch Regions, 128pp. Morning Sun Books, Scotch Plains, NJ. 1997. (ISBN 1-878887-77-7)
- Volkmer, Wm. Pennsylvania Trolleys in Color Vol II: Philadelphia Region, 128pp, Morning Sun Books, Scotch Plains, NJ. 1998. (ISBN 1-878887-99-8)
