= Cincinnati, Hamilton and Dayton Railway =

Cincinnati, Hamilton and Dayton Railway may refer to:

- Cincinnati, Hamilton and Dayton Railway (1895–1917), earlier Cincinnati, Hamilton and Dayton Railroad (1847-1895), a steam railroad that became part of the Baltimore and Ohio Railroad
- Cincinnati, Hamilton and Dayton Railway (1926–1930), an interurban streetcar line
