= Cincinnati Car Company =

1902–1938 subsidiary of the Ohio Traction Company

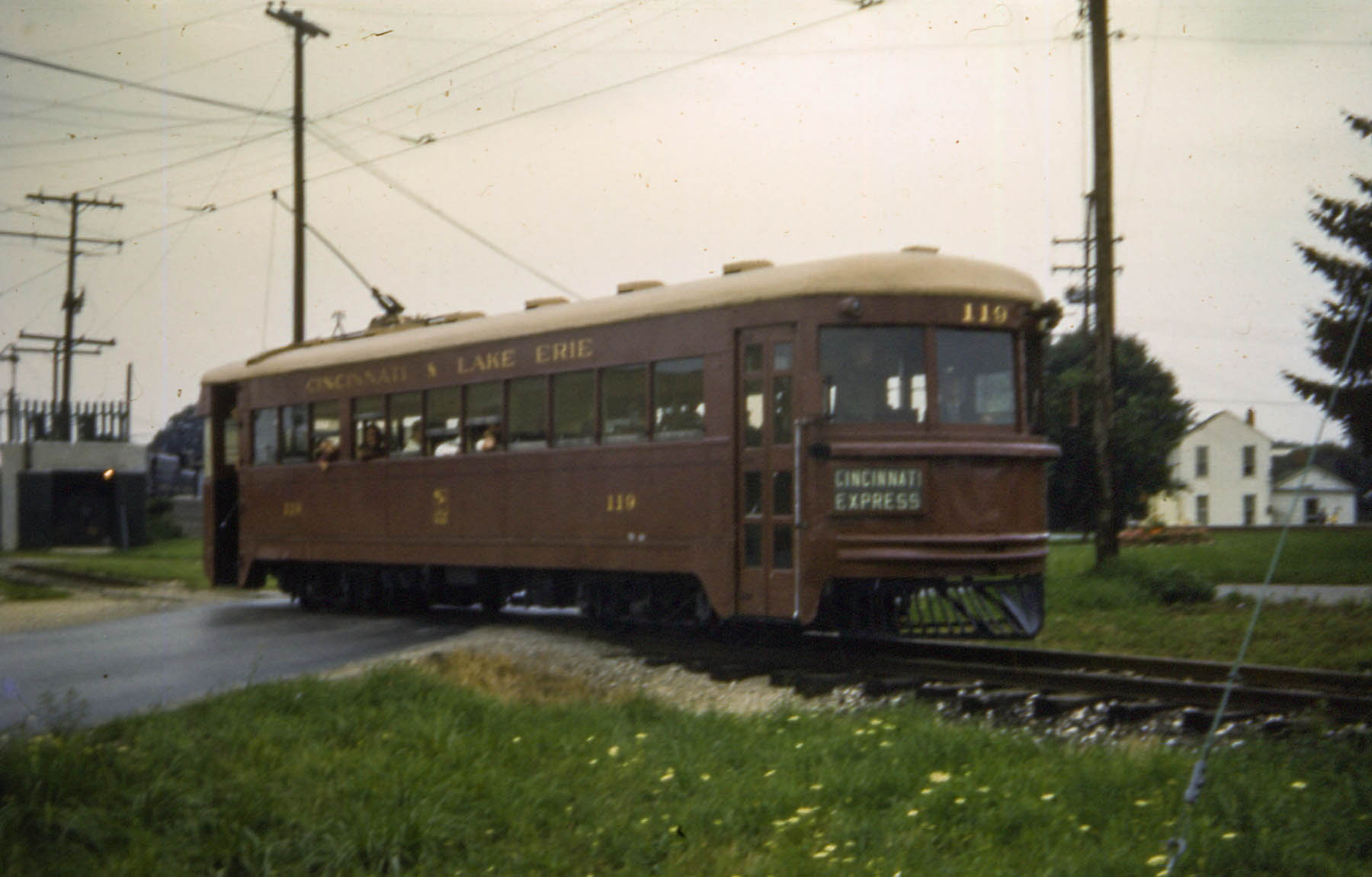
- C&LE #119, one of the famed "Red Devils", at the Ohio Railway Museum in 1966
- Type: Private
- Industry: Streetcar builder
- Founded: Cincinnati, Ohio (1902)
- Defunct: 1938
- Headquarters: Cincinnati, Ohio, USA

The Cincinnati Car Company or Cincinnati Car Corporation was a subsidiary of the Ohio Traction Company. It designed and constructed interurban cars, streetcars (trams) and (in smaller scale) buses. It was founded in 1902 in Cincinnati, Ohio. In 1928, it bought the Versare Car Company.

== Products ==
=== Wood frame cars ===
From 1900 to 1920, Cincinnati Car Co. made many arch window all wood interurban coaches, combines (part passenger, part freight), freight "motors," and work cars. It had many competitors such as JG Brill, Kuhlman, and Jewett.

=== Steel frame cars ===
Starting in the 1920s, interurbans were constructed of steel for easier and faster assembly and improved passenger safety in accidents. This change made the company consume more electric power when operating. When interurban lines began to face stiff competition from autos on state county, newly paved highways, the need to use less power became essential, and Cincinnati Car was among the first manufacturer of interurbans to make lightweight cars. Chief Engineer Thomas Elliot designed the "curved-side" car, a lightweight model that used curved steel plates (not conventional flat steel plates) in body construction. Instead of the floor, the side plates and side sills bore the bulk of the weight. Longitudinal floor supports were no longer needed, which made the cars lighter than conventional cars. The first cars of this type were sold in 1922 and many after. It was a successful product. For instance, the Red Devil weighted only 22 short tons (19.6 long tons; 20.0 t). Curved-sided cars were called "Balanced Lightweight Cars" in advertising.

=== Red Devils for the C&LE ===
In 1929, the company designed lightweight, partially aluminum, low profile, high-speed coaches for the electrified Cincinnati and Lake Erie Railroad (C&LE) interurban that operated between Cincinnati, Dayton, and Toledo and on adjacent interurban lines to Cleveland and Detroit. Twenty were purchased, painted bright red, and called Red Devils by the C&LE. These interurban cars, with open country speed that reached 90 mph (140 km/h), were a forerunner of today's high-speed trains. Both the carbodies and new small wheel low-riding trucks were well adapted for high-speed running on typical interurban light rail rough track. In 1939, the C&LE abandoned operation, and the Red Devils were sold to the Cedar Rapids and Iowa City Railway (CRANDIC) in Iowa and the Lehigh Valley Transit Company in Pennsylvania. They continued to operate successfully into the 1950s.

=== Other interurban buyers ===
Another customer of the Cincinnati Car Company was the Northern Indiana Railway which was centered in South Bend, IN, and had lines radiating to Michigan City, IN, Goshen IN, and St. Joseph, Michigan. Cincinnati Car's lightweight cars were purchased by the Northern Indiana Railway over the years for interurban and streetcar passenger application, as well as trailers and flatcars for freight. Northern Indiana Railway purchased ten new streetcars from the Cincinnati Car Company in 1930, which was their second to last order to fulfill. The Northern Indiana Railway abandoned its last five city streetcar lines in 1930, replacing them with buses. These cars went to the Virginia Electric Company in Richmond where they were used until 1949.

== Preserved cars ==
Cincinnati Car Company ceased operations in 1938, but several of its original streetcars are preserved. Saskatchewan Railway Museum, Cincinnati Museum Center at Union Terminal, Shore Line Trolley Museum, and Seashore Trolley Museum all have streetcars from Cincinnati Car Company.

== See also ==
- List of tram builders
