= AR Inc. =

Pennsylvania microwave company

- Amplifier Research, AR RF/Microwave Instrumentation
- Formation: 1969
- Founder: Don Shepherd and Dan Roth
- Headquarters: Souderton, PA
- Key people: John Kim (COO)
- Website: www.arworld.us

AR Inc. is a Pennsylvania-based provider of microwave instrumentation products. The company was founded in 1969 by Don Shepherd and Dan Roth. It is accredited ISO 17025:2005 by the American Association for Laboratory Accreditation (A2LA).

== Company overview ==
=== Formation ===
Shepherd and Roth started AR Inc. in 1969. In 1973, they moved to the current headquarters in Souderton, Pennsylvania and the company has been operating from here since then. AR Inc. recorded sales of $1 million in 1979 and $25 million in 1996.

=== Expansion ===
The company offers amplifiers, antennas, receiver systems, chambers, EMC field monitoring, and power measuring equipment with applications in the US Army and US Navy. It expanded to operate offices in United Kingdom, France, Benelux and Germany. In 1988, it developed the 100 W solid-state power amplifier covering 100 MHz to 1 GHz, and by 2015 it had achieved a 50,000 W CW, class A, solid state amplifier.

=== Acquisitions ===
In 2017, AR Inc. acquired Sunol Sciences Corporation, now renamed as SunAR RF Motion. SunAR provides precision positioners and reverb stirrers for EMC, OTA, and shielding effectiveness testing; as well as distributed antenna systems for wireless markets. In 2019, AR Inc. became an exclusive distributor of NEXIO products and services.

=== Recognition ===
AR Inc. was the winner of EMC LIVE Product of the Year in 2017 and 2018.
