= 2010 USA Cycling Professional Tour =

The 2010 USA Cycling Professional Tour is the fourth year of this elite men's professional road bicycle racing series organized by USA Cycling.

David Zabriskie (342 points) and Team Columbia-HTC (469 points) are the defending champion of the overall individual and team titles, respectively.

== Events ==
The 2010 USA Cycling Professional Tour consists of the following 8 one-day races and stage races:

Dates	Race Name	Location	UCI Rating	Winner	Team	Series Leader
April 18	Tour of the Battenkill	Cambridge, NY	1.2	Caleb Fairly (USA)	Holowesko Partners U23	Caleb Fairly (USA)
May 16–23	AMGEN Tour of California	California	2.HC	Michael Rogers (AUS)	Team HTC–Columbia	Michael Rogers (AUS)
June 6	TD Bank International Championship	Philadelphia, PA	1.HC	Matthew Goss (AUS)	Team HTC–Columbia	Michael Rogers (AUS)
August 14	USA Cycling Professional Criterium Championships	Glencoe, IL	1.1	David Veilleux (CAN)	Kelly Benefit Strategies	Michael Rogers (AUS)
September 11–12	Univest Grand Prix	Souderton, PA	1.2	Jonas Ahlstrand (SWE)	Team Cykelcity	Michael Rogers (AUS)
September 18	USA Cycling Professional Time Trial Championships	Greenville, SC	CN	Taylor Phinney (USA)	Trek–Livestrong	Michael Rogers (AUS)
September 19	USA Cycling Professional Road Championships	Greenville, SC	CN	Ben King (USA)	Trek–Livestrong	Michael Rogers (AUS)
