= Cincinnati and Lake Erie Railroad =

Interurban railway in Ohio, US

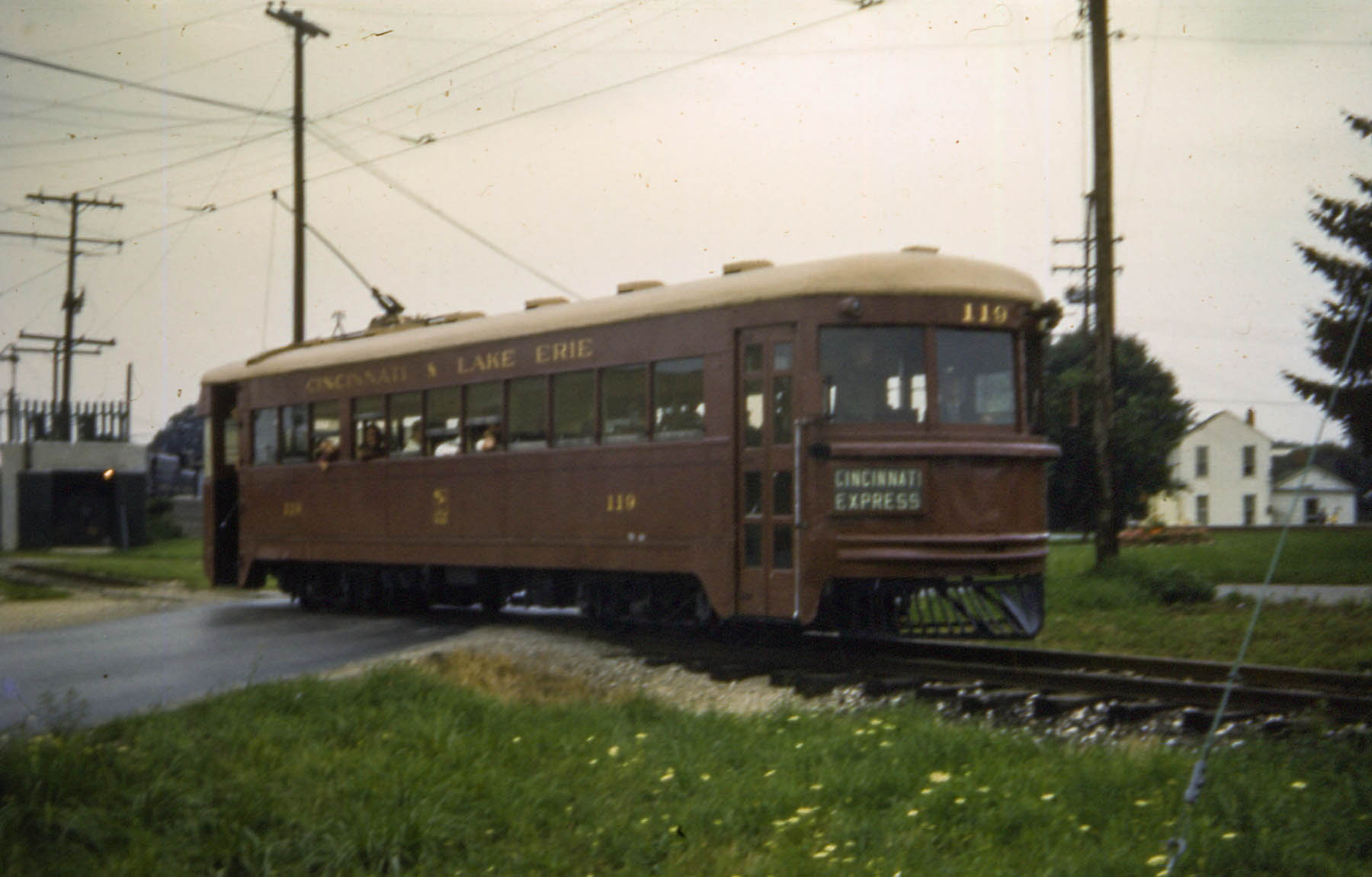
- C&LE #119, one of the famed "Red Devils", at the Ohio Railway Museum in 1966

Overview
- Headquarters: Dayton, Ohio
- Locale: Ohio
- Dates of operation: 1930–1939
- Predecessor: Cincinnati, Hamilton and Dayton Railway

Technical
- Track gauge: 4 ft 8 1/2 in (1,435 mm) standard gauge
- Electrification: 550-600 V DC
- Length: 323 miles (520 km)

The Cincinnati and Lake Erie Railroad (C&LE) was a short-lived electric interurban railway that operated in 1930–1939 Depression-era Ohio and ran between the major cities of Cincinnati, Dayton, Springfield, Columbus, and Toledo. It had a substantial freight business and interchanged with other interurbans to serve Detroit and Cleveland. Its twenty high-speed "Red Devil" interurban passenger cars operated daily between Cincinnati and Cleveland via Toledo, the longest same equipment run by an interurban in the United States. The C&LE failed because of the weak economy and the loss of essential freight interchange partners. It ceased operating in 1939.

== History ==
=== Background: The Consolidation ===
The Cincinnati and Lake Erie Railroad was legally formed as a corporate entity in January, 1930, by the consolidation of three existing 1929 electric interurban lines: the Cincinnati, Hamilton, and Dayton (CH&D); the Indiana, Columbus and Eastern (IC&E); and the Lima-Toledo Railroad (LT). The combination of these three companies created an interurban system that operated a south-north line from Cincinnati through Dayton and Springfield to Toledo, and an east bound line from Springfield to Columbus.

The Cincinnati, Hamilton and Dayton Railway was acquired and reorganized in 1926 by Dr. Thomas Conway, Jr., a professor of business at the University of Pennsylvania's Wharton School. Believing that he could turn the interurban into a very profitable operation, he made substantial investments in infrastructure and rolling stock, including passenger cars and freight locomotives. He spent $500,000 to purchase the CH&D and then spent $1.5 million on improvements. The interurban's business and prospects improved as hoped, particularly in the movement of freight. In 1929, it handled 83,000 short tons (75,000 t) of freight in Cincinnati. Conway then contemplated the advantages of extending his railway north to Toledo, Ohio connecting to Detroit where the C&HD could tap the shipping business of the automotive industry. Thus Conway acquired the Indiana, Columbus and Eastern and the Lima-Toledo as the two teetered at the edge of bankruptcy. These acquisitions gave him the desired access to Toledo. In early January, 1930, the three combined lines were officially incorporated as the Cincinnati and Lake Erie Railroad.

=== Cincinnati and Lake Erie Railroad ===
==== Financing and rebuilding ====
Conway had his new Cincinnati and Lake Erie enterprise issue $3.7 million in stock and $3.5 million in bonds and began an extensive 1930 round of infrastructure improvements and equipment purchases. The timing proved unfortunate as this extensive borrowing was added to the already large bond debt of the earlier CH&D, and it came as the United States entered the Great Depression, which lasted ten years to 1939. The requirement to make the large interest payments on these bonds when added to the railway's normal operating expenses caused the line to operate at a paper loss every year except 1936. When in bankruptcy court mandated "Receivership", the C&LE had the cash to continue to operate due to the suspension of bond payments. The C&LE totaled 323 miles (520 km) in length and consisted of three operating divisions. Company offices and the train dispatching center were located in Dayton, Ohio. The Toledo Division ran from Toledo south to Springfield. The Columbus Division ran west alongside U.S. Route 40 and met the Toledo Division at Springfield, Ohio, and turned south to Dayton. The Cincinnati Division ran south from Dayton through Hamilton to Cincinnati. It followed the old towpath of the Miami and Erie Canal for part of its route. The Toledo Division, formerly the Lima–Toledo, ran parallel to the route of the Baltimore and Ohio Railroad.

==== Connecting interurbans were essential ====
At Toledo, the C&LE interchanged with the Lake Shore Electric Railway (LSE) from Cleveland and the Eastern Michigan Railway from Detroit. At Dayton, it interchanged with the Dayton and Western Traction Company from Indianapolis. All of these neighboring interurban lines provided important freight business for the C&LE, but all were hurting financially. The Eastern Michigan abandoned operations in 1932 and the C&LE lost its connection to Detroit. The Dayton and Western was so weak that the C&LE, in conjunction with the Indianapolis interurban Indiana Railroad, provided the financial support to keep it operating, but it ultimately failed in 1937. The absolutely essential Cleveland connection ended in 1938 when the Lake Shore Electric abandoned after an unwise freight agent strike. The loss of these connections with the related loss of the interchange freight business, particularly that of the LSE, eventually proved fatal to the C&LE.

==== New rolling stock ====
Part of Conway's effort to rejuvenate the C&LE involved improving both passenger and freight business. For passenger service, this meant providing new passenger equipment running on faster schedules. To that end, the C&LE ordered twenty lightweight "Red Devil" cars from the Cincinnati Car Company and participated in the design. They were lighter due to the use of aluminum and sat lower due to the use of smaller wheels and traction motors. These cars featured Art deco styling and had a distinctive bright red paint scheme. Half of the cars were outfitted as parlor cars with first class seating. To demonstrate the new equipment, the C&LE staged a race between car #126 and an airplane. The car "won" after topping out at 97 miles per hour (156 km/h). The Red Devils operated a daily service between Cincinnati–Toledo–Detroit (260 miles (420 km)) and Cincinnati–Toledo–Cleveland (315 miles (507 km)). These were the longest straight through operations using the same equipment on any interurban in the United States. New freight motors were purchased along with freight cars designed to operate on city streets with tight turns at corners.

==== Overnight freight delivery ====
C&LE management turned the numerous and prior legacy regional mid 1920s interurban companies' trolley-freight feeble operations into an efficient, high-speed, freight carrier. With the cooperation of neighboring interurbans in Indiana and northern Ohio, it guaranteed next-morning freight delivery to major cities throughout Ohio, Indiana, and Michigan. The C&LE’s nightly runs between Cincinnati and Cleveland made it the longest and probably the fastest regional interurban freight carrier in America. To improve freight business, the C&LE guaranteed 5pm 8am overnight 178 mile delivery between Cincinnati to Cleveland, a service that conventional steam railroads could not provide. This enabled the C&LE to secure considerable new business, notably that of a Frigidaire plant near Dayton which had the C&LE construct loading tracks directly into their factory. Conway stated that in 1936 that 10 million pounds of freight were interchanged monthly at Toledo. The freight service operating at night had the additional benefit of not interfering with the daytime operation of the new, fast "Red Devil" passenger interurbans. The C&LE also established interchange freight rates with some steam railroads, a rarity for an interurban.

==== Freight train damage to city streets ====
The expanded freight business created tension with local municipalities who did not want freight motors towing multiple freight cars on city streets mixing with automobiles and pedestrians and damaging pavement. There was substantial street damage in both Springfield and Dayton. Springfield sued the C&LE for damages to its brick streets and won, but the railroad was unable to pay or repair the damage it was so broke.

==== Wrecks ====
The C&LE did not employ protective block signaling on its railway due to the cost of installation. It relied on a system of train orders, and train orders have the danger of a motorman not paying attention to where he is scheduled to meet an opposing train. The C&LE experienced several head-on wrecks due to this. One in 1932 near Hamilton, and another in 1934 near Springfield, Ohio. There were fatalities. The costs to settle bodily injury and death claims combined with the serious damage to the Red Devils exceeded the cost of installing block signals had this been done in 1930.

==== Interurban bridge ====
A 1908 constructed reinforced concrete seven arch quarter mile long bridge was built (and still exists though in poor condition) at Waterville near Toledo over the Maumee River which the C&LE used on its route north from Lima to Toledo.

==== Abandonment ====
Competition with a growing population of automobiles riding on state paved highways plus the dire financial impact of the Depression led to a decline in C&LE passenger business. The reasonably good freight business collapsed as the C&LE's interchange partners went out of business. The C&LE ceased operations in 1939. The innovative Red Devils were sold after abandonment: six to the Cedar Rapids and Iowa City Railway (CRANDIC) and thirteen to the Lehigh Valley Transit Company. They operated satisfactorily for both interurbans into the early 1950s.

== See also ==
- Red Devil
- Northern Ohio Railway Museum
- Ohio Electric Railway
