= Versare Company =

Bus and trolley bus maker

- Type: Bus Company
- Industry: Manufacturing
- Founded: 1925; 101 years ago
- Defunct: 1928; 98 years ago
- Headquarters: Watervliet, New York, US
- Products: Bus

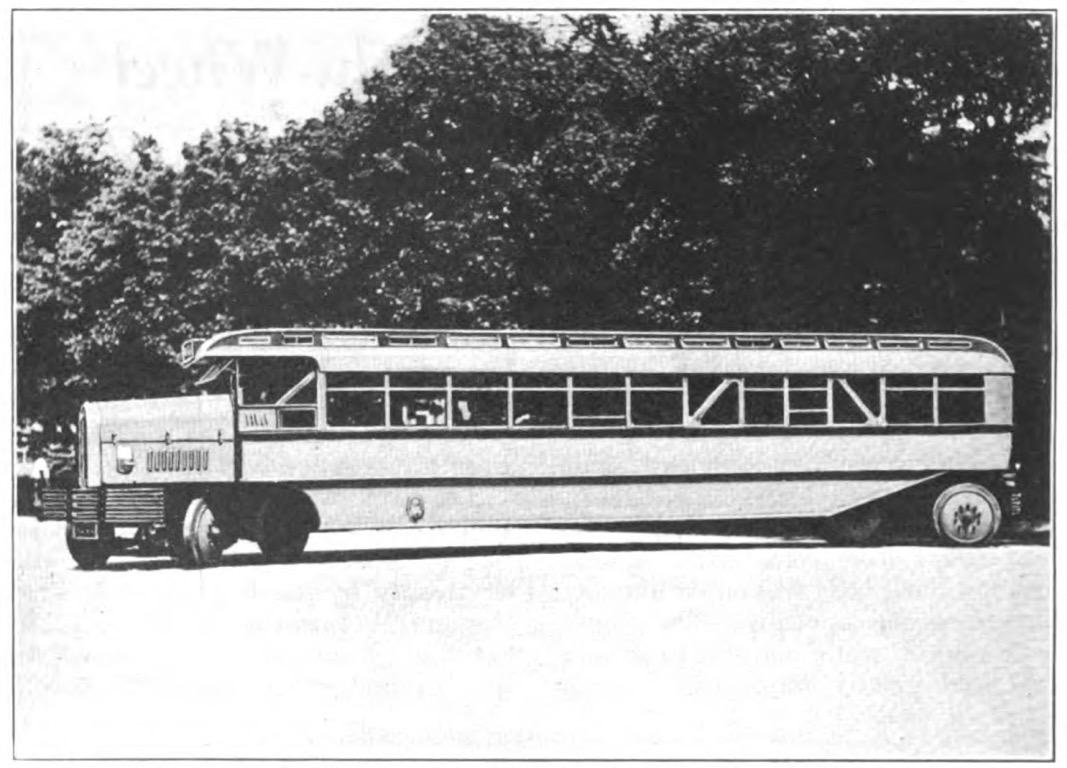
Versare Eight Wheeler (1925)

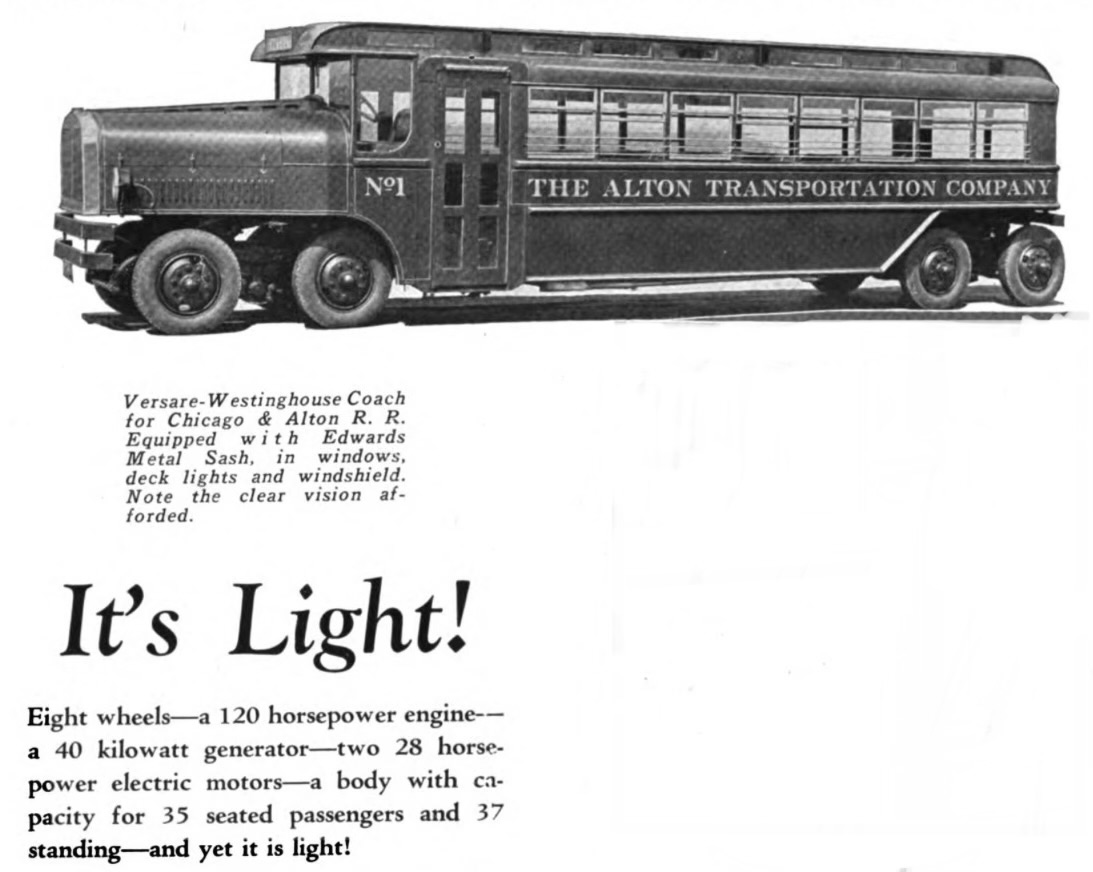
Versare Coach (1926)

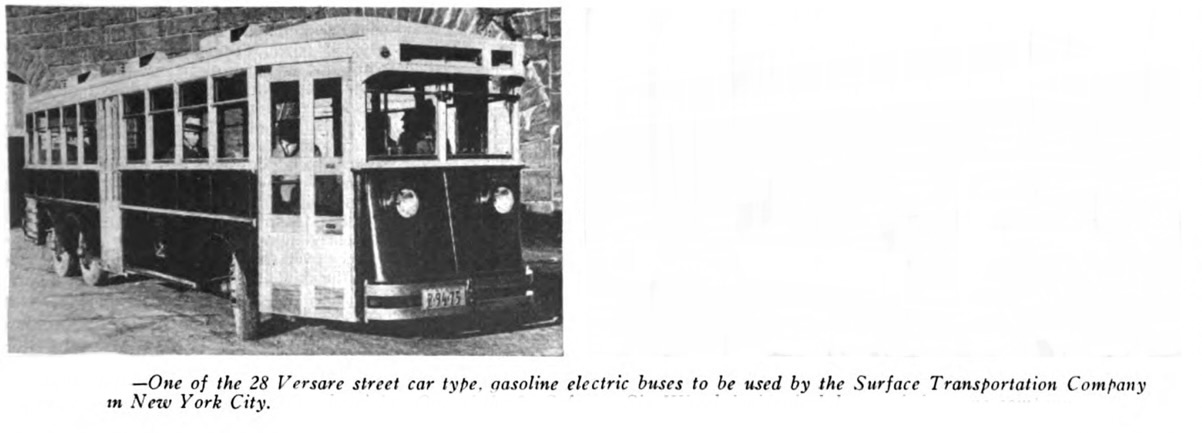
Versare bus (28 are used by the Surface Transportation Company in New York)

Versare Car Company was a bus and trolley bus maker founded in 1925 and originally based in Watervliet, New York. Among their early work were experimental buses that utilized gasoline (Buda or Waukesha) and electric engines that could be run alone or together, a technique that could be seen as a very early ancestor to dual-mode vehicles of the modern day.

The six-cylinder engine from 1925 had a displacement of 8,991.56 cm³, with a bore of 114.3 mm and a stroke of 146.05 mm. The engine produced 110 hp. It was directly connected to a generator that had a continuous output of 40 kW. The actual drive motors were two Westinghouse electric motors, each delivering up to 28 hp at 175 volts.

In 1928, the assets of the company were purchased by the Cincinnati Car Company and the company's base was moved from Watervliet to Cincinnati, Ohio. The Versare nameplate returned in 1931 and remained until its demise in 1938.

== Products ==
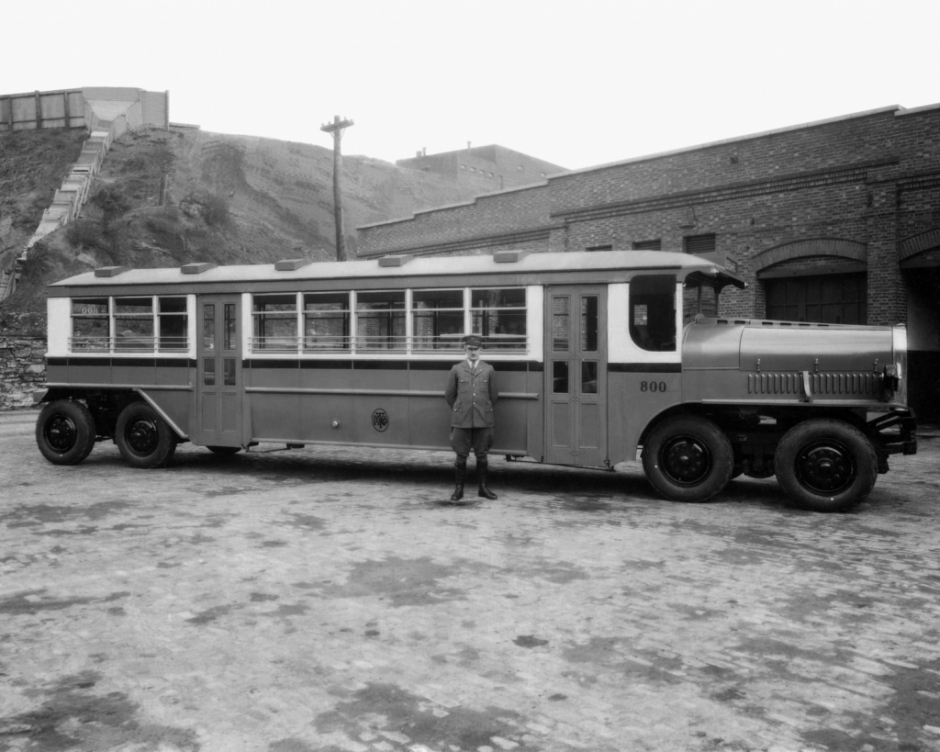
Montreal Tramways Company bus #800, the "Atwater Street Monster". This Versare gas-electric bus was used in the 1920s and 1930s on the Atwater Avenue bus route.

- "Atwater Street Monster", an 8-wheeled bus used in Montreal
- Versare Coach
- Versare 6 HC 37
