= 2009 USA Cycling Professional Tour =

The 2009 USA Cycling Professional Tour is the third year of this elite men's professional road bicycle racing series organized by USA Cycling.

Christian Vande Velde (272 points) and the Garmin/Chipotle Pro Cycling Team (711 points) are the defending champion of the overall individual and team titles, respectively.

== Events ==
The 2009 USA Cycling Professional Tour consists of the following 13 one-day races and stage races:

Dates	Race name	Location	UCI Rating	Winner	Team	Series Leader
February 14–22	AMGEN Tour of California	California	2.HC	Levi Leipheimer (USA)	Astana	Levi Leipheimer (USA)
May 31	U.S. Air Force Cycling Classic (formerly the Crystal City Classic)	Arlington County, Virginia	1.2	Shawn Milne (USA)	Team Type 1	Levi Leipheimer (USA)
June 7	TD Bank International Championship	Philadelphia, Pa.	1.HC	André Greipel (GER)	Team Columbia	Levi Leipheimer (USA)
August 16	USA Cycling Professional Criterium Championships	Downers Grove, Ill.	N/A	Ben Kersten (AUS)	Fly-V Australia	Levi Leipheimer (USA)
August 29	USA Cycling Professional Time Trial Championships	Greenville, South Carolina	CN	David Zabriskie (USA)	Team Garmin–Slipstream	Levi Leipheimer (USA)
August 30	USA Cycling Professional Road Championships	Greenville, South Carolina	CN	George Hincapie (USA)	Team Columbia	Levi Leipheimer (USA)
September 7–13	Tour of Missouri	Missouri	2.HC	David Zabriskie (USA)	Team Garmin–Slipstream	David Zabriskie (USA)
September 12	Univest Grand Prix	Souderton, Pa.	1.2	Volodymyr Starchyk (UKR)	Amore & Vita–McDonald's	David Zabriskie (USA)
