= Red Devil (interurban) =

Streetcar model built by the Cincinnati Car Company

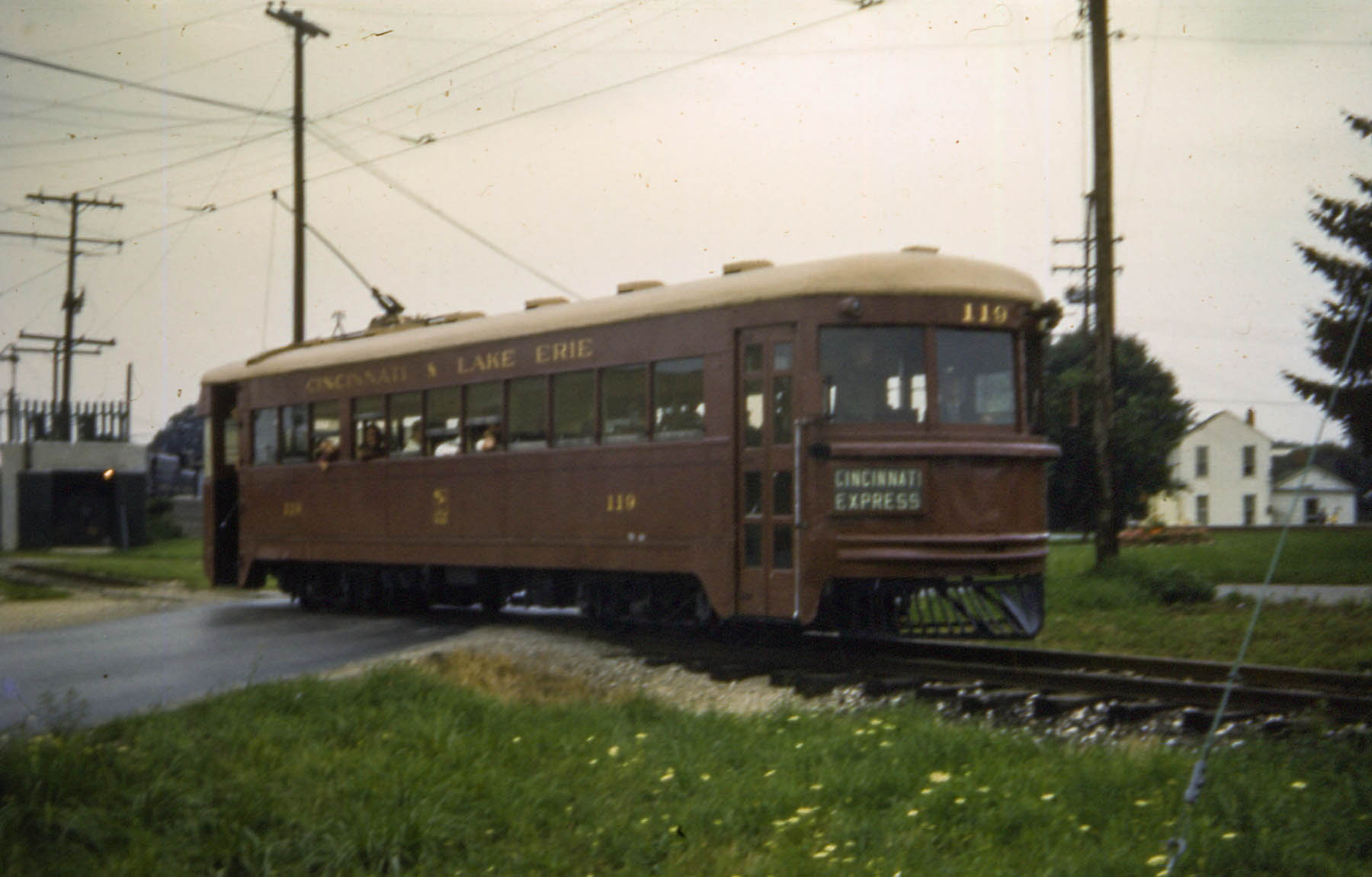
- C&LE #119 at the Ohio Railway Museum in 1966
- In service: 1929-53
- Manufacturer: Cincinnati Car Company
- Number built: 20
- Operators: Cincinnati and Lake Erie Railroad; Cedar Rapids and Iowa City Railway; Lehigh Valley Transit Company

Specifications
- Car length: 44 ft 9 in (13,640 mm)
- Width: 8 ft 10 in (2,692 mm)
- Wheel diameter: 28 in (711 mm)
- Maximum speed: 90 mph (140 km/h)
- Weight: 48,000 lb (22,000 kg)
- Traction motors: 4 × 100 hp (75 kW)
- Track gauge: 4 ft 8 1/2 in (1,435 mm) standard gauge

The Red Devil was a high-speed interurban streetcar built by the Cincinnati Car Company for the Cincinnati and Lake Erie Railroad (C&LE) in 1929–1930. They saw service throughout Ohio in the 1930s. After the failure of the C&LE in 1939 they saw service with the Cedar Rapids and Iowa City Railway (CRANDIC) and the Lehigh Valley Transit Company. Several have been preserved.

== Design ==
The management of the newly-formed interurban Cincinnati and Lake Erie Railroad wanted to replace its heavy and aging interurban coaches with new ones that would be lighter, lower, passenger comfortable, and power efficient. C&LE staff worked with the Cincinnati Car Company to design what came to be called "The Red Devils." These interurban cars were among the first to be constructed partially with aluminum. The frame was steel and the body panels were aluminum. They had leather bucket seats, a luggage compartment, toilet, subdued lighting, and up to 44 seats depending upon format.

This construction ultimately proved to have some weaknesses. The riveting of aluminum plates to a steel frame produced an electrolytic reaction that gave rise to corrosion in the side panels and the front and rear dashers. The C&LE eventually replaced some of the aluminum panels with steel. The cars featured Art deco styling and a distinctive bright red paint scheme. Half of the cars were delivered as parlor cars with first class living room style lighting and seating in the rear.

== Service ==
The Red Devil's top design speed was 90 mph (145 km/h). but in scheduled operation with frequent stops, side of road track location, and rough track, it did not run this fast. Not only was it the fastest interurban car design of its time, it outpaced even the fastest conventional train in commercial traffic, the 80 mph (129 km/h) Cheltenham Spa Express and was almost as fast as the German 160 km/h (99 mph) Fliegender Hamburger, which was inaugurated in 1933. (see Land speed record for rail vehicles#Scheduled trains).

The Red Devils ran Cincinnati to Dayton, then to Toledo, and finally to Detroit, a trip close to 270 miles in length.

In 1930, a race was organized between a Red Devil and an airplane. The publicity stunt's result was that the interurban car ran at 97 mph (156 km/h) – and won.

Competition with the growing population of automobiles riding on a constantly expanding paved state highway system plus the devastating negative financial impact of the Depression led to a decline in C&LE passenger business starting in the early 1930s and continuing through the rest of the decade. The C&LE's freight business, which eventually was supporting the C&LE, collapsed when its last interchange partner, the Toledo to Cleveland Lake Shore Electric interurban, went out of business in 1938. The C&LE ceased operation in 1939. and the innovative Red Devils were sold after abandonment: six to the Cedar Rapids and Iowa City Railway (CRANDIC) and thirteen to the Lehigh Valley Transit Company.
