= 2008 USA Cycling Professional Tour =

The 2008 USA Cycling Professional Tour is the second year of this elite men's professional road bicycle racing series organized by USA Cycling.

Levi Leipheimer (381 points) and the Discovery Channel Pro Cycling Team (810 points) are the defending champion of the overall individual and team titles, respectively.

== Events ==
The 2008 USA Cycling Professional Tour consists of the following 16 one-day races and stage races:

Dates	Race name	Location	UCI Rating	Winner	Team	Series Leader
February 17–24	AMGEN Tour of California	California	2.HC	Levi Leipheimer (USA)	Team Astana	Levi Leipheimer (USA)
April 13	U.S. Open Cycling Championships	Richmond, Virginia	1.1	postponed	postponed	
April 21–27	Tour de Georgia	Georgia	2.HC	Kanstantsin Sivtsov (BLR)	Team High Road	Levi Leipheimer (USA)
May 4	U.S. Air Force Cycling Classic (formerly the Crystal City Classic)	Arlington, Virginia	1.2	Lucas Sebastian Haedo (ARG)	Colavita	Levi Leipheimer (USA)
May 25	Tour de Leelanau	Traverse City, Mich.	2.1	Taylor Tolleson (USA)	BMC Racing Team	Levi Leipheimer (USA)
June 3	Commerce Bank Lehigh Valley Classic (formerly Lancaster Classic)	Allentown, Pa.	1.1	Yuri Metlushenko (UKR)	Amore & Vita – McDonald's	Levi Leipheimer (USA)
June 5	Commerce Bank Reading Classic	Reading, Pa.	1.1	Óscar Sevilla (ESP)	Rock Racing	Levi Leipheimer (USA)
June 8	Commerce Bank International Championship	Philadelphia, Pa.	1.HC	Matti Breschel (DEN)	Team CSC	Levi Leipheimer (USA)
June 24–29	American Eagle Outfitters Tour of Pennsylvania (U-25)	Pennsylvania	2.2	David Veilleux (CAN)	Kelly Benefit Strategies/Medifast Pro Cycling	Levi Leipheimer (USA)
August 8–10	Rochester Omnium (formerly the Rochester Twilight Criterium)	Rochester, N.Y.	1.2	Dominique Rollin (USA)	Toyota United	Levi Leipheimer (USA)
August 17	USA Cycling Professional Criterium Championships	Downers Grove, Ill.	N/A	Rahsaan Bahati (USA)	Rock Racing	Levi Leipheimer (USA)
August 22–24	Colorado Stage International Cycle Classic	Colorado	N/A	CANCELED		
August 30	USA Cycling Professional Time Trial Championships	Greenville, South Carolina	CN	David Zabriskie (USA)	Team Garmin–Chipotle	Levi Leipheimer (USA)
August 31	USA Cycling Professional Road Championships	Greenville, South Carolina	CN	Tyler Hamilton (USA)	Rock Racing	Levi Leipheimer (USA)
September 6	Univest Grand Prix	Souderton, Pa.	1.2	Lucas Euser (USA)	Team Garmin–Chipotle	Levi Leipheimer (USA)
September 8–14	Tour of Missouri	Missouri	2.1	Christian Vande Velde (USA)	Team Garmin–Chipotle	Christian Vande Velde (USA)
