= William D. Middleton =

American journalist

- Born: March 25, 1928; Davenport, Iowa, U.S.
- Died: July 10, 2011 (aged 83); Livonia, New York, U.S.
- Occupation: Writer

William D. Middleton (March 25, 1928 – July 10, 2011) was an American reporter, writer and photographer. The majority of his work was on the subject of railroad history and operation. He published over 20 books and approximately 700 articles for magazines and newspapers, accompanied by photographs. His work as a photographer was profiled in the Spring 2011 issue of Classic Trains magazine.

He was one of the lead editors, along with George M. Smerk and Roberta L. Diehl, for the Encyclopedia of North American Railroads.

== Published works ==
=== Books ===
During his lifetime, Middleton wrote or co-wrote many books, including:

- The Interurban Era. Milwaukee: Kalmbach Publishing Co. 1961. OCLC 4357897.
- North Shore: America's Fastest Interurban. San Marino, CA: Golden West Books. 1964. OCLC 476869.
- The Time of the Trolley. Kalmbach Publishing Co. 1967. OCLC 258974.
- The Railroad Scene. San Marino, CA: Golden West Books. 1969. ISBN 978-0870950001. OCLC 86378.
- South Shore: The Last Interurban. San Marino, CA: Golden West Books. 1970. ISBN 978-0870950032. OCLC 104029.
- When the Steam Railroads Electrified (1st ed.). Milwaukee: Kalmbach Publishing Co. 1974. ISBN 978-0890240281. OCLC 1206012.
- Grand Central, the World's Greatest Railway Terminal. San Marino, CA: Golden West Books. 1977. ISBN 978-0870950711. OCLC 3167060.
- North Shore: America's Fastest Interurban. 1979.
- Traction Classics: The Interurbans : The Great Wood and Steel Cars. San Marino, CA: Golden West Books. 1983. ISBN 978-0870950858. OCLC 9970163.
- Traction Classics: The High Speed and Deluxe Interurban Cars. 1985. ISBN 978-0870950896.
- Traction Classics: The Interurbans Extra Fast and Extra Fare Volume Two. Golden West Books. 1985.
- Traction Classics: Interurban Freight Volume Three. San Marino, CA: Golden West Books. 1985. ISBN 9780870950858.
- China by Rail. Glendale, CA: Trans-Anglo Books. 1986. ISBN 978-0870460746. OCLC 13008024.
- Carlson, Norman, ed. (1989). From Bullets to BART. Chicago, IL: Central Electric Railfans' Association. ISBN 978-0915348275. OCLC 20860638.
- North American Commuter Rail. Pasadena, CA: Pentrex. 1994. ISBN 978-0685722787. OCLC 32665882.
- North America's 50 largest transit markets. Omaha, NE: Transit connections. 1994. OCLC 35527438.
- Manhattan Gateway: New York's Pennsylvania Station (Golden Years of Railroading). Waukesha, WI: Kalmbach Publishing Co. 1996. ISBN 978-0890241776. OCLC 35667727.
- Landmarks on the Iron Road: Two Centuries of North American Railroad Engineering (Railroads Past and Present). Bloomington, IN: Indiana University Press. 1999. ISBN 978-0253335593. OCLC 40545446.
- South Shore: The Last Interurban : Revised Second Edition (Railroads Past and Present) (2nd ed.). Indiana University Press. 1999. ISBN 978-0253335333.
- "Yet there isn't a train I wouldn't take": Railway Journeys by William D. Middleton. Bloomington, IN: Indiana University Press. 2000. ISBN 978-0253336996. OCLC 42435001.
- The Bridge at Quebec. Bloomington, IN: Indiana University Press. 2001. ISBN 978-0253337610. OCLC 44732284.
- The Pennsylvania Railroad Under Wire (Golden Years of Railroading). Waukesha, WI: Kalmbach Publishing Co. 2002. ISBN 978-0890246177. OCLC 51208625.
- When the Steam Railroads Electrified, 2nd Revised Edition (2nd ed.). Indiana University Press. 2002. ISBN 978-0253339799.
- The Last Interurbans (Bulletin 136 of the Central Electric Railfans' Association). Chicago, IL: Central Electric Railfans' Association. 2003. ISBN 978-0915348367. OCLC 53141695.
- Metropolitan Railways: Rapid Transit in America (Railroads Past and Present). Bloomington, IN: Indiana University Press. 2003. ISBN 978-0253341792. OCLC 49681301.
- Frank Julian Sprague: Electrical Inventor and Engineer. Indiana University Press. 2009. ISBN 978-0253353832.
- On Railways Far Away. Bloomington, IN: Indiana University Press. 2012. ISBN 9780253005915. OCLC 929632211.

=== Magazine articles ===
During his lifetime, Middleton wrote or co-wrote many articles, including the following:

- "North Shore in Sunset". Trains. Waukesha, Wisconsin: Kalmbach Publishing. 1963.
- Middleton, William D. (1984). "Electric Railway Freight". Railroad History. 151 (151). Railway and Locomotive Historical Society: 16–69. JSTOR 43521044.
- Middleton, William D. (2000). "Diesel Railcar: A Look Ahead". Railroad History (Millennium Special). Railway and Locomotive Historical Society: 143–154. JSTOR 43522199.
- Middleton, William D. (2002). "Rails across the Hudson: Getting Across the Barrier, Then and Now". Railroad History. 186 (186). Railway and Locomotive Historical Society: 12–42. JSTOR 43524108.
- Middleton, William D. (2005). "First Class for Fish". Railroad History. 192 (192). Railway and Locomotive Historical Society: 56–63. JSTOR 43525105.
- Middleton, William D. (2005). "From Russia With Love". Railroad History. 193 (193). Railway and Locomotive Historical Society: 40–47. JSTOR 43524374.
- Middleton, William D. (2005). "Where is Amtrak heading: A Debate". Railroad History. 193 (193). Railway and Locomotive Historical Society: 100–111. JSTOR 43524411.
- Middleton, William D.; Reutter, Mark (2006). "Railroaders in Bronze and Stone". Railroad History. 195 (195). Railway and Locomotive Historical Society: 78–87. JSTOR 43522771.
- Middleton, William D.; Reutter, Mark; Swanberg, J. W. (2007). "Fast Trains and FASTER". Railroad History. 196 (196). Railway and Locomotive Historical Society: 22–41. JSTOR 43522819.
- "When the "Red Devil" Went Out in Style". Timeline. 4 (24). Ohio Historical Society. 2007.
- Middleton, William D. (2008). "Electrification over the Sierra Nevada". Railroad History. 199 (199). Railway and Locomotive Historical Society: 8–15. JSTOR 43524587.
- Middleton, William D.; Dow, Andrew (2009). "Reaching 200: High-Speed Trains at 200 km/h and 200 mph". Railroad History. 200 (200). Railway and Locomotive Historical Society: 36–47. JSTOR 43504591.
