= Cedar Rapids and Iowa City Railway =

Shortline railroad in Iowa

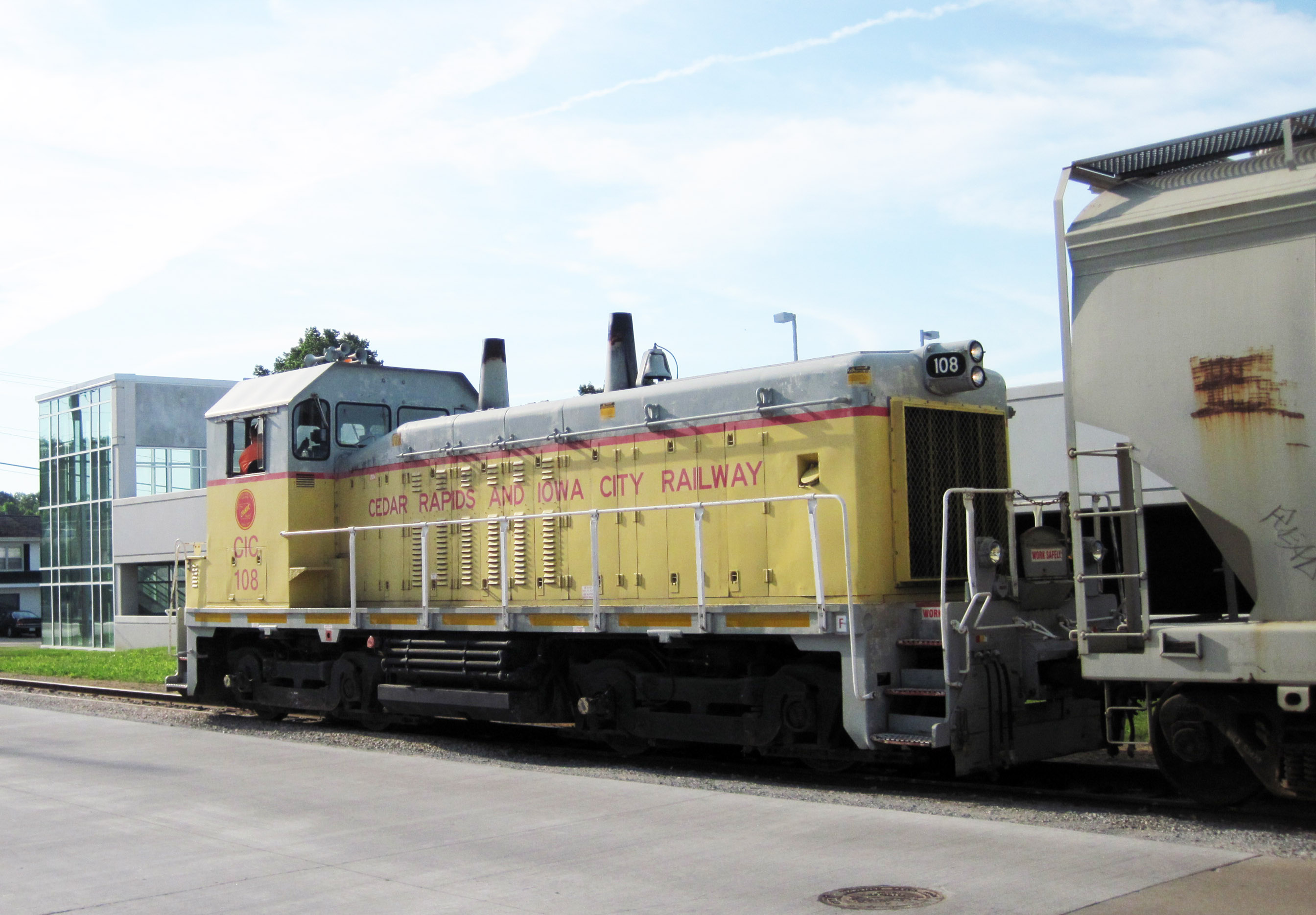
- CIC #108, an EMD SW14, in Iowa City, Iowa

Overview
- Headquarters: Cedar Rapids, Iowa
- Reporting mark: CIC
- Locale: Iowa
- Dates of operation: 1904–

Technical
- Track gauge: 4 ft 8 1/2 in (1,435 mm) standard gauge
- Electrification: abandoned about 1953

The Cedar Rapids and Iowa City Railway (reporting mark CIC), also known as the CRANDIC, is a Class III railroad operating in the US state of Iowa.

The CRANDIC currently operates 60 miles (97 km) of main line and more than 40 miles (64 km) of yard trackage in four east central Iowa counties. The Cedar Rapids and Iowa City Railway employs 90 individuals. 100,000 car loads of traffic are handled each year on the CRANDIC. The largest customers include Alliant Energy, Archer Daniels Midland, Cargill, International Paper's Cedar River mill, and Ingredion Products.

== History ==
The CRANDIC began operations in 1904, providing interurban service between Cedar Rapids, Iowa, and Iowa City, Iowa. In 1914, a line extending to Lisbon, Iowa, was completed but was abandoned in 1928. In 1939, the CRANDIC purchased six high-speed light weight interurban cars (Red Devils) from the recently abandoned Cincinnati and Lake Erie Railroad interurban, leading to the popular saying "Swing and Sway the CRANDIC Way", referring to the motion caused by high-speed running on the CRANDIC's uneven track. For similar reasons, it was also known as the "Vomit Comet". In 1953, the railroad ran its last passenger train, a charter by railfans.

While freight was important to the CRANDIC in the early years, it was better known for its passenger interurban operations. In 1952, the line operated 12 trains in each direction per day (8 on Sundays), & the journey took 47–58 minutes. Operating hours were from 5 am (8/9 am Sundays) to 12/1 am (1/2 am Monday mornings). After passenger operations were discontinued in 1953, freight became the primary source of traffic for the CRANDIC. At the same time, the electric-powered locomotives were replaced with diesel-electric models. The customer base in Cedar Rapids continued to expand with the population in the area. In 1980, with the demise of the Milwaukee Road, CRANDIC purchased the Cedar Rapids to Homestead, Iowa, portion of the Milwaukee. Also in that year, an Iowa City to Hills, Iowa portion of the former Chicago, Rock Island and Pacific Railroad was acquired by the CRANDIC. In 1996, a large locomotive and car shop was built in the southwest side of Cedar Rapids as a replacement for the original Rockford Road facility.

In late 2004, the CRANDIC chose to concentrate on its major focus, switching customers along its rail lines. A daily road freight between Cedar Rapids and Iowa City previously operated by the CRANDIC was turned over to the Iowa Interstate Railroad in August 2004. In 2005, Railway Age magazine named the CRANDIC its Short Line Railroad of the Year. Also in 2005, CRANDIC opened its third shop complex. The newest shops are located on the site of the original CRANDIC shops. The previous shops complex was sold to Archer Daniels Midland (ADM) for use as a railcar cleaning and repair shop for ADM's large fleet of rolling stock.

In 2013, CRANDIC took delivery of 8 new L4-1500XD-M switcher locomotives built by RELCO in Albia, Iowa. Each locomotive was mated to a slug unit; due to the railroad's tight curves, constructed when the railroad was still an interurban, six-axle locomotives cannot be employed. The locomotives were numbered 201-208 and the slugs were numbered 301-308.

=== Proposed passenger service ===
Plans to reintroduce passenger rail service along an 8.2 miles (13.2 km) segment of the CRANDIC corridor between North Liberty, Coralville, and the University of Iowa campus in Iowa City emerged in the early 2010s. The preferred alternative called for a "Pop-Up Metro" pilot service that would utilize British Rail Class 230 battery-electric multiple units (BEMUs) repurposed from former London Underground D78 Stock. If funded, pilot service would begin in 2026. The proposal was canceled in January 2025.

Preceded by Nittany and Bald Eagle Railroad	Short Line Railroad of the Year; 2005	Succeeded by Georgia Midland Railroad
