= Souderton, Pennsylvania =

Borough of Pennsylvania, US

Borough of Souderton
- Borough
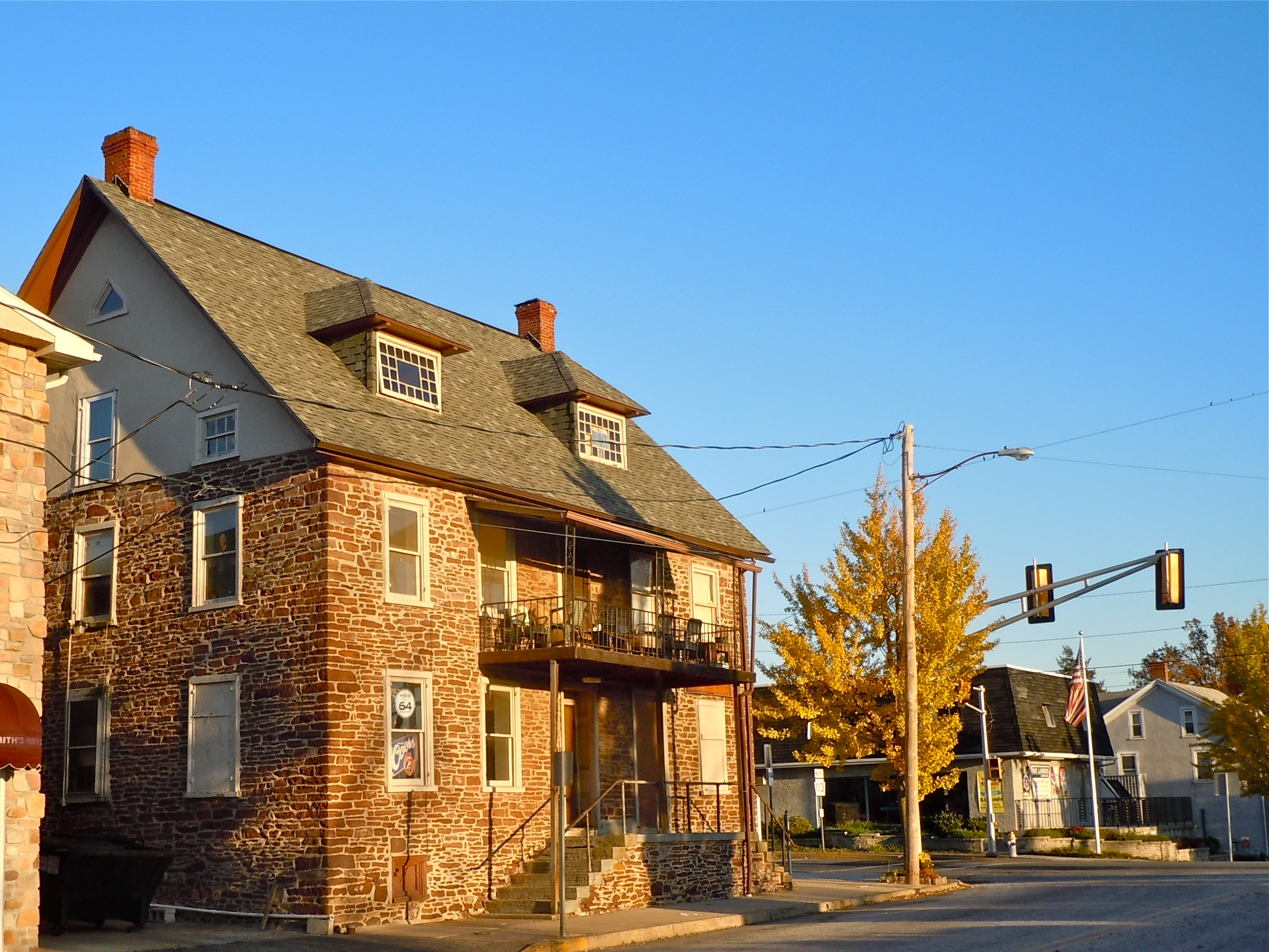
- Souderton Historic District

- Seal

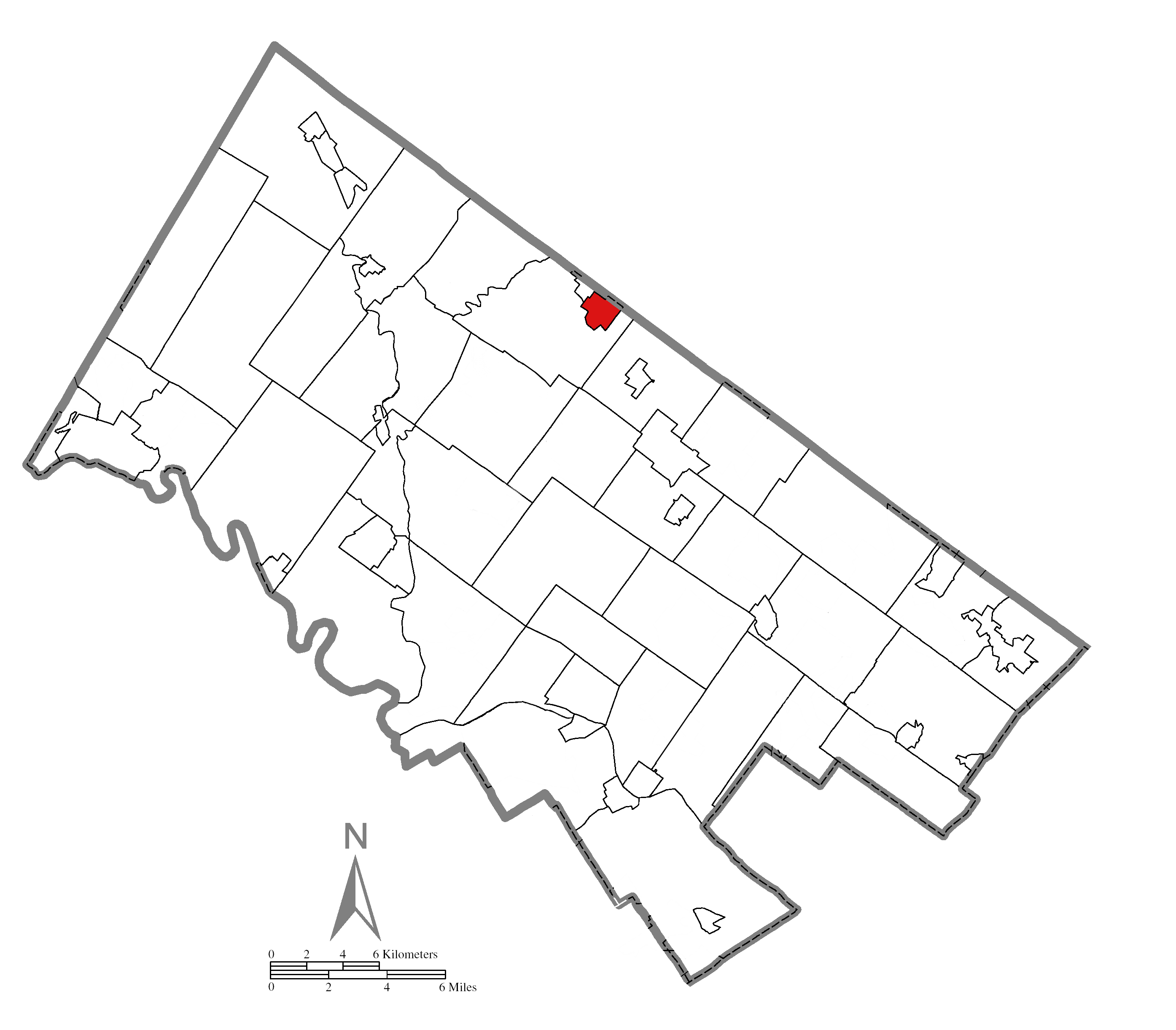
- Location of Souderton in Montgomery County, Pennsylvania.

- Location of Souderton in Pennsylvania Souderton (the United States)
- Coordinates: 40°18′37″N 75°19′18″W
- Country: United States
- State: Pennsylvania
- County: Montgomery
- Incorporated: 1887

Government
  - Type: Council-manager
  - Mayor: Dan Yocum

Area
  - Total: 1.12 sq mi (2.90 km^{2})
  - Land: 1.12 sq mi (2.90 km^{2})
  - Water: 0 sq mi (0.00 km^{2})
- Elevation: 400 ft (120 m)

Population (2010)
  - Total: 6,618
  - Estimate (2019): 7,082
  - Density: 6,315.4/sq mi (2,438.39/km^{2})
- Time zone: UTC-5 (EST)
  - Summer (DST): UTC-4 (EDT)
- ZIP code: 18964
- Area codes: 215, 267 and 445
- FIPS code: 42-71856
- Website: www.soudertonborough.org

Souderton is a borough in Montgomery County, Pennsylvania, United States. The population was 7,246 in 2022.

Souderton formerly hosted the end of the annual Bucks County Classic, a professional bicycle race.

== History ==
Souderton occupies a land that was historically inhabited by the Lenni Lenape for thousands of years. The first Welsh settlers, John Mathias and Thomas Morgan, established their settlement in the vicinity around 1710, near the intersection of School Lane and Chestnut Street where Souderton stands today. The town was originally named Welshtown, because of its Welsh influence.

The first person to own land in what is now Souderton was a man by the name of George Stuart. He built a log cabin in or around what is now known as West Street Park. Stuart owned many acres and began selling them off in tracts. In 1734, he sold 1,000 acres to George Cressman, which eventually became the Borough of Souderton. This parcel of land was approximately bounded by what are now Reliance Road, County Line Road, Cherry Lane, and Cowpath Road.

In 1755, 225 acres were sold to German immigrant Johannes 'John' Benner.

In 1835, Henry O. Souder and his spouse Hannah established their initial homestead situated at the intersection of present-day Main and Chestnut Streets. Souder, known for his entrepreneurial spirit, also possessed a lumber mill located on Main Street. The name Souderton is prefigured in a map of 1847 as Souder's Lumberyard, as Henry had own a lumber mill located on main street.

Souderton initially flourished as an agricultural community, primarily focused on farming activities. However, the introduction of the railroad facilitated the borough's expansion, fostering both industrial growth and community development. Industries such as textiles and cigar manufacturing contributed to Souderton's prosperity and population increase. Several major cigar manufacturers established factories in the area during this period.

On June 6, 1887, residents of Souderton applied for a charter of incorporation to the Montgomery County Court. The charter was granted on December 15, 1887. At the time of incorporation, the population was about 600.

The Souderton Historic District was listed on the National Register of Historic Places in 2011.

== Geography ==
Souderton is located at 40°18′37″N 75°19′18″W (40.310215, -75.321682).

According to the United States Census Bureau, the borough has a total area of 1.1 square miles (2.9 km^{2}), all land. The terrain consists of gently rolling hills, with some steeper hills in the downtown area, and flat terrain throughout.

=== Neighboring municipalities ===
Souderton is bordered by:

- Franconia Township on the east, southeast and south
- Telford borough on the northwest
- Hilltown Township in Bucks County across County Line Road on the northeast

Some adjacent areas in Hilltown Township, Bucks County, including Calvary Church, have a Souderton postal address.

=== Climate ===
Souderton has a hot-summer humid continental climate (Dfa) and average monthly temperatures range from 29.5 °F in January to 74.1 °F in July. The local hardiness zone is 6b.

== Politics and government ==
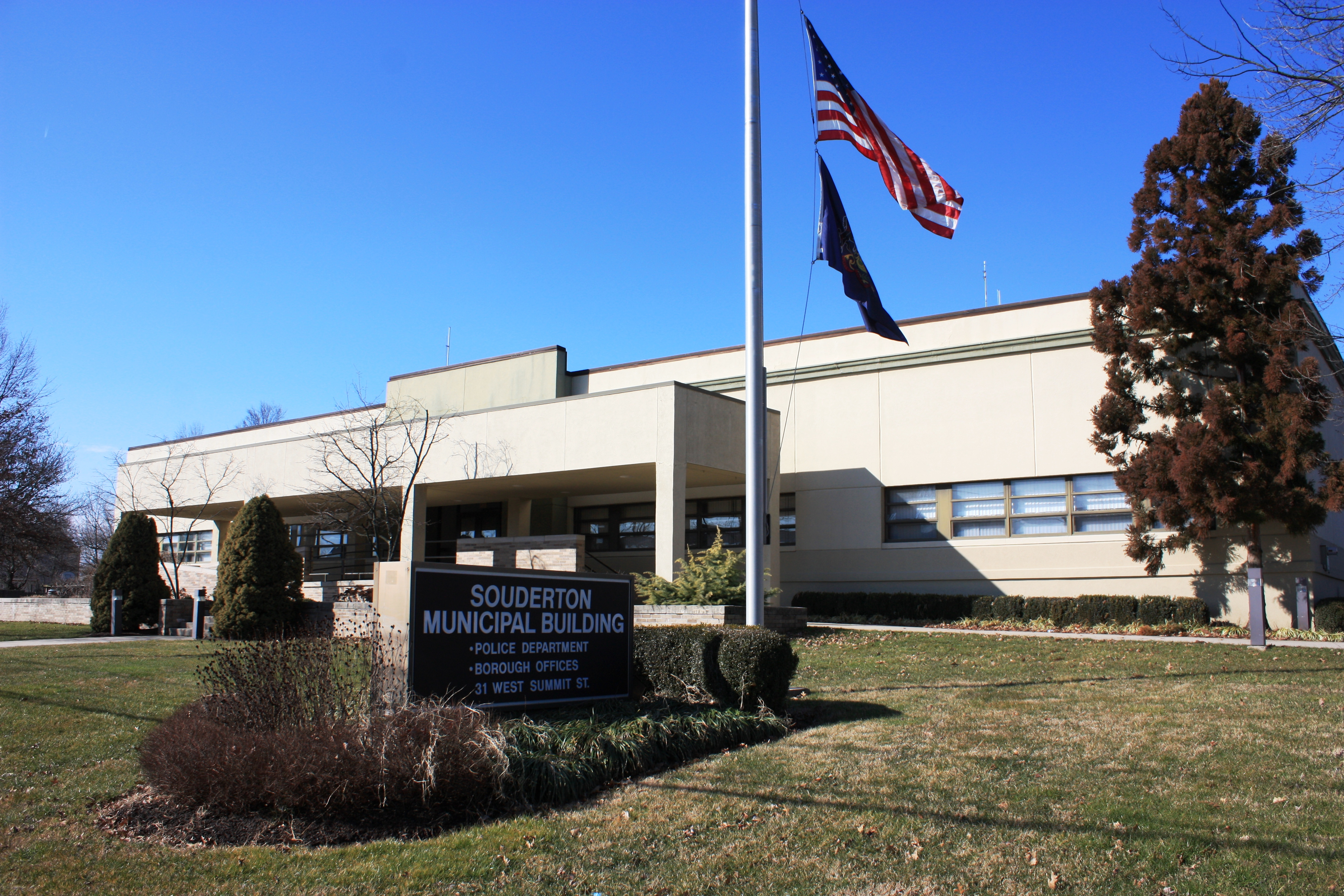
Souderton Borough Building

Souderton has a city manager form of government with a mayor and a nine-member borough council. Souderton's current borough councilors are:

- Matthew J. DiNenna-Ward 1
- Richard M. Walczak-Ward 1
- Matthew Sholly-Ward 1
- Tracy W. Burke-Ward 2 - President
- Julie Munden-Ward 2 - President Pro-Tem
- Daryl Littlefield-Ward 2
- Edward Huber-Ward 3 - Vice-President
- Donna Rogers-Ward 3
- Courtnee L. Wampole-Ward 3

The mayor is Daniel L. Yocum. Souderton also has two appointed Junior Councilors, who are appointed when under 18 years of age and serve a one-year term, without voting privileges. The current Junior Councilors are Estrela Sadiboko and Elijah Steglik. The Borough Manager is P. Michael Coll.

The borough is represented by the following officials:

- Brian Fitzpatrick (R), Pennsylvania's 1st congressional district
- Steve Malagari (D), Pennsylvania's 53rd Representative District
- Maria Collett (D), Pennsylvania's 12th Senatorial District
- Dave McCormick (R), United States Senator from Pennsylvania
- John Fetterman (D), United States Senator from Pennsylvania

Presidential elections results
Year	Republican	Democratic
2024	50.4% 1,841	48.6% 1,774
2020	49.1% 1,767	49.3% 1,773
2016	48.7% 1,529	43.1% 1,354
2012	52.4% 1,508	45.1% 1,297
2008	48.2% 1,446	50.6% 1,520
2004	56.5% 1,259	42.8% 1,663
2000	61.6% 1,451	35.2% 830

== Arts ==
Souderton is home to Montgomery Theater, one of only three professional theaters in Montgomery County. Sitting in the historic firehouse on Main Street (Rte 113), the Theater produces five subscription-series shows each year, and offers education programs for students ages 8–18. Montgomery Theater draws people to Souderton from around the five-county area. Souderton also hosts an annual Art Jam every September, bringing artists and artisans to the borough park, and offering craft beer and wine tastings. This event is hosted by Souderton-Telford Main Streets, the non-profit organization that supports revitalization in Souderton. Souderton is the city where the band Fall River was formed. Fall River would go onto produce a total of seven albums.

== Sports ==
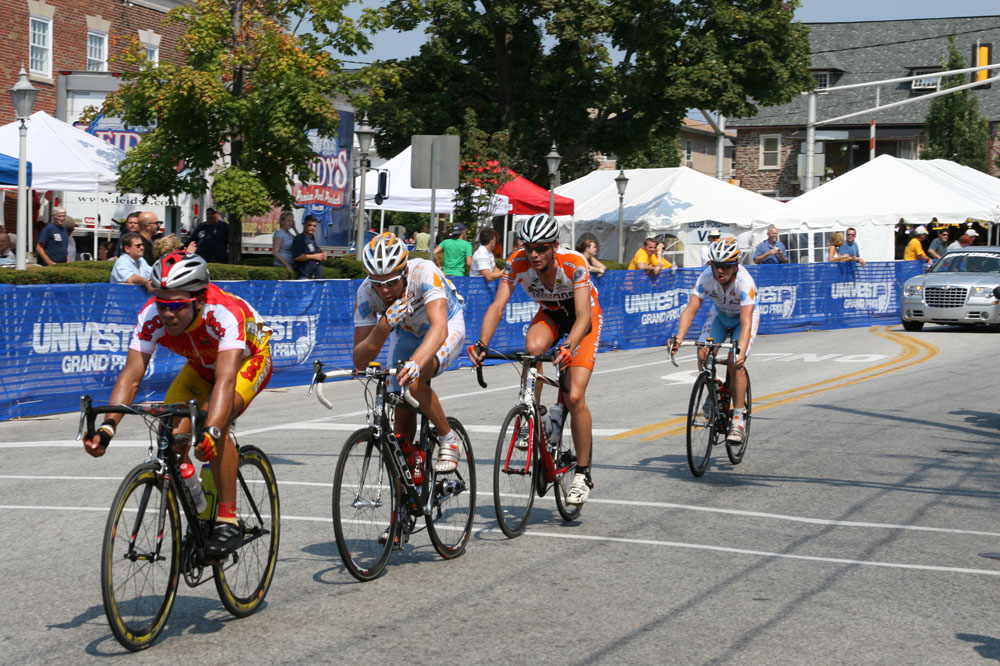
Some international and domestic professional cyclists coming through the Start/Finish for another lap of the finishing circuit in the Univest Grand Prix

Souderton was host to the Univest Grand Prix, a one-day road bicycle racing event that is part of the USA Cycling Professional Tour. It took place in early September and publicized its association with Floyd Landis. This event was part of a weekend of longer bike races in surrounding towns. Participants were from varying areas in the United States, and foreign countries, mainly European. Italian, French and Flemish teams often returned to the race annually. Although the race went professional, there were amateur races earlier in the morning for youths and adults. In 2012, the race was officially discontinued in the Souderton Borough.

Souderton is also known for its strong involvement in the baseball community, having two former players Jamie Moyer, and Erik Kratz make the MLB. The American Legion baseball team in Souderton is nationally ranked, with a 2018 rank of #18 in the country. They placed second in the state in 2018 under coach Meara. Their rival is Doylestown in nearby Bucks County.

== Demographics ==
Historical population
Census	Pop.	Note	%±
1890	679		—
1900	1,077		58.6%
1910	1,875		74.1%
1920	3,125		66.7%
1930	3,857		23.4%
1940	4,036		4.6%
1950	4,521		12.0%
1960	5,381		19.0%
1970	6,366		18.3%
1980	6,657		4.6%
1990	5,957		−10.5%
2000	6,730		13.0%
2010	6,618		−1.7%
2020	7,191		8.7%

As of the 2020 United States census, Souderton borough had a population of 7,191 with 2,737 households. This leaves a persons per household of 2.60.

Of the population, 84.7% were white, 2.1% Black or African American, 0.3% were American Indian or Alaska Native, 5.2% were Asian, 2.6% were two or more races, and 18.1% were Hispanic or Latino. There were 286 veterans living in the borough and 13.6% of the population were foreign born persons.

The owner-occupied housing unit rate for 2017-2021 was 60.1%. The median value of owner-occupied housing units was $238,900. The median monthly owner costs with a mortgage was $1,747, and those without a mortgage was $705. The median gross rent was $1,086. 94.1% of households had a computer and 89.4% of households had a broadband internet subscription. 87.5% of the population 25 years and older were high school graduates or higher and 25.7% of that same population had a bachelor's degree or higher.

10.6% of the population under 65 years old had a disability and 6.3% of the population under 65 years old were without health insurance.

The median household income was $72,448 and the per capita income for 12 months was $34,345. 8.7% of the population lived below the Poverty threshold.

== Notable people ==
- Henry Gerhard Appenzeller, a Methodist missionary who brought Protestant Christianity to Korea in 1884, was born in Souderton.
- Robert Godshall, Pennsylvania state representative, was born in Souderton.
- Steven Grasse, artist
- Donald Haldeman, the 1976 Olympic Gold Medalist in trap shooting, is from Souderton.
- Donald Hunsberger, former conductor of the Eastman Wind Ensemble and recorder for Wynton Marsalis, is from Souderton.
- Erik Kratz, Major League Baseball catcher
- Jamie Moyer, Philadelphia Phillies pitcher, was born in Sellersville, Pennsylvania, and grew up in Souderton.
- God Lives Underwater guitar player Jeff Turzo graduated from Souderton Area Senior High School in 1989.
- Bloodhound Gang bass player Jared Hasselhoff graduated from Souderton Area Senior High 1989.1

== Infrastructure ==
=== Transportation ===
==== Highways and roads ====
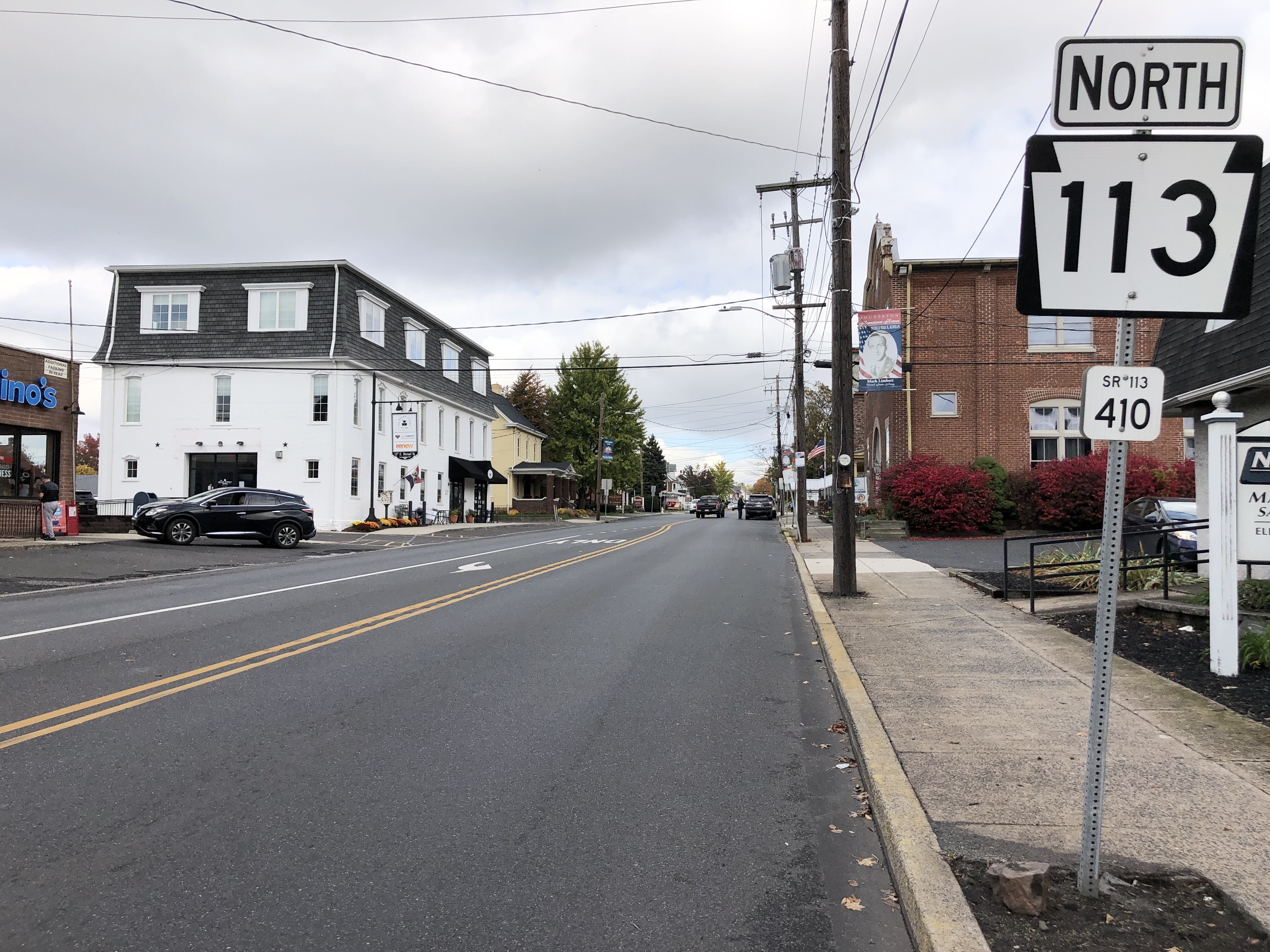
PA 113 in Souderton

As of 2006 there were 19.50 miles (31.38 km) of public roads in Souderton, of which 2.59 miles (4.17 km) were maintained by the Pennsylvania Department of Transportation (PennDOT) and 16.91 miles (27.21 km) were maintained by the borough.

Pennsylvania Route 113 passes through Souderton along Main Street and Broad Street, heading southwest to Harleysville and northeast to Silverdale. PA 113 has an interchange with the Pennsylvania Route 309 freeway to the northeast of Souderton; PA 309 heads north to Quakertown and south to Montgomeryville.

==== Railroads past and present ====
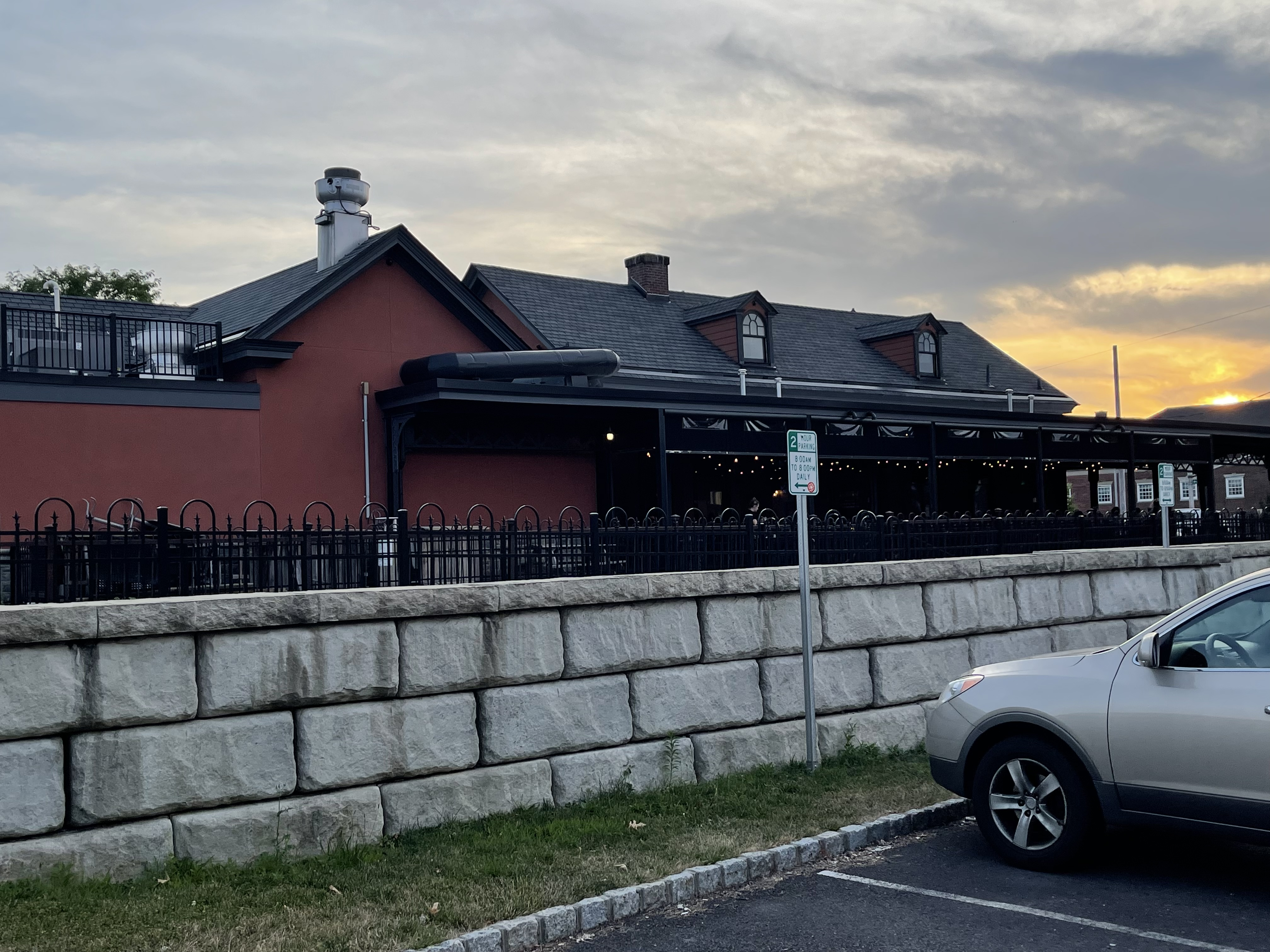
Souderton train station in 2022, now a restaurant

A rail line dating from the early 1900s (the Reading Company's former Bethlehem Branch) runs through Souderton connecting to Telford, Perkasie, Quakertown, and Bethlehem to the north and Hatfield and Lansdale to the south. This line was taken over for passenger operation from the Reading until 1981. Still active for freight, the Pennsylvania Northeastern Railroad operates through Souderton on these former SEPTA tracks. Every August, Pennsylvania Northeastern Railroad partners with New Hope and Ivyland Railroad to provide excursions to Souderton Station. Trains only use the station as a turnaround point and do not use its platform for passengers.

==== Interurban trolley ====
From 1901 until 1951, an interurban electric trolley, the Lehigh Valley Transit, operated hourly service from Souderton north to Allentown and south to Philadelphia. Its Souderton station was at the northwest corner of Broad and Main streets opposite the steam railroad Reading's Souderton station. The LVT ran north in the middle of Main Street, turned onto Summit Street and crossed the Reading on the Summit Street bridge, then angled toward Telford, its next stop. LVT had a large maintenance facility with car storage tracks reached by a track that branched from Summit Street. That building was turned into a local supermarket before it burned down in the 1990s. The LVT carried heavy passenger loads during World War 2 when gas rationing reduced automobile use, but when the war ended, passenger count collapsed and the line abandoned and began running buses.

On September 21, 1915, an incident occurred involving a freight trolley operated by the Lehigh Valley Transit Co. The trolley lost control and derailed at the intersection of Penn Street and Broad in Souderton, where the tracks made a 90-degree turn. Tragically, one of the two individuals aboard, conductor Harry W. Utt, succumbed to the accident.

==== Bus ====
SEPTA Suburban Bus Route 132 serves Souderton, heading north to Telford and south to Hatfield, Lansdale, and the Montgomery Mall in Montgomeryville.

=== Utilities ===
PPL Corporation in Allentown provides electricity to Souderton. Natural gas in Souderton is provided by PECO Energy Company, a subsidiary of Exelon. The North Penn Water Authority provides water to Souderton and surrounding areas in the North Penn Valley. The borough's Sewer Department provides sewer service to Souderton. Trash and recycling collection in Souderton is provided under contract by J.P. Mascaro & Sons.

== See also ==
- Impact of the 2019–20 coronavirus pandemic on the meat industry in the United States
