= KCKZ =

KCKZ may refer to:

- Pennridge Airport (ICAO code KCKZ)
- KCKZ (FM), a radio station (103.5 FM) licensed to serve Huntsville, Missouri, United States
