= Delbar Products, Inc. =

Historic factory and business in Pennsylvania, United States

- Industry: Automotive
- Founded: 1923; 103 years ago in Philadelphia, Pennsylvania, US
- Defunct: 2008
- Fate: Acquired by Ficosa International
- Products: Originally food processing equipment, later rear-view mirrors

Delbar Products, Inc. (1923-2008) was a multinational auto manufacturing company which mainly produced rear-view mirrors. They were originally based in Philadelphia and created food processing equipment, before moving to a factory in Perkasie, Pennsylvania and shifting to rear-view mirrors. They later opened factories in Crossville, Tennessee and Queretaro, Mexico.

== Perkasie factory ==
- Delbar Products, Inc.
- U.S. National Register of Historic Places
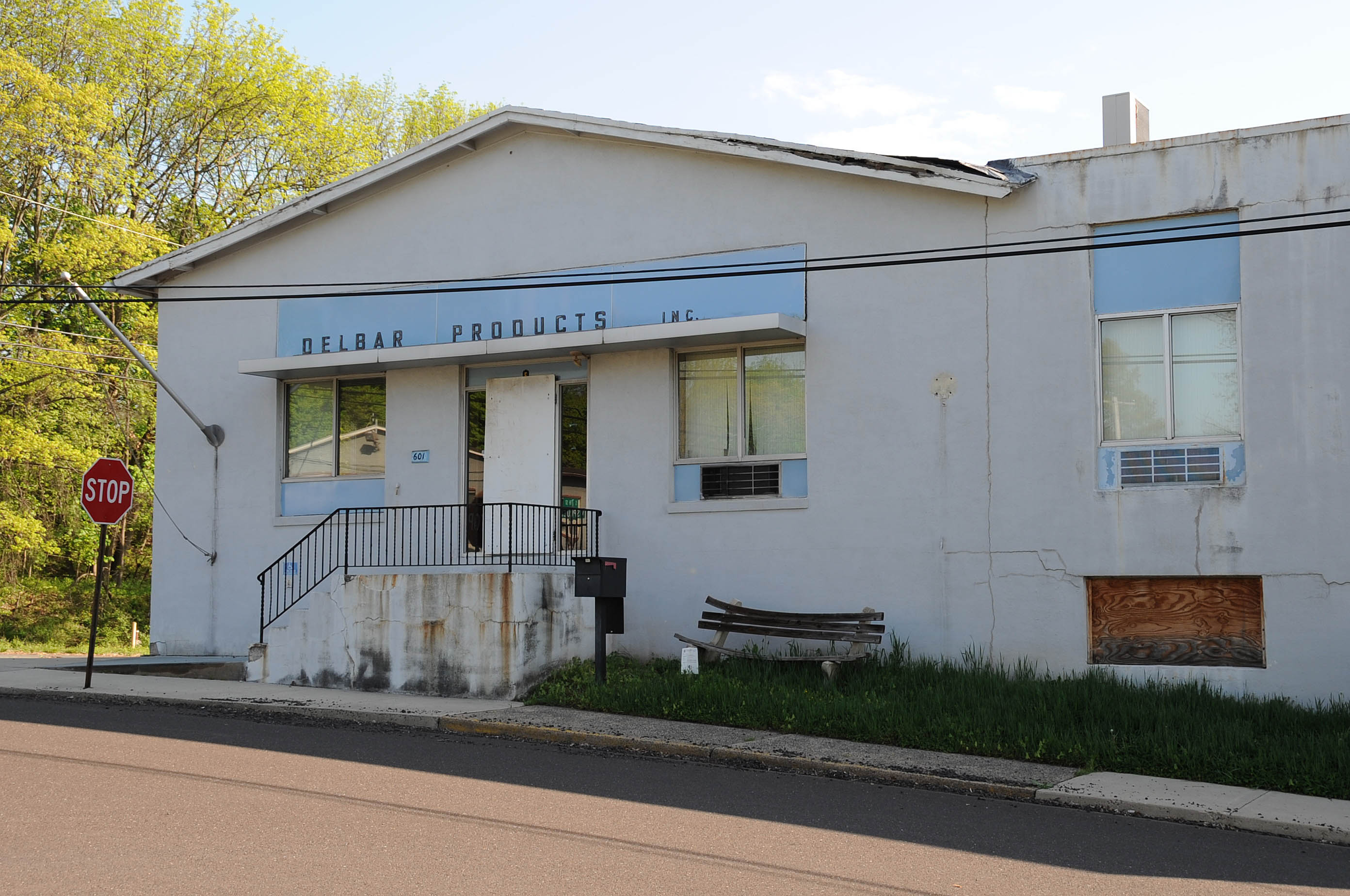
- Delbar Products in 2018

- Location within Pennsylvania Location within the United States
- Location: 601 W. Spruce Street, Perkasie, Pennsylvania
- Coordinates: 40°22′17″N 75°17′56″W
- Built: 1923
- Architectural style: Greek Revival
- NRHP reference No.: 100002369
- Added to NRHP: October 11, 2007

The factory in Perkasie, Pennsylvania, which has since been converted to an apartment building, was added to the National Register of Historic Places in 2018. It was once the second-largest employer in Upper Bucks County.
