= Megan Angelo =

American journalist and author

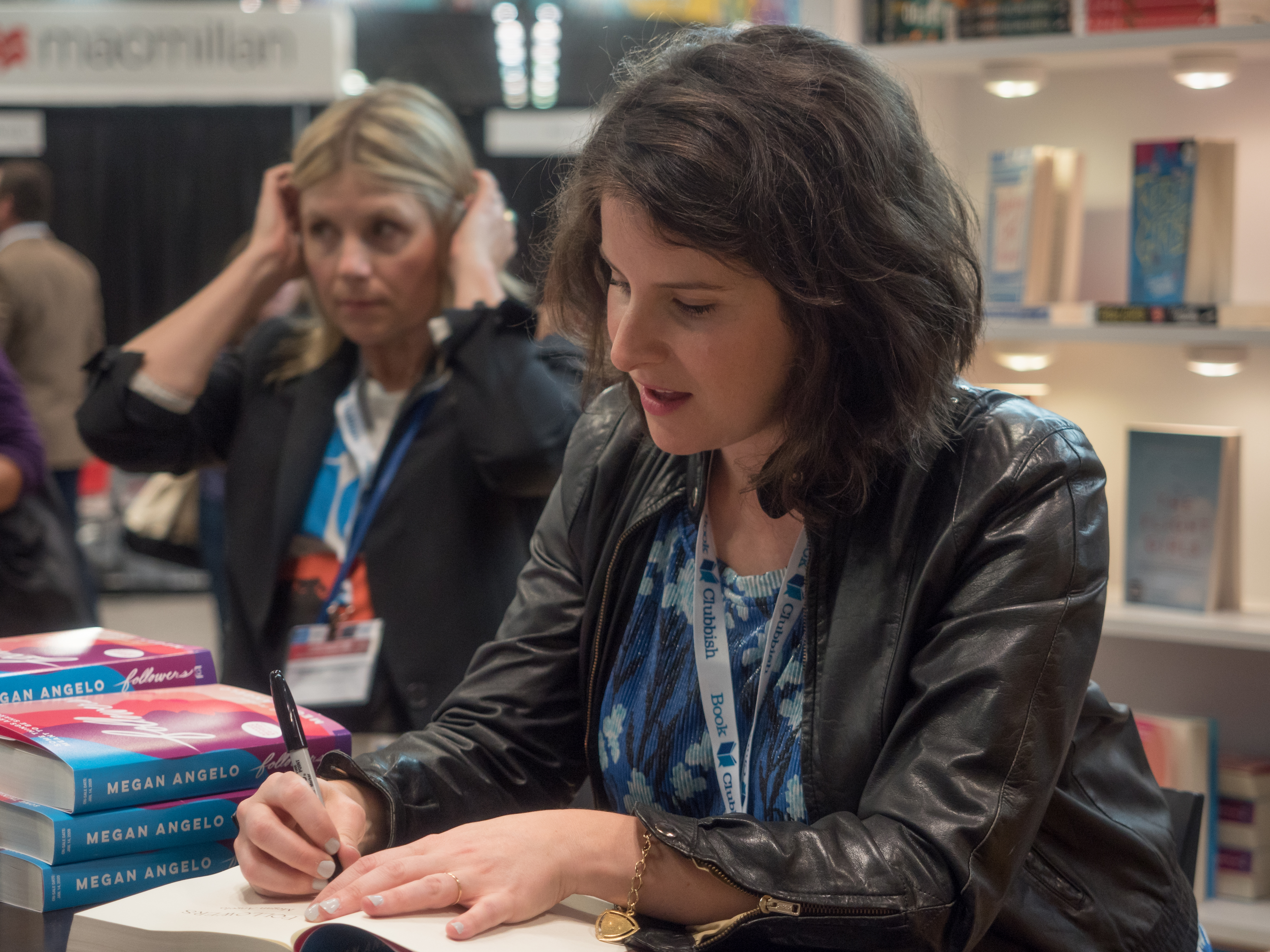
Angelo in May 2019

Megan Angelo (born ca. 1985) is an American journalist and the author of the 2020 novel Followers.

== Early life and education ==
Angelo grew up in Quakertown, Pennsylvania, and has two younger brothers. She attended St. Isidore Elementary School and Quakertown High School in the Quakertown Community School District. She graduated from Villanova University in 2006.

== Career ==
Angelo has written articles about pop culture and parenting, for outlets including Glamour, the New York Times, the Wall Street Journal, Slate, and Elle.

=== Followers ===
Angelo's novel Followers was released in hardcover by HarperCollins on January 14, 2020. It was released in paperback later that year.

Bethanne Patrick, writing for the Washington Post, called Followers "terrific writing about terrifying ideas." Kirkus Reviews gave it a starred review and noted, "Endless clever details and suspenseful plotting make this speculative-fiction debut an addictive treat." Leah Donnella, of NPR, named it one of the best realistic fiction books of 2020.
