= Priscilla Kepner Sage =

American textile and fiber artist

- Born: 1936 (age 89–90); Allentown, Pennsylvania
- Education: MFA Drake University, Columbia University, BS Pennsylvania State University,
- Known for: Three dimensional and Bas Relief Contemporary Fiber Sculpture
- Movement: American Fiber Arts Movement; Women's Art Movement
- Spouse: Charles Russell Sage
- Website: www.priscillakepnersage.com

Priscilla Kepner Sage (born 1936) is an American textile and fiber artist. She is an associate professor emeritus of art at Iowa State University. Sage's work can be found in the permanent collections of the National Quilt Museum, Brunnier Art Museum, Museum of Quilts and Textiles and the Yamanashi Prefecture International Center in Kofu, Japan. Sage's suspended sculpture, two dimensional, and bas relief work, can be found in permanent corporate, residential, and healthcare collections throughout the United States and abroad.

== Early life and education ==
Sage was born in Allentown, Pennsylvania, the daughter of Mary Schwenk Kepner and Edward Arlington Kepner. She was the middle child of three. In Allentown, she attended the Kline-Baum Art School, graduating in 1951. Her family moved to Quakertown, Pennsylvania, where she graduated from Quakertown High School in 1954. Sage graduated from Pennsylvania State University with a bachelor's of science in art in 1958. She attended Columbia University from 1959 until 1960 for graduate studies in the Teachers College.

Sage's family moved to Glen Ridge, New Jersey in 1956. From 1959 to 1962, she taught art in the West Orange, New Jersey school district. In 1962, she left New Jersey to move to Ames, Iowa. Sage attended the Iowa State University for graduate studies while working as an art teacher in Ames. She and her husband moved to Santa Barbara, California for from 1967 until 1969, returning to Ames. Sage completed her master's degree in sculpture from Drake University in 1981.

== Career ==
Sage is a fourth-generation textile artist. She has traveled to Japan, Guatemala, Ghana, and India for further textile study. Her first solo exhibit was in 1965 at Grinnell College, Iowa. She was one of 48 American artists selected to exhibit in "The Definitive Contemporary Quilt", a collection of 72 works that toured the country in the 1990s.

In September 2008, The Brunnier Art Museum exhibited a retrospective of Sage's work from 1958 to 2008. The exhibit was titled "Priscilla Sage 1958-2008 Fifty Years of Sculpture". Her 2020 work "Floating Worlds" is part of "Contemplating Japan" at the Brunnier Art Museum.

Sage was an arts educator at Drake University for 18 years. She subsequently taught at Iowa State University from 1984 to 2000. She retired as an associate professor from Iowa State University in 2000.

== Personal life ==
Priscilla Sage married Charles Russell Sage in 1960. They have two children. Sage is involved in women's rights and women art activism.
