= South Perkasie Covered Bridge =

- U.S. National Register of Historic Places
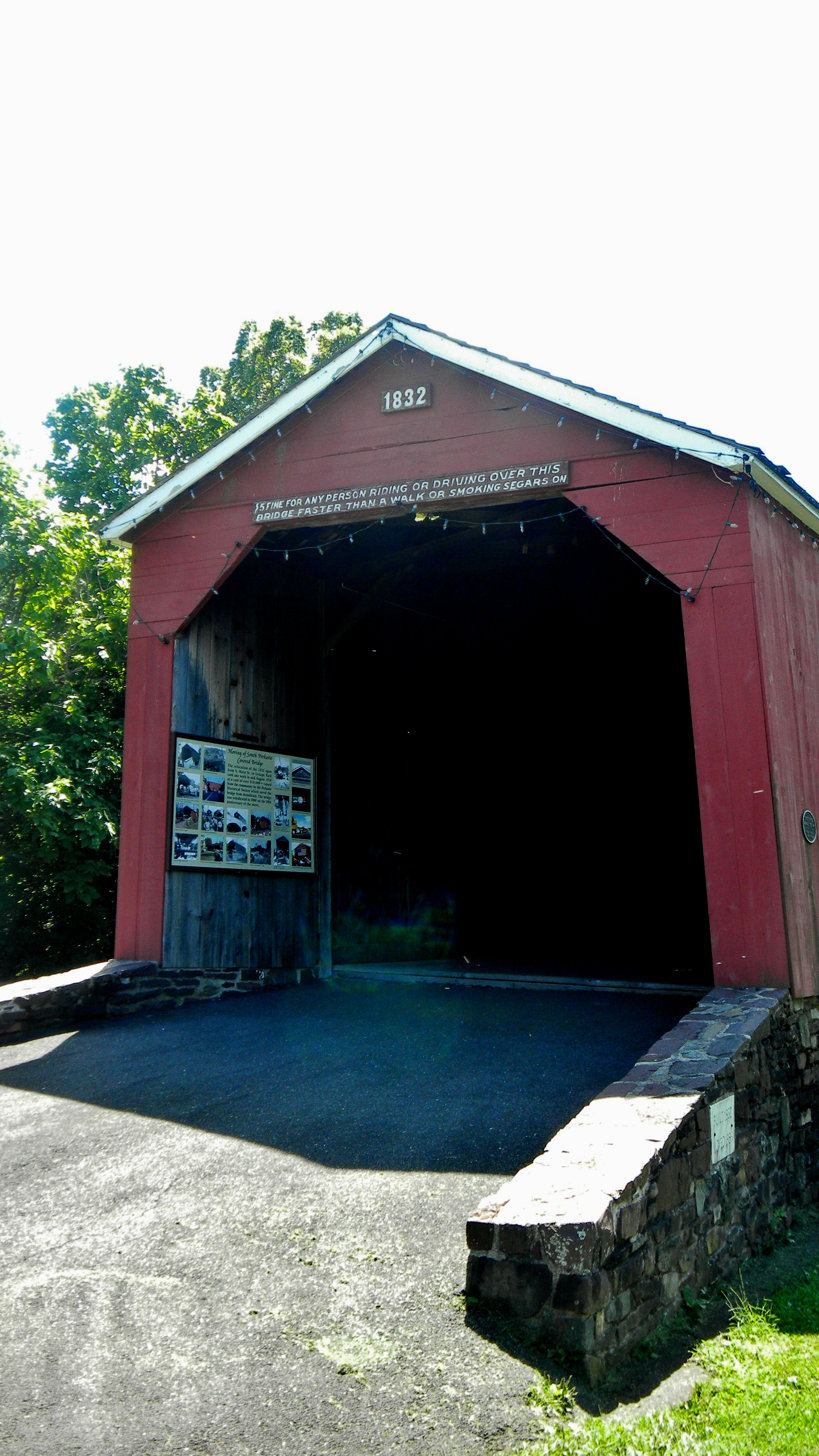
- South Perkasie Covered Bridge, August 2011

- Location within Pennsylvania Location within the United States
- Location: S of Perkasie in Lenape Park, South Perkasie/Perkasie Townships, Perkasie, Pennsylvania
- Coordinates: 40°22′3″N 75°17′43″W
- Area: 0 acres (0 ha)
- Built: 1832
- Architectural style: Town truss
- MPS: Covered Bridges of the Delaware River Watershed TR
- NRHP reference No.: 80003441
- Added to NRHP: December 1, 1980

The South Perkasie Covered Bridge is an historic wooden covered bridge in Perkasie, Bucks County, Pennsylvania, United States.

The oldest covered bridge in Bucks County, it was added to the National Register of Historic Places on December 1, 1980.

== History and architectural features ==
Built in 1832, this historic structure is a 93-foot-long (28 m), Town truss covered bridge that once crossed Pleasant Spring Creek, but was moved and rededicated on August 15, 1959 by Congressman Willard S. Curtin as a feature in Lenape Park. It is the oldest covered bridge in Bucks County.

The bridge was heavily damaged by the remnants of Hurricane Ida in September 2021.

== Gallery ==
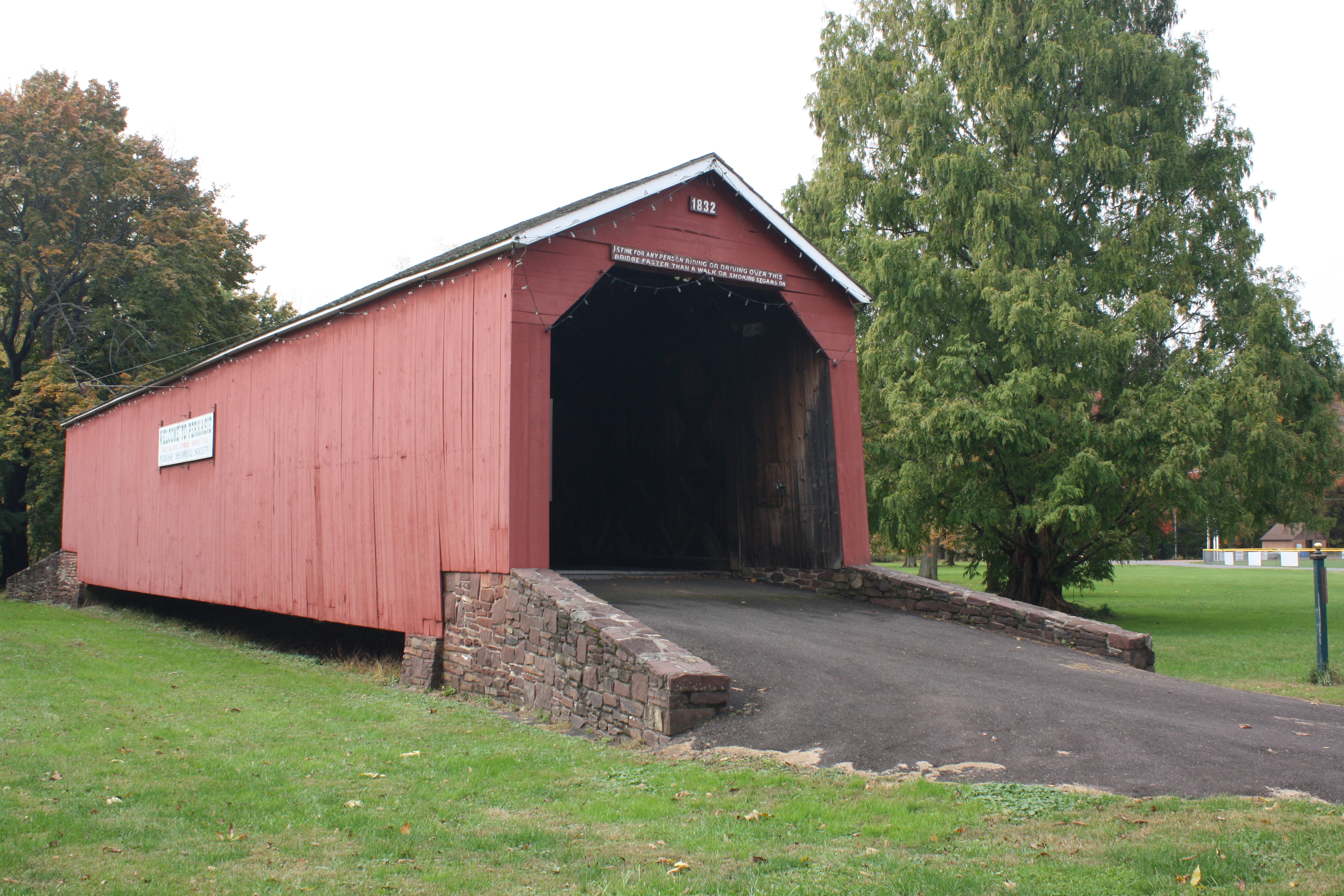
East side

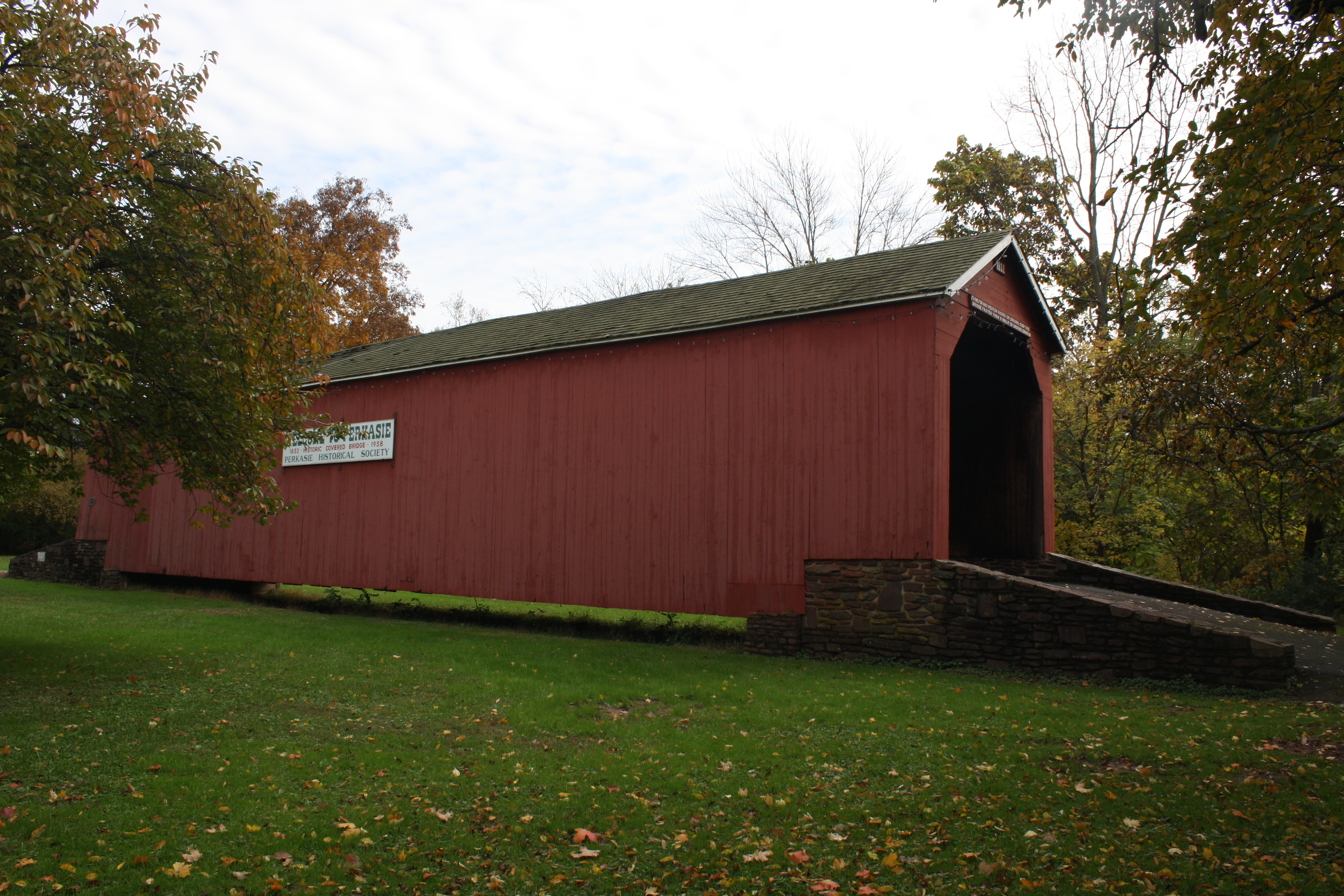
West side

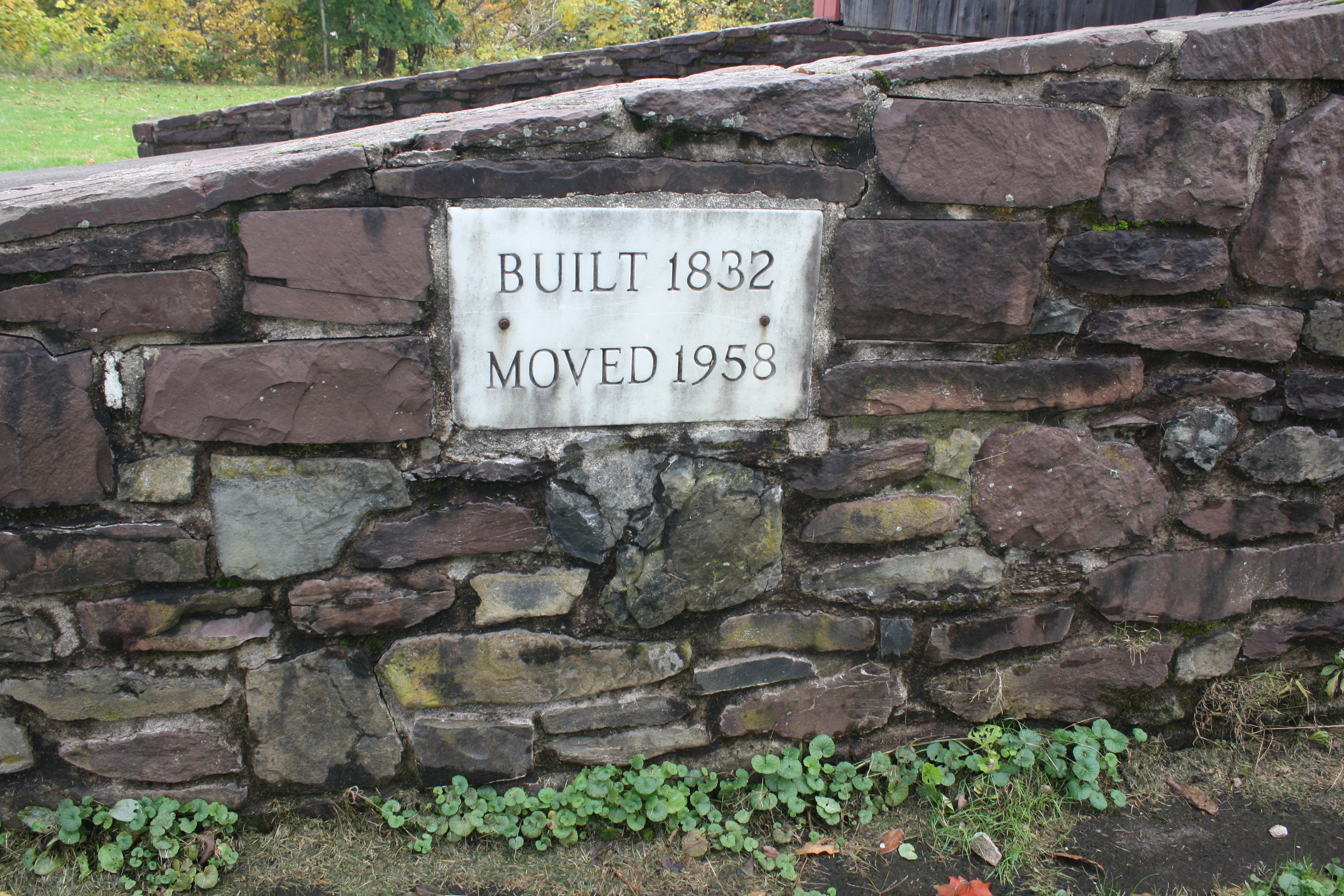
Plaque

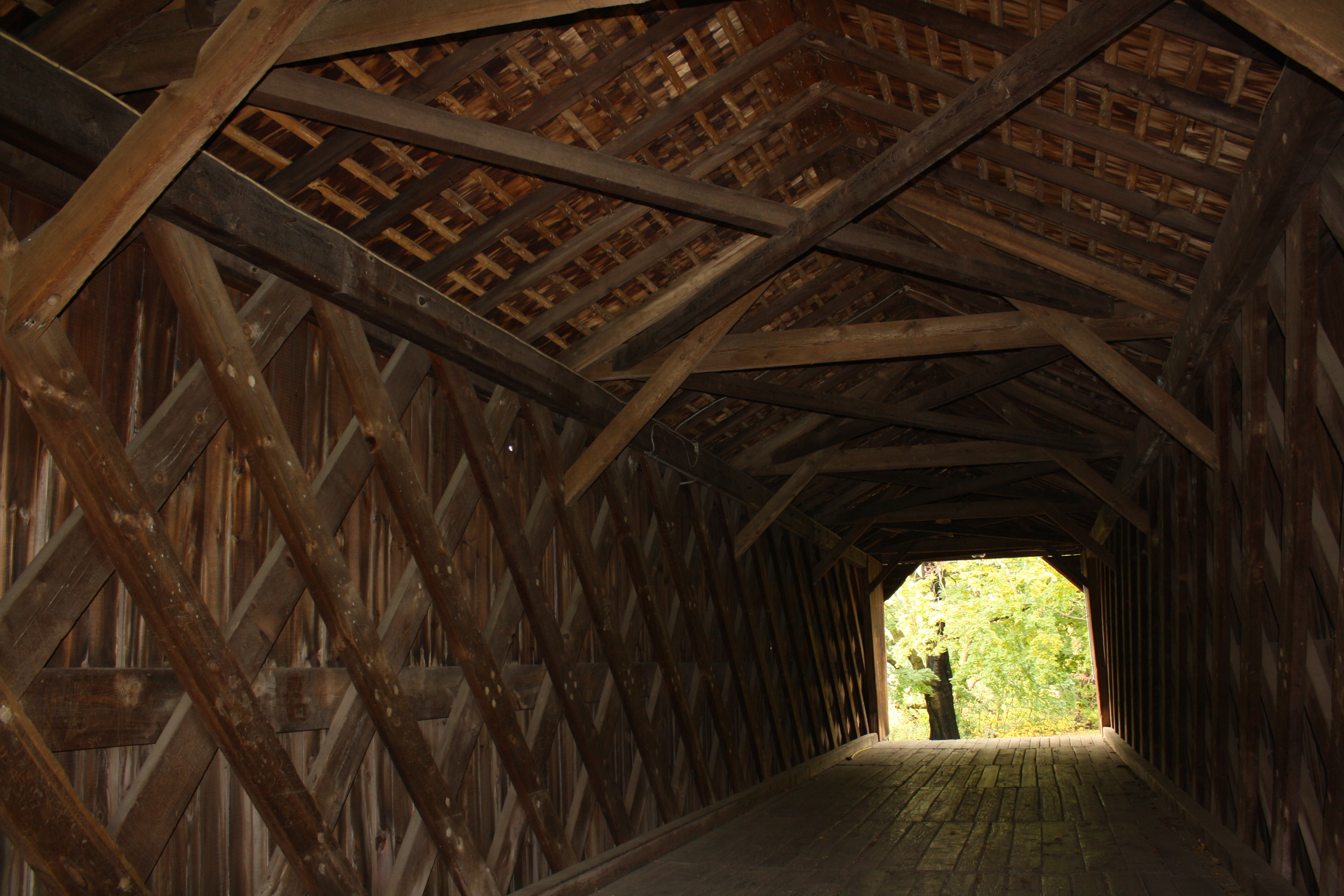
Interior
