= Enoch Roberts House =

Historic house in Pennsylvania, United States

- U.S. National Register of Historic Places
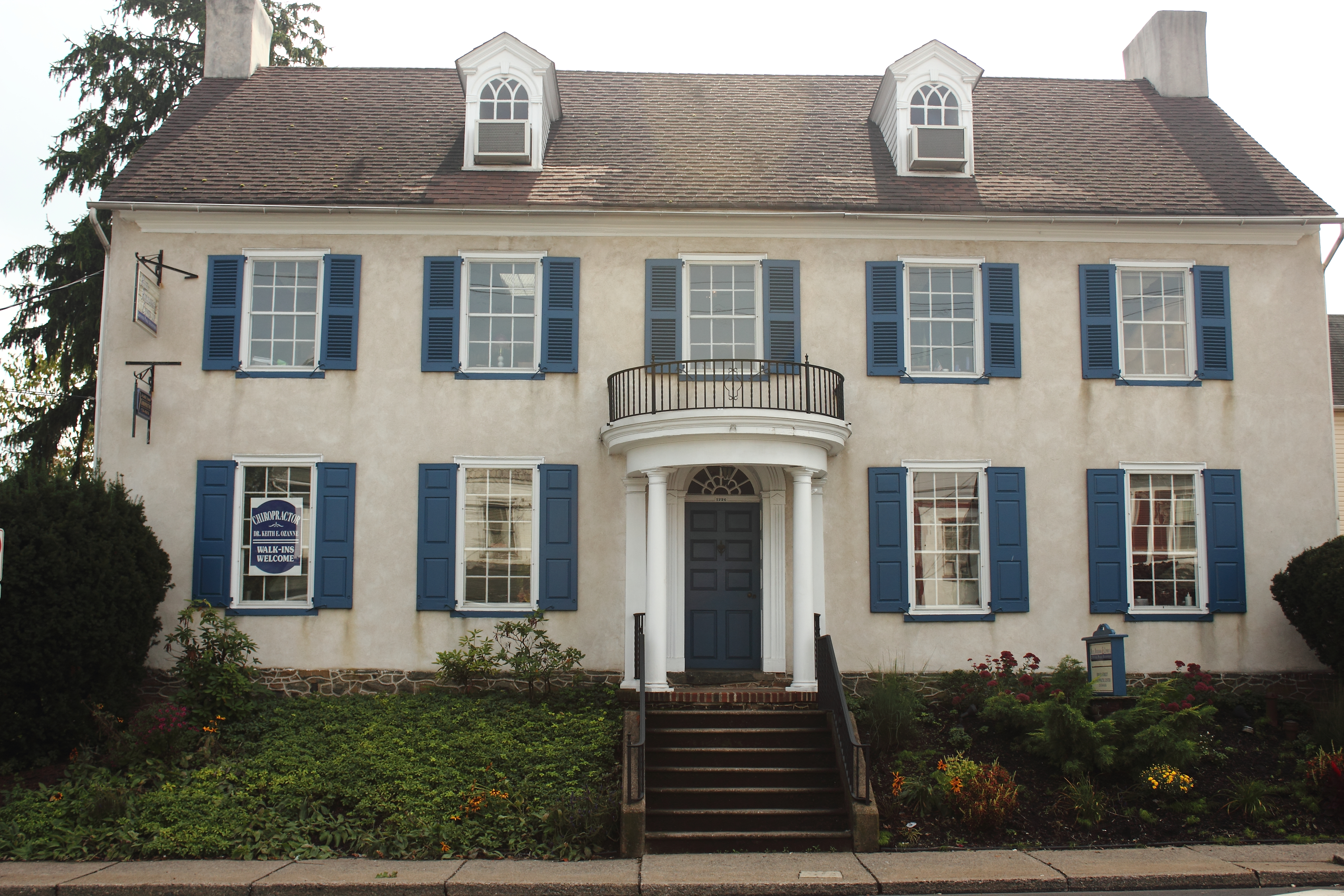
- Enoch Roberts House, September 2012

- Location within Pennsylvania Location within the United States
- Location: 1226 W. Broad St., Quakertown, Pennsylvania
- Coordinates: 40°26′32″N 75°21′7″W
- Area: 0.4 acres (0.16 ha)
- Built: 1814
- Architectural style: Early Republic, Late Georgian
- NRHP reference No.: 86000856
- Added to NRHP: April 24, 1986

Enoch Roberts House, also known as the Trainer Mansion, is a historic home located at Quakertown, Bucks County, Pennsylvania. It was built about 1814, and is a 2 1/2-story, five-bay, plastered fieldstone dwelling in a vernacular Georgian style. It has an original stone rear kitchen ell. It has a gable roof with dormers added in the 1830s and a semi-circular entrance portico added in the 1940s.

It was added to the National Register of Historic Places in 1986.
