= Richard Moore (abolitionist) =

American abolitionist and Underground Railroad stationmaster (1793–1874)

- Born: 1793
- Died: 1874 (aged 80–81)
- Occupation(s): Abolitionist, potter, educator

Richard Moore (1793–1874) was an American potter, educator, and abolitionist who ran a crucial station on the Underground Railroad in Quakertown, Bucks County, Pennsylvania. Over three decades, Moore aided more than 600 freedom seekers, including Christiana Riot participant William Parker, to escape north to freedom.

Moore moved to Quakertown in 1813 and ran a pottery there from 1834 until his death. He also taught large numbers of impoverished children as part of the Richland Friends School. He was a lifelong devout Quaker. He and his wife, Sarah Foulke, used their home as the northernmost Underground Railroad "station" in Bucks County, receiving hundreds of freedom seekers from stations in Chester County or lower Bucks County and dispatching them to Quaker meetings in Stroudsburg or Easton to continue their journey northward. In addition, the Moores hired other fugitives or found them local employment.

In 2019, a Pennsylvania state historical marker was installed at Moore's farmhouse on 421 South Main Street in Quakertown.
