= Diane Bracalente =

American field hockey player

Diana Renee Bracalente (born July 29, 1963, in Quakertown, Pennsylvania) is a former field hockey player from the United States, who finished in eighth position with Team USA in the 1988 Summer Olympics in Seoul.
