= Quakertown, Pennsylvania =

Borough in Pennsylvania, US

- Borough
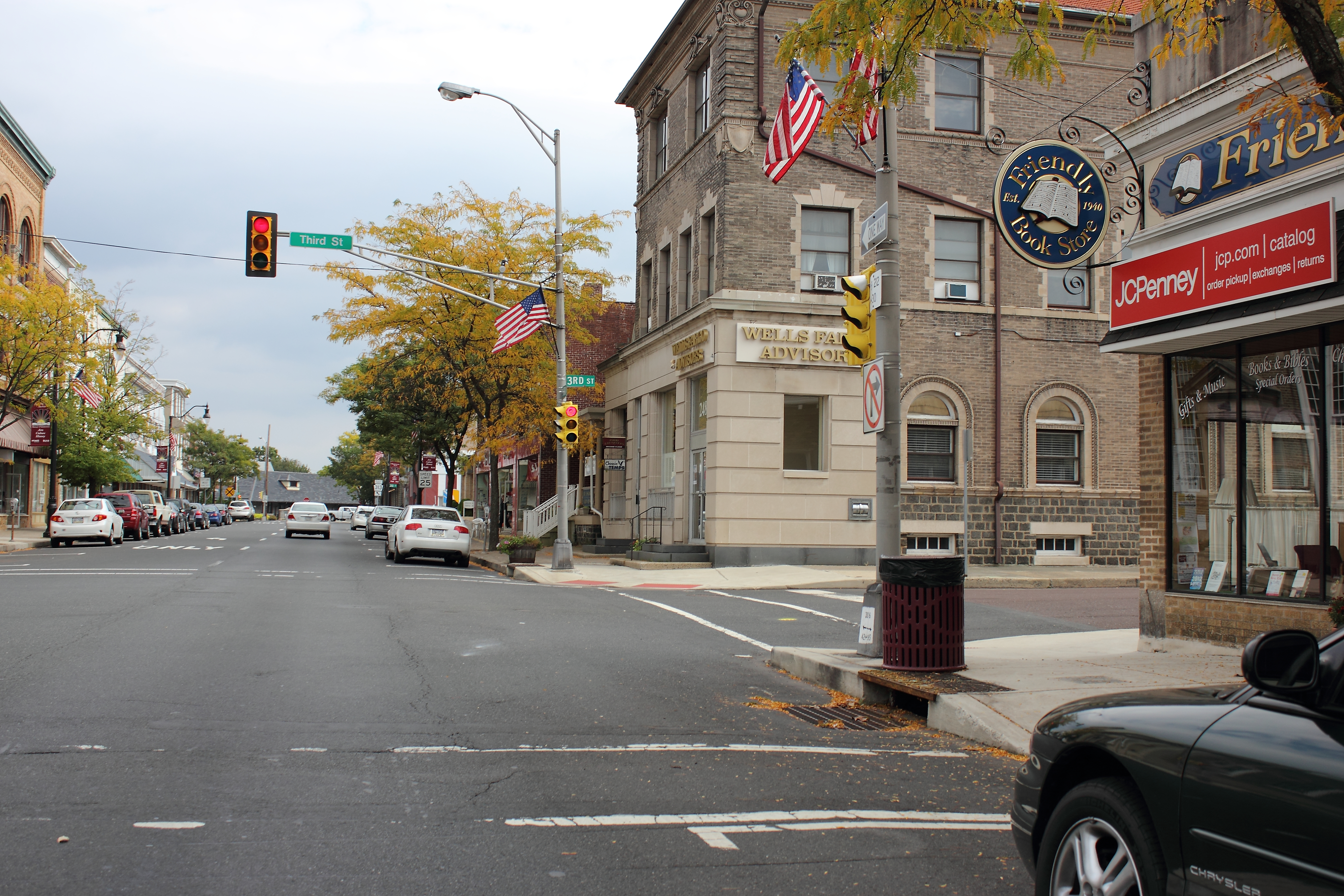
- Broad Street in Quakertown in September 2012

- Seal
- Etymology: the Quakers
- Motto: "The Heart of Upper Bucks County!"
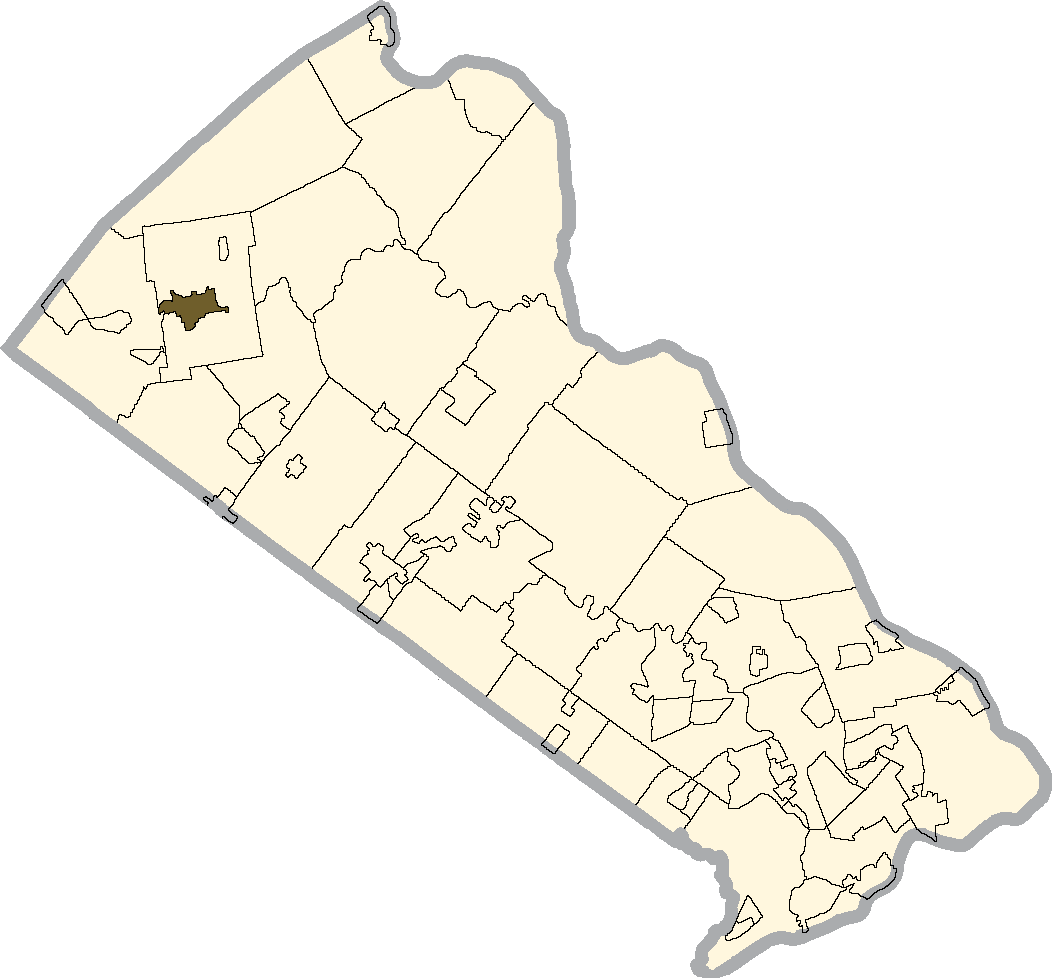
- Location of Quakertown in Bucks County, Pennsylvania

- Location of Quakertown in Pennsylvania Quakertown (the United States)
- Coordinates: 40°26′26″N 75°20′26″W
- Country: United States
- State: Pennsylvania
- County: Bucks

Government
  - Type: Council-manager
  - Council President: Donald E. Rosenberger (R)

Area
  - Total: 2.03 sq mi (5.27 km^{2})
  - Land: 2.03 sq mi (5.27 km^{2})
  - Water: 0 sq mi (0.00 km^{2})
- Elevation: 505 ft (154 m)

Population (2020)
  - Total: 9,359
  - Density: 4,599.5/sq mi (1,775.87/km^{2})
- Time zone: UTC−5 (EST)
  - Summer (DST): UTC−4 (EDT)
- ZIP Code: 18951
- Area codes: 215, 267, 445
- FIPS code: 42-63048
- Website: quakertown.org

Quakertown is a borough in Bucks County, Pennsylvania, United States. As of 2020, it had a population of 9,359. The borough is 13 miles (21 km) south of Allentown and Bethlehem and 35 miles (56 km) north of Philadelphia, making Quakertown a border town of both the Philadelphia metropolitan area and Lehigh Valley.

Quakertown is considered part of the Philadelphia metropolitan area. Richland Township surrounds Quakertown.

== History ==
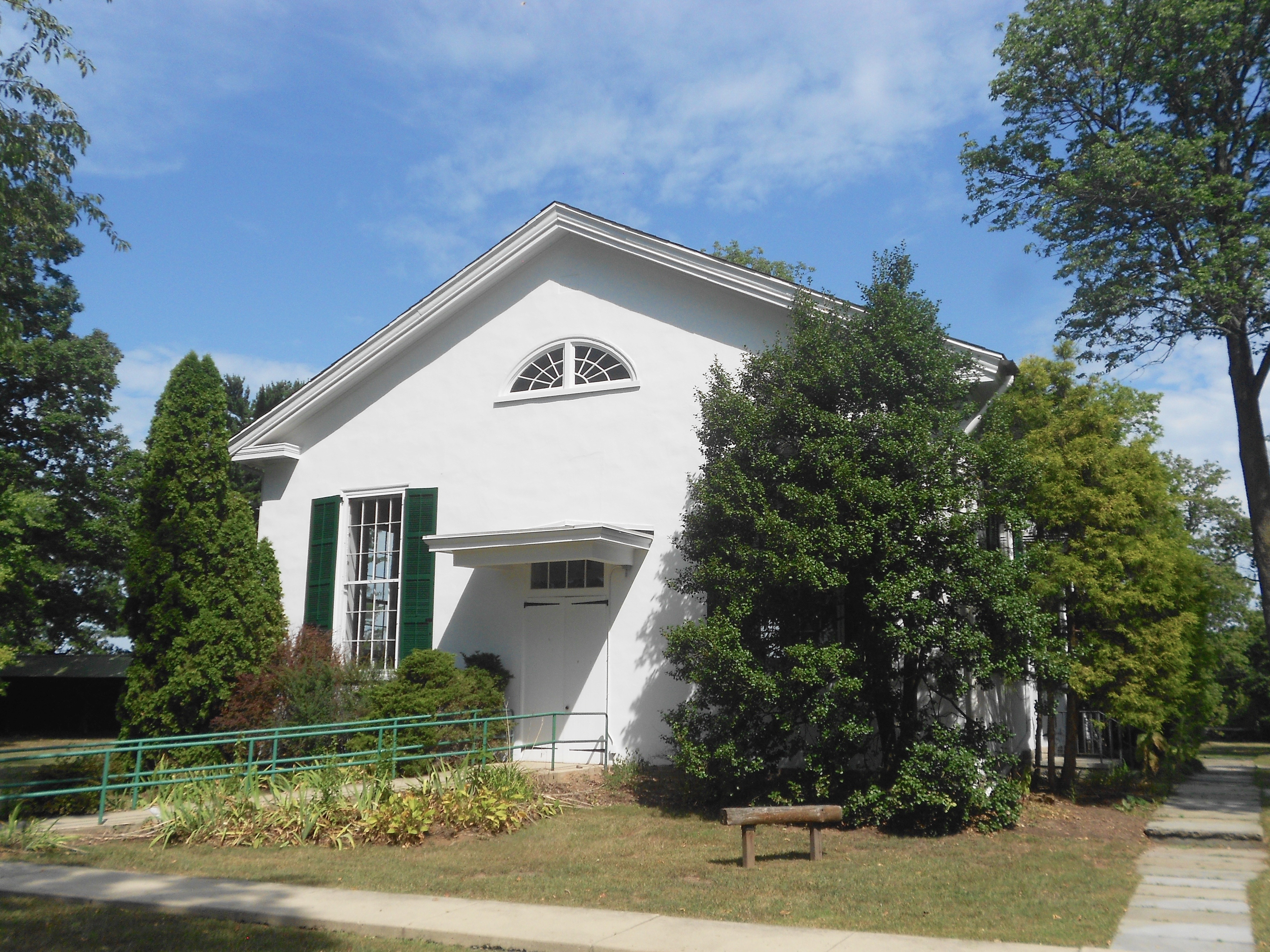
Richland Friends Meeting House, the Quaker meeting house in Quakertown in August 2016

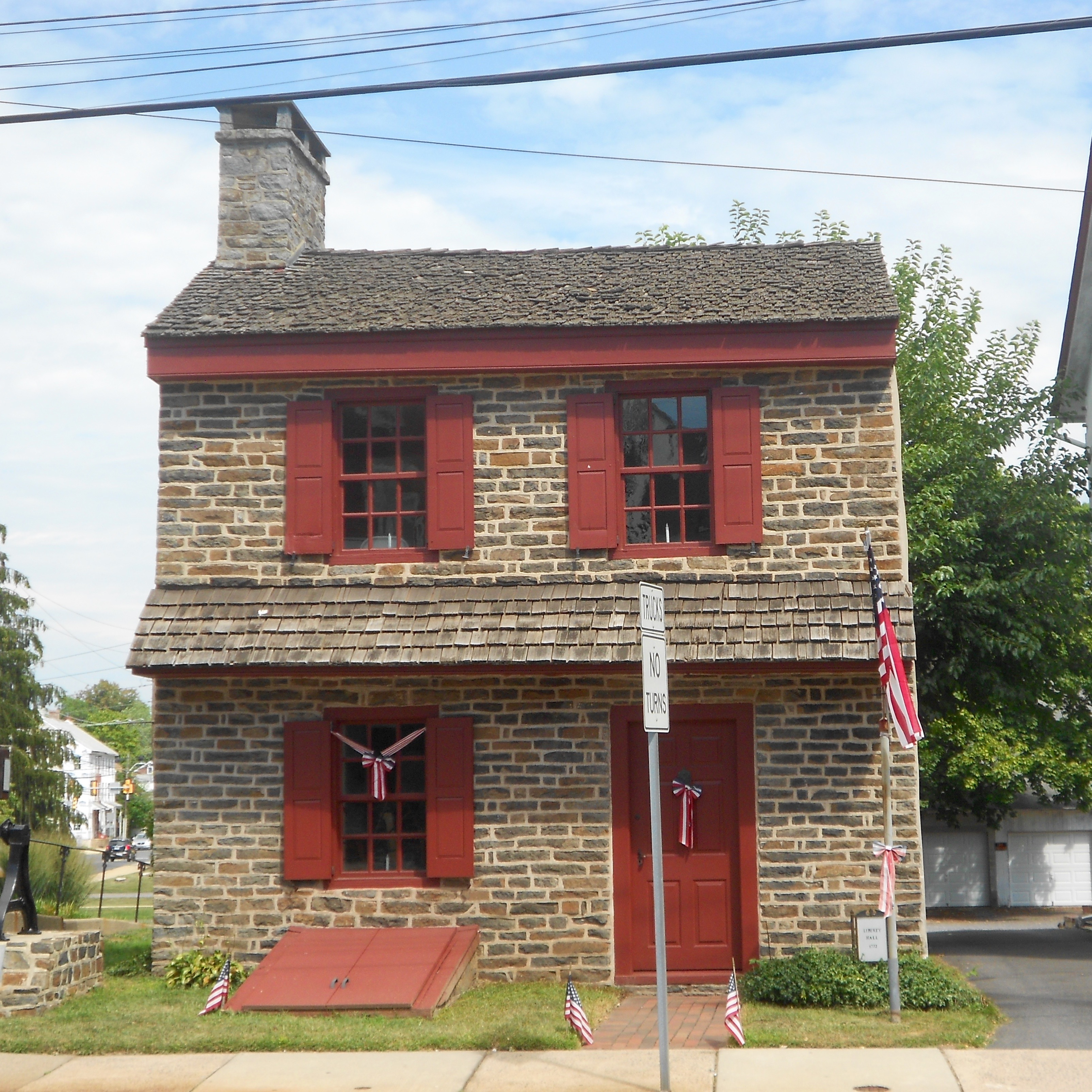
Liberty Hall in Quakertown in August 2016

The region of Quakertown was initially referred to as the Great Swamp, a wilderness inhabited by Native Americans, specifically the Lenape tribe. Quakertown was originally settled by Quakers.

=== 18th century ===
On September 18, 1777, during the American Revolutionary War, a convoy of wagons carrying the Liberty Bell from Philadelphia to Allentown, under the command of Col. Thomas Polk of Charlotte, North Carolina, stopped in Quakertown. The Liberty Bell was stored overnight behind the home of Evan Foulke (1237 West Broad Street), and the entourage stayed at the Red Lion Inn. The John Fries' Rebellion was also started in the Red Lion Inn in 1799.

=== 19th century ===
In 1801 the community became officially known as Quakertown. Just two years later, in 1803, the first post office bearing the name Quakertown opened. During this period, Quakertown functioned as a stopping point for travelers between Philadelphia and Allentown. Although many travelers used Quakertown as a stopover, the town remained a small community of German and Welsh farmers.

In the decades before the Civil War, Quakertown was a hub of the Underground Railroad, with stationmaster Richard Moore aiding over 600 freedom seekers.

The Civil War, along with national economic expansion, changed Quakertown from a tiny village to a commercial manufacturing center. In the 19th century, local industrial establishments included cigar and cigar box factories, silk mills, harness factories, and stove foundries.

In 1854, Quakertown elected its first Burgess. North Pennsylvania Railroad facilitated access to the area, which brought about a great increase in population; by 1880, Quakertown's population reached nearly 1,800.

=== 20th century ===
Quakertown has four historical areas or structures that have been named to the National Register of Historic Places; Liberty Hall, Quakertown Historic District, Quakertown Passenger and Freight Station, and Enoch Roberts House.

Until 1969, Quakertown generated its own electric power.

From 1901 to 1951, Quakertown was an hourly stop on the Lehigh Valley Transit Company's electric interurban trolley line from Allentown and Coopersburg through Quakertown then south through Perkasie, Sellersville, Souderton, Lansdale and Norristown to Philadelphia. With car use limited during World War II due to gasoline rationing, the trolley line moved a very large number of passengers.

Following World War II, however, its business collapsed, and it ceased operation in 1951. The Lehigh Valley Transit station in Quakertown, located at the northwestern corner of Main and Broad streets across from the Red Lion Inn, still stands and its historical significance is marked on the former station's wall. The trolley ran through the center of Main Street on its southbound route to Perkasie.

=== 21st century ===
Quakertown has extensive commercial development along Pennsylvania Route 309, including restaurants, businesses, and retail outlets.

Quakertown's population has grown steadily throughout the 20th and 21st centuries. In 1900, it was 3,014. It rose to 3,801 in 1910. By 1940, the population was 5,150. As of the 2020 census, the population was 9,359.

== Geography ==
According to the U.S. Census Bureau, the borough has a total area of 2.0 square miles (5.2 km^{2}), all land. Licking Run begins in passes through Quakertown from the west to the east and drains into the Tohickon Creek. Tohickon Creek, which drains into the Delaware River, flows past the northeastern edge of the borough.

=== Climate ===
According to the Köppen climate classification system, Quakertown has a Hot-summer, Humid continental climate (Dfa). Dfa climates are characterized by at least one month having an average mean temperature ≤ 32.0 °F (0.0 °C), at least four months with an average mean temperature ≥ 50.0 °F (10.0 °C), at least one month with an average mean temperature ≥ 71.6 °F (22.0 °C) and no significant precipitation difference between seasons. Although most summer days are slightly humid in Quakertown, episodes of heat and high humidity can occur with heat index values > 104 °F (40 °C). Since 1981, the highest air temperature was 101.9 °F (38.8 °C) on July 22, 2011, and the highest daily average mean dew point was 74.4 °F (23.6 °C) on August 1, 2006. The average wettest month is July which corresponds with the annual peak in thunderstorm activity. Since 1981, the wettest calendar day was 6.50 inches (165 mm) on September 30, 2010.

During the winter months, the average annual extreme minimum air temperature is −1.9 °F (−18.8 °C). Since 1981, the coldest air temperature was −13.7 °F (−25.4 °C) on January 22, 1984. Episodes of extreme cold and wind can occur with wind chill values < −13 °F (−25 °C). The average annual snowfall (Nov-Apr) is between 30 inches (76 cm) and 36 inches (91 cm). Ice storms and large snowstorms depositing ≥ 12 inches (30 cm) of snow occur once every few years, particularly during nor’easters from December through February.

Climate data for Quakertown, Elevation 502 ft (153 m), 1991–2020 normals, extremes 1981–2018
Month	Jan	Feb	Mar	Apr	May	Jun	Jul	Aug	Sep	Oct	Nov	Dec	Year
Record high °F (°C)	69.8 (21.0)	77.6 (25.3)	86.3 (30.2)	92.5 (33.6)	93.9 (34.4)	94.9 (34.9)	101.9 (38.8)	98.6 (37.0)	96.2 (35.7)	88.9 (31.6)	79.4 (26.3)	73.9 (23.3)	101.9 (38.8)
Mean daily maximum °F (°C)	37.8 (3.2)	41.0 (5.0)	49.6 (9.8)	61.7 (16.5)	71.8 (22.1)	80.3 (26.8)	84.2 (29.0)	82.6 (28.1)	75.9 (24.4)	64.3 (17.9)	53.1 (11.7)	41.6 (5.3)	62.1 (16.7)
Daily mean °F (°C)	29.1 (−1.6)	31.5 (−0.3)	39.3 (4.1)	50.2 (10.1)	60.0 (15.6)	69.0 (20.6)	73.4 (23.0)	71.8 (22.1)	64.4 (18.0)	53.0 (11.7)	43.1 (6.2)	33.2 (0.7)	51.6 (10.9)
Mean daily minimum °F (°C)	20.4 (−6.4)	22.1 (−5.5)	29.0 (−1.7)	38.7 (3.7)	48.2 (9.0)	57.7 (14.3)	62.6 (17.0)	61.0 (16.1)	53.0 (11.7)	41.6 (5.3)	33.1 (0.6)	24.8 (−4.0)	41.1 (5.1)
Record low °F (°C)	−13.7 (−25.4)	−6.5 (−21.4)	1.8 (−16.8)	16.0 (−8.9)	31.0 (−0.6)	39.4 (4.1)	45.9 (7.7)	40.8 (4.9)	33.4 (0.8)	22.6 (−5.2)	10.0 (−12.2)	−3.0 (−19.4)	−13.7 (−25.4)
Average precipitation inches (mm)	3.50 (89)	2.83 (72)	3.71 (94)	4.08 (104)	4.33 (110)	4.35 (110)	4.80 (122)	3.87 (98)	4.58 (116)	4.35 (110)	3.77 (96)	4.07 (103)	48.24 (1,225)
Average relative humidity (%)	68.7	66.4	61.3	59.9	63.8	70.0	69.9	72.8	73.6	71.4	71.2	71.5	68.4
Average dew point °F (°C)	19.9 (−6.7)	21.6 (−5.8)	27.1 (−2.7)	36.8 (2.7)	47.7 (8.7)	58.8 (14.9)	63.0 (17.2)	62.6 (17.0)	55.8 (13.2)	44.0 (6.7)	34.4 (1.3)	25.0 (−3.9)	41.5 (5.3)
Source: PRISM

=== Ecology ===
According to the A. W. Kuchler U.S. potential natural vegetation types, Quakertown has a dominant vegetation type of Appalachian Oak (104) with a dominant vegetation form of Eastern Hardwood Forest (25). The plant hardiness zone is 6b with an average annual extreme minimum air temperature of −1.9 °F (−18.8 °C). The spring bloom typically begins by April 12 and fall color usually peaks by October 28.

== Demographics ==
Historical population
Census	Pop.	Note	%±
1850	242		—
1860	528		118.2%
1870	863		63.4%
1880	1,769		105.0%
1890	2,169		22.6%
1900	3,014		39.0%
1910	3,801		26.1%
1920	4,391		15.5%
1930	4,883		11.2%
1940	5,150		5.5%
1950	5,673		10.2%
1960	6,305		11.1%
1970	7,276		15.4%
1980	8,867		21.9%
1990	8,982		1.3%
2000	8,931		−0.6%
2010	8,979		0.5%
2020	9,359		4.2%

As of the census of 2020, there were 9,359 people living in the borough. The racial makeup of the borough was 88.3% White, 5.3% African American, 2.0% Asian, 2.7% from other races, 0% Pacific Islander, 0% American Indian or Alaska Native, and 2.9% from two or more races. Hispanic or Latino of any race were 5.4% of the population.

As of 2000 census, there were 8,931 people, 3,421 households, and 2,251 families living in the borough. The population density was 4,424.7 inhabitants per square mile (1,708.4/km^{2}). There were 3,631 housing units at an average density of 1,798.9 per square mile (694.6/km^{2}). The racial makeup of the borough was 94.46% White, 1.20% African American, 0.13% Native American, 1.51% Asian, 0.06% Pacific Islander, 1.58% from other races, and 1.06% from two or more races. Hispanic or Latino of any race were 2.88% of the population.

There were 3,421 households, out of which 32.9% had children under the age of 18 living with them, 50.7% were married couples living together, 10.5% had a female householder with no husband present, and 34.2% were non-families. 28.3% of all households were made up of individuals, and 11.9% had someone living alone who was 65 years of age or older. The average household size was 2.52 and the average family size was 3.11.

In Quakertown, the population was spread out, with 25.5% under the age of 18, 7.9% from 18 to 24, 32.2% from 25 to 44, 19.1% from 45 to 64, and 15.3% who were 65 years of age or older. The median age was 36 years. For every 100 females there were 95.9 males. For every 100 females age 18 and over, there were 92.1 males.

The median income for a household in the borough was $41,942, and the median income for a family was $51,194. Males had a median income of $33,697 versus $26,988 for females. The per capita income for the borough was $20,562. About 3.7% of families and 5.9% of the population were below the poverty line, including 7.0% of those under age 18 and 6.7% of those age 65 or over.

== Government ==
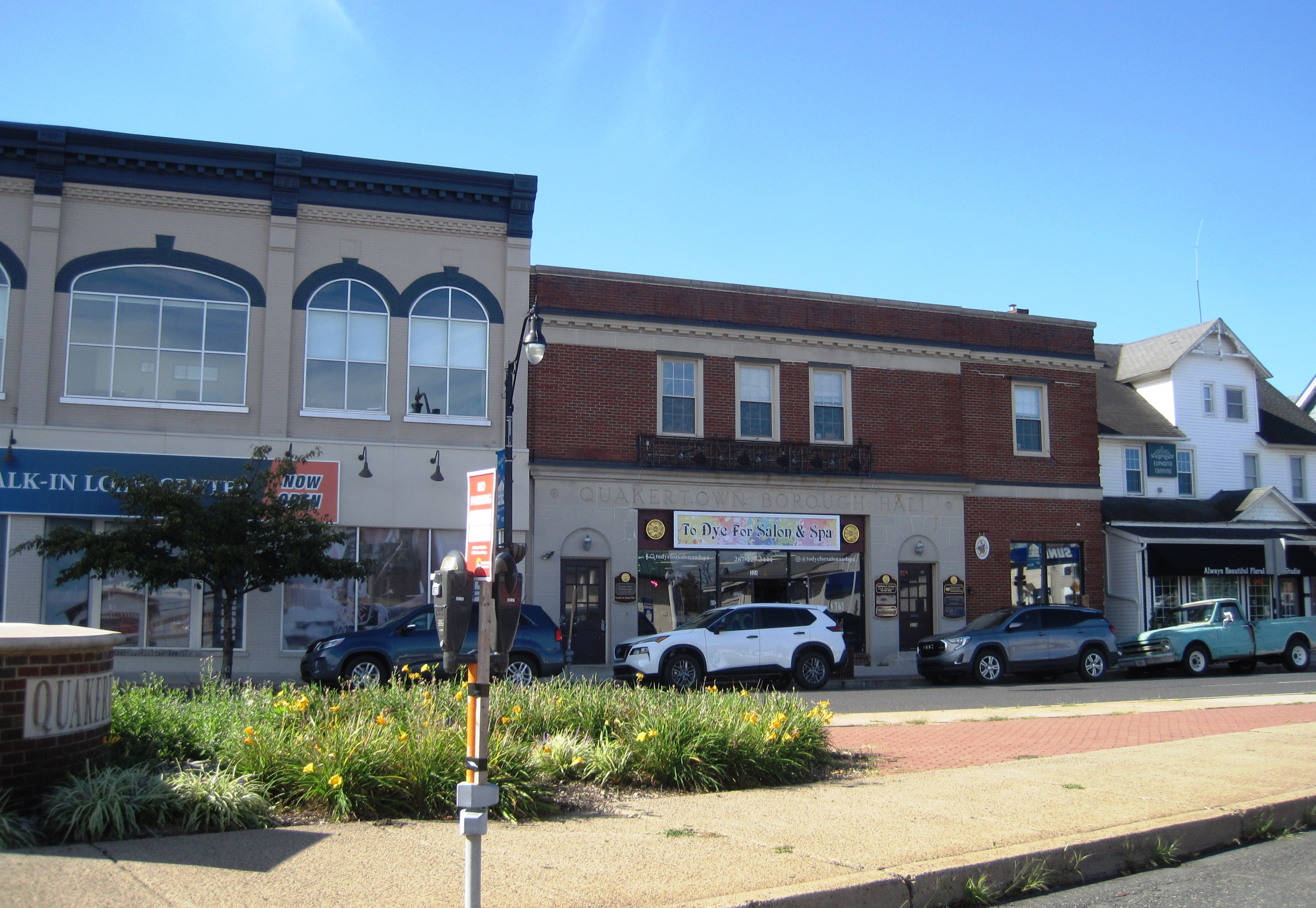
Former municipal building in Quakertown Historic District

Quakertown has a council-manager system of government. The borough has a seven-member Borough Council elected at-large to four-year terms. The council appoints a Borough Manager who manages the daily operations of the borough.

=== Legislators ===
- State Representative: Craig Staats, Republican, Pennsylvania House of Representatives, District 145
- State Senator: Jarrett Coleman, Republican, Pennsylvania Senate, District 16
- US Representative: Brian Fitzpatrick, Republican, Pennsylvania's 1st congressional district

== Transportation ==
=== Roads ===
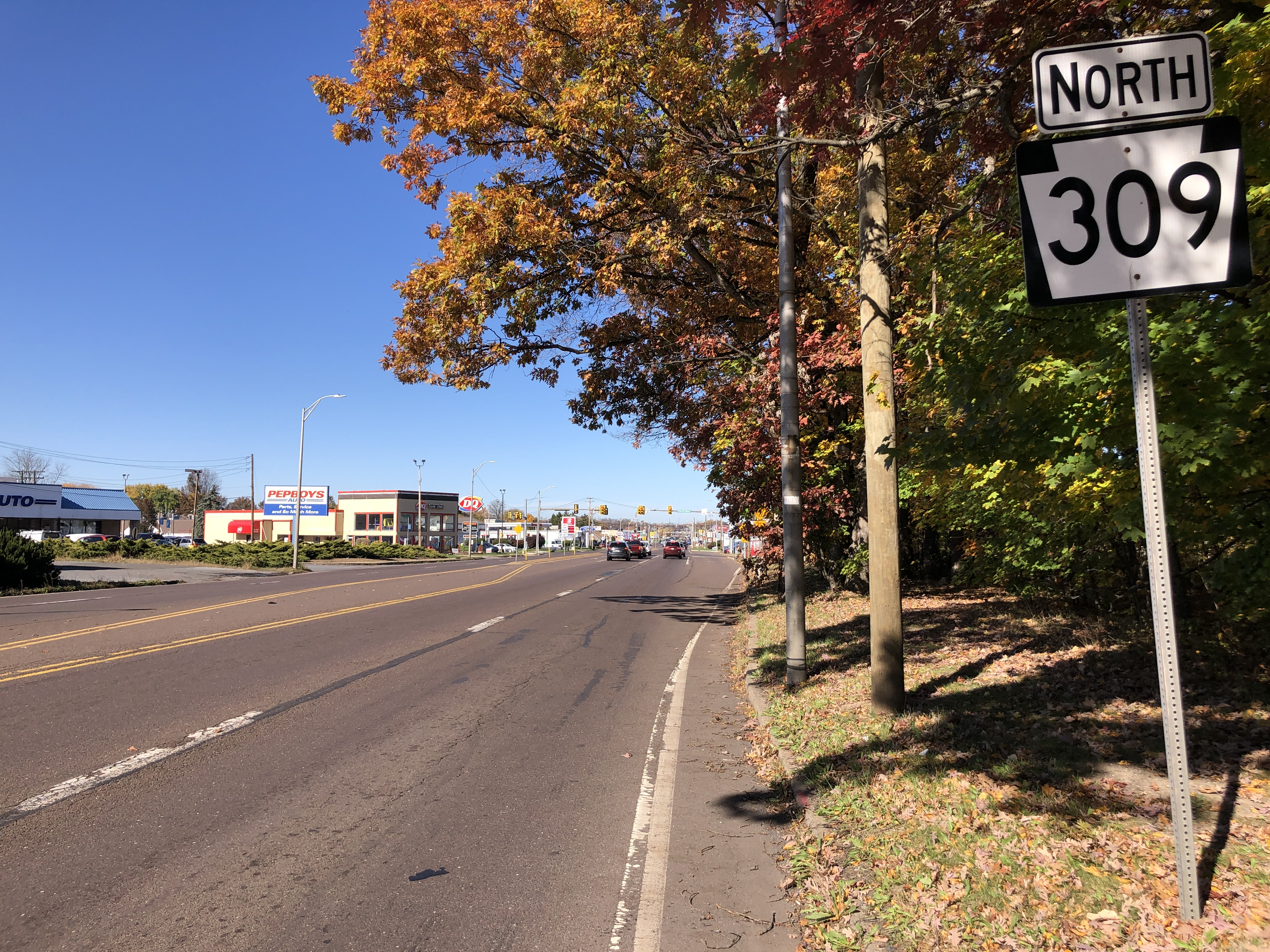
PA 309 northbound in Quakertown

As of 2018, Quakertown had 27.13 miles (43.66 km) of public roads, 5.69 miles (9.16 km) of which were maintained by the Pennsylvania Department of Transportation and 21.44 miles (34.50 km) of which were maintained by the borough.

Quakertown is accessible by four major state highways:

- PA 309 passes through the western part of Quakertown as West End Boulevard and runs north to Allentown and south to Montgomeryville and Philadelphia.
- PA 313 begins at PA 309 in Quakertown and passes through the town on Broad Street, heading southeast to Doylestown.
- PA 663 heads west from Quakertown at the PA 309/PA 313 intersection and interchanges with I-476 (Pennsylvania Turnpike Northeast Extension) at the Quakertown interchange in Milford Township before heading southwest to Pottstown.
- PA 212 heads northeast from PA 313 in Quakertown and provides access to Riegelsville.

=== Bus ===
Quakertown has intercity bus service provided by three carriers:

- Trans-Bridge Lines provides service from a stop on Broad Street in Quakertown to Doylestown to the south and to the Port Authority Bus Terminal in New York City to the north.
- Fullington Trailways provides service from a park and ride lot on PA 663 in Milford Township to Philadelphia, Hazleton, Williamsport, and several other Northeastern Pennsylvania locations.
- Martz Trailways provides service from the park and ride lot on PA 663 to Scranton, Wilkes-Barre, White Haven, Allentown, and Philadelphia. This is an Amtrak Thruway route, connecting to Amtrak trains at 30th Street Station in Philadelphia.

=== Train ===
Quakertown had passenger rail service from the Quakertown station along the Bethlehem Line to Bethlehem and Philadelphia until it was discontinued in July 1981 by SEPTA, which ended service on all its intercity diesel-powered lines. Due to the numerous industrial complexes in Quakertown, the borough currently has freight rail service provided by a branch of the East Penn Railroad along the former SEPTA tracks.

=== Air ===
Quakertown Airport, a public general aviation airport, is located just outside Quakertown, in Milford Township.

== Utilities ==
Quakertown provides various utility services to businesses and residents. The Borough of Quakertown Electric Department provides electricity to the borough. The borough has operated its own electric department since the early 1890s and generated its own electricity until 1969, with electricity now purchased wholesale. The Borough of Quakertown Water Department provides water to the borough, operating ten wells and three storage facilities. The Borough of Quakertown Sewer Department provides sewer service to the borough, operating a wastewater treatment plant.

Natural gas service in Quakertown is provided by UGI Utilities. The Borough of Quakertown Sanitation Department provides trash and recycling collection.

== Health care ==
St. Luke's University Health Network operates St. Luke's Upper Bucks Campus hospital outside the borough in Milford Township, serving the northern portion of Bucks County. The hospital was opened as Quakertown Community Hospital, located within the borough of Quakertown, on June 5, 1930, and was acquired by St. Luke's University Health Network in August 1995. St. Luke's Quakertown Campus was replaced by St. Luke's Upper Bucks Campus on December 14, 2019.

St. Luke's Upper Bucks Campus offers an emergency room and various inpatient and outpatient services including women's health services, surgical services, heart and vascular services, radiology services, and wound care. Grand View Health and Lehigh Valley Health Network jointly operate the Health Center at Quakertown, which offers various outpatient services such as laboratory services, X-rays, and cardiac testing along with physician offices focusing on cardiology, orthopedics, primary care, specialty care, and pediatrics.

== Police and fire ==
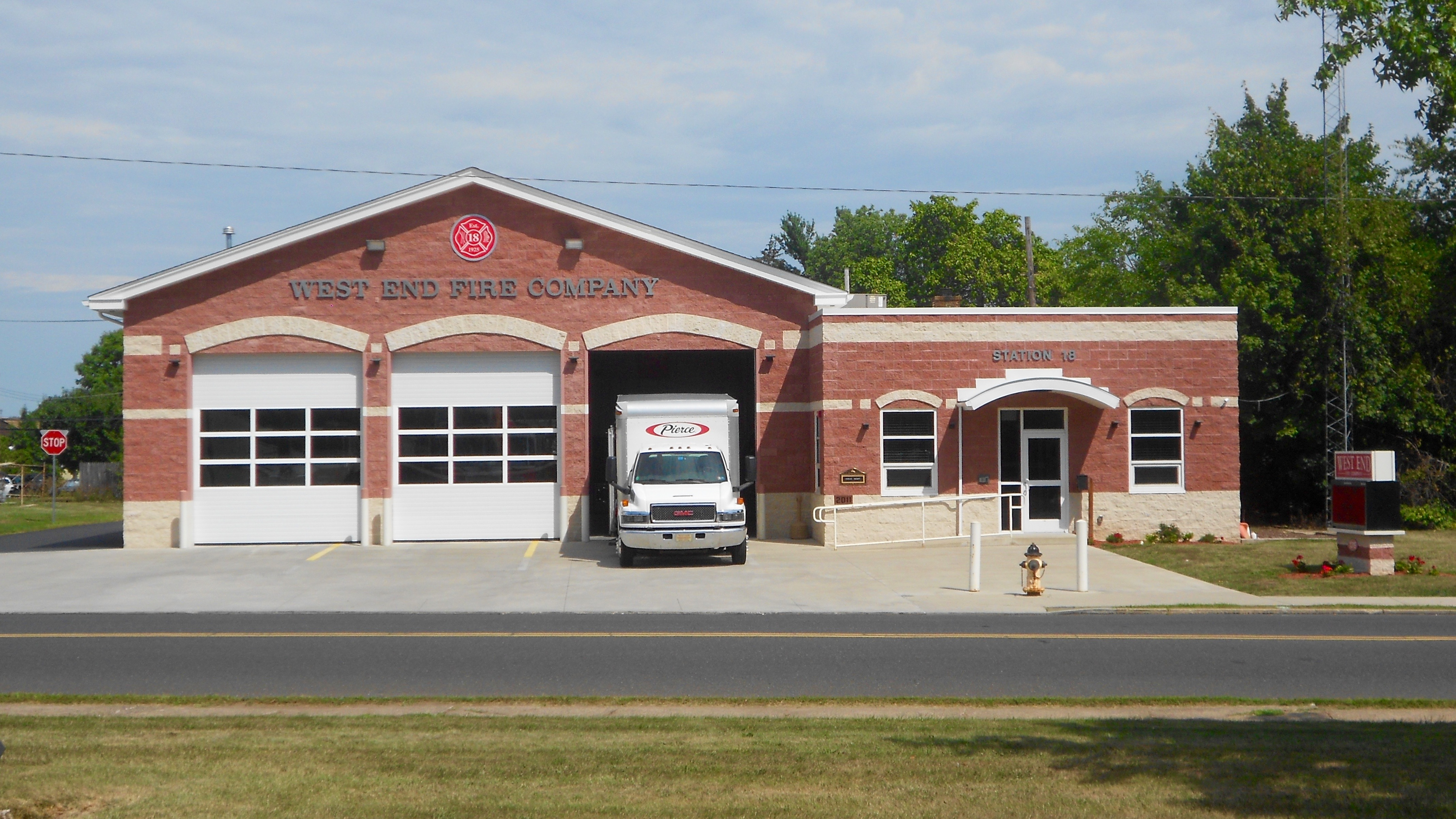
West End Fire Company in Quakertown in August 2016

Police services in the borough are provided 24 hours a day, 7 days a week by the Quakertown Borough Police Department, which consists of a Chief, Detective Lieutenant, Administrative Sergeant, two Patrol Sergeants, two Detectives, twelve Patrol Officers, and three support staff.

Fire protection in Quakertown and surrounding areas is provided by the Quakertown Fire Department, a volunteer fire department which operates the Quakertown Fire Company #1-Station 17 on West Broad Street and the West End Fire Company-Station 18 on Park Avenue.

== Education ==
Quakertown Community School District serves public school students in the borough. Quakertown Elementary School, a historic school, and Neidig Elementary School, both located within borough limits, serve students in grades K-5 based on where they live. The Sixth Grade Center serves borough students in sixth grade, Strayer Middle School serves grades 7-8, and Quakertown Community High School serves grades 9-12.

The Archdiocese of Philadelphia operates St. Isidore school, located in Quakertown, for many parochial school students. The borough is also home to the United Friends School.

== Notable people ==
- Megan Angelo, journalist and author
- Karen Bliss, former cyclist
- Tom Bossert, lawyer and former Homeland Security Advisor to U.S. President Donald Trump
- Diane Bracalente, 1988 Summer Olympic field hockey player
- Sabrina Carpenter, two-time Grammy-winning singer and actress
- Katlyn Chookagian, UFC fighter
- Reuben Swinburne Clymer, occultist and modern Rosicrucian Supreme Grand Master of Fraternitas Rosae Crucis
- Jill Davis, former professional tennis player
- Charles Fechter, Anglo-French actor
- Oliver W. Frey, Democratic member of the U.S. House of Representatives from Pennsylvania
- Ray Hartranft, professional baseball player, Philadelphia Phillies
- John Robert Kline, mathematician and educator
- Tim Lewis, former professional football player for the Green Bay Packers
- Will Lewis, football executive and former professional player, including the Seattle Seahawks and Kansas City Chiefs
- Bill Mensch, microcomputer pioneer
- Richard Moore, abolitionist
- George Papashvily, writer and sculptor
- Frances Quinlan, singer-songwriter, guitarist and visual artist best known for fronting Philadelphia indie rock band Hop Along
- Rebecca Quinn, professional racing cyclist
- Louis Riddick, former professional football player for the San Francisco 49ers and Monday Night Football analyst
- Robb Riddick, former professional football player for the Buffalo Bills
- Jeff Rodenberger, former professional football player for the Philadelphia/Baltimore Stars and New Orleans Saints
- Priscilla Kepner Sage, textile and fiber artist
- Ken Schroy, former professional football player for the New York Jets
- Jan Shepard, film and television actress
- Clyde Smoll, professional baseball player, Philadelphia Phillies
- Meredith Stern, artist, musician, and disc jockey
- Walter L. Stewart Jr., US Army major general, lived in Quakertown
- Hampton S. Thomas, Medal of Honor recipient in the American Civil War
- Addison Timlin, actress
- Neil Vipond, actor
