= Pennridge Airport =

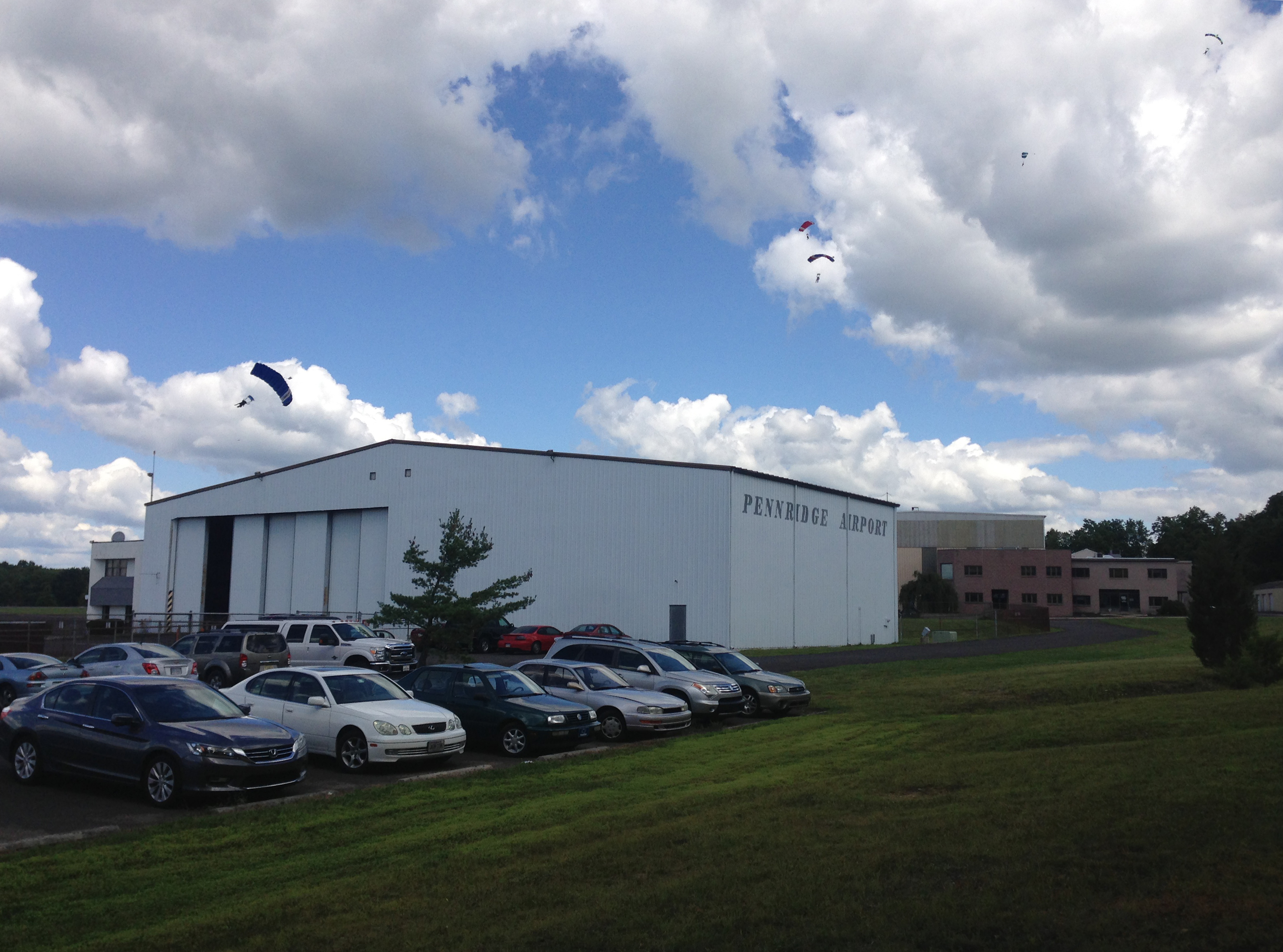
- IATA: none; ICAO: KCKZ; FAA LID: CKZ

Summary
- Airport type: Public
- Owner: Pennridge Development Ent. Inc.
- Serves: Perkasie, Pennsylvania, U.S.
- Location: East Rockhill Township, Pennsylvania, U.S.
- Elevation AMSL: 568 ft / 173 m
- Coordinates: 40°23′21″N 075°17′26″W

Map
- Location of airport in Pennsylvania CKZ (the United States)

Runways
Direction	Length		Surface
Direction	ft	m	Surface
8/26	4,215	1,285	Asphalt

Statistics (2008)
- Aircraft operations: 29,635
- Based aircraft: 42
- Source: Federal Aviation Administration

Pennridge Airport (ICAO: KCKZ, FAA LID: CKZ, formerly N70) is a public-use airport located one nautical mile (1.85 km) north of the central business district of Perkasie in East Rockhill Township, Pennsylvania, United States. It is privately owned by Pennridge Development Ent., Inc.

The airport is located on top of a ridge and is surrounded on every side by trees. Although the daily operations are under 100 takeoffs and landings, it is the largest privately owned airport north of Philadelphia and south of Allentown.

Although most U.S. airports use the same three-letter location identifier for the FAA and IATA, Pennridge Airport is assigned CKZ by the FAA but has no designation from the IATA, which assigned CKZ to Çanakkale Airport in Çanakkale, Turkey.

== History ==
=== 20th century ===
The airport was founded in Perkasie in 1966. Preparations began on June 7, 1965, when William Hart Rufe III and Joseph A. Gloster formed the corporation Pennridge Development Enterprises (PDE, Inc.), which is still the owner of the airport.

Gloster was a quarry owner and heavy equipment operator who laid out the runway, hauled the stone, and did the grading for the runway. Rufe, a lawyer, did the land acquisition, mortgage financing, and contracting for the paving of the runway and construction of the first hangar and terminal building, and handled the paperwork to get the airport licensed. The property, about 234 acres, later expanded by acquisitions to its current 260, was transferred to PDE, Inc.

A contractor finished paving the original landing strip in December 1965. On April 1, 1966, the airport was inspected by Fred Osmond, Chief Inspector of the Pennsylvania Aeronautic Commission, who announced that he would approve the application for a license despite the objections of a group of neighbors who opposed the airport. Three days later the license was received and Pennridge Airport officially opened.

The business plan was to develop a corporate complex catering to airplane-using companies around the airport. PDE, Inc., initially sold one factory site to a company that built a hangar and used their own plane for corporate purposes.

The first fixed-base operator (FBO) was Hortman Aviation, Inc., owned by Norm Hortman, a senior TWA pilot, and his brother Bob Hortman. Norm Hortman had a Piper Cub sales distributorship. He operated Pennridge Airport remotely from his primary base at the Morrisville Airport until April 1968.

The next FBO was Bryant Aviation, Inc. Jack and Marge Bryant signed a five-year lease (later renewed and extended to ten years) and started operation on April 1, 1968. They operated the airport, sold airplanes, gave flying lessons, flew charter flights, sold airplane fuel, rented planes, and operated the 36' x 24' terminal building. They also hired an airplane mechanic to service planes.

In 1970, Rufe bought out Gloster's share of the stock and became the sole owner of the airport. Later the FBO fell in arrears on the rental and Rufe was in danger of losing the airport. He was approached by a real estate developer who wanted to buy and develop housing on the property. Neighboring property owners fought against the zoning change for real estate development, claiming the airport was a huge benefit to the community. By 1981, Rufe had done considerable development planning and was nearing approval for all the zoning when he was approached by Andy Deutsch (Gustavo Andrés Deutsch), who lived on a farm a few miles away and flew his own jet airplane.

In August 1981, Rufe sold the corporation to Flight Levels Corp (FLC). FLC invested money into the airport, including widening the runway from 50 to 100 feet and lengthening it from the original 4000 feet to 4600 feet. The original terminal building was torn down and replaced by a larger terminal with a hangar suitable for jet aircraft. A taxiway was constructed for the full length of the runway, and a complete navigation system installed on the airport. The corporation was sold to a Swiss company which began to follow the original plan, i.e., developing the airport as a corporate complex catering to those companies that utilize jet travel in their operations.

For a brief period in the late 1980s, a landing fee of $5-6 was charged to pilots.

=== 21st century ===
On November 1, 2008, John McCain made a stop at Pennridge Airport during his 2008 campaign. About 6,000 people attended the rally.

There are now two corporate jets and one corporate single engine turbine aircraft based at the airport, in addition to skydiving aircraft.

In 2018, Pennridge Development Enterprises, Inc., announced plans for a business park adjacent to the airport, including two new hangar buildings at the airport site in Perkasie, and later six more industrial manufacturing buildings on airport property located in Pekasie Borough and East Rockhill Township.

== Facilities and aircraft ==
Pennridge Airport covers an area of 270 acres (110 ha) at an elevation of 568 feet (173 m) above mean sea level. It has one runway designated 8/26 with an asphalt surface measuring 4,215 by 100 feet (1,285 x 30 m).

For the 12-month period ending November 25, 2008, the airport had 29,635 aircraft operations, an average of 81 per day: 99% general aviation and 1% military. At that time there were 42 aircraft based at this airport: 86% single-engine, 12% multi-engine and 2% jet.

== See also ==
- List of airports in Pennsylvania
