= Perkasie, Pennsylvania =

Borough in Pennsylvania, US

Perkasie, Pennsylvania Pokesing
- Borough
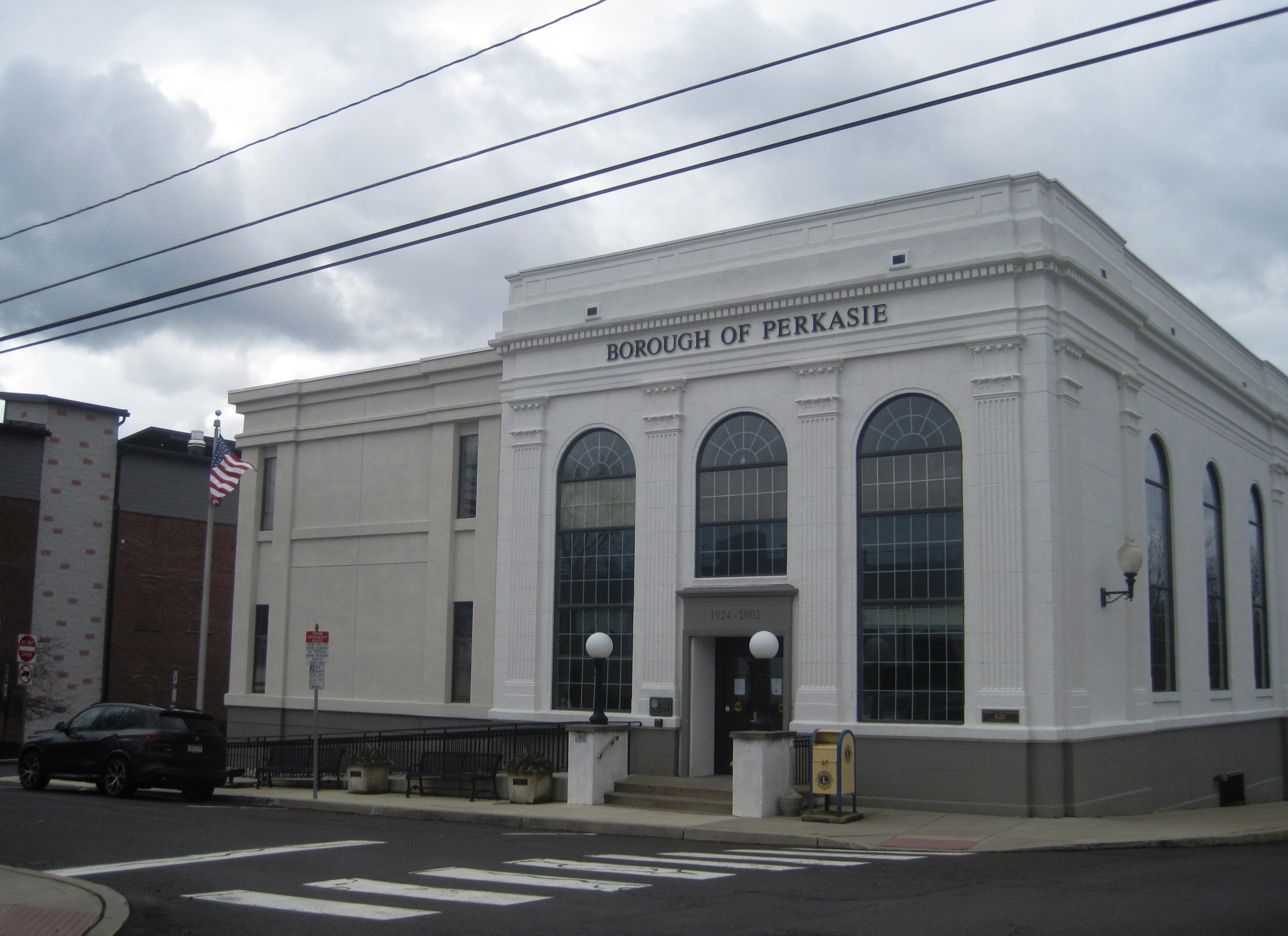
- Perkasie Borough Hall

- Seal

- Location of Perkasie in Bucks County, Pennsylvania

- Location in Pennsylvania Location in the United States
- Coordinates: 40°22′18″N 75°17′35″W
- Country: United States
- State: Pennsylvania
- County: Bucks

Government
  - Mayor: John Hollenbach

Area
  - Total: 2.56 sq mi (6.64 km^{2})
  - Land: 2.54 sq mi (6.57 km^{2})
  - Water: 0.027 sq mi (0.07 km^{2})
- Elevation: 436 ft (133 m)

Population (2020)
  - Total: 9,120
  - Density: 3,597.2/sq mi (1,388.88/km^{2})
- Time zone: UTC-5 (Eastern (EST))
  - Summer (DST): UTC-4 (EDT)
- ZIP Codes: 18944, 18960
- Area codes: 215, 267 and 445
- FIPS code: 42-59384
- Website: www.perkasieborough.org

Perkasie is a borough in Bucks County, Pennsylvania, United States. Perkasie is 21.5 miles (34.6 km) southeast of Allentown and 39.2 miles (63.1 km) north of Philadelphia.

Establishments in the borough early in the 20th century included silk mills, brickyards, lumber mills, tile works, a stone crusher, and manufacturers of cigars, tags and labels, and wire novelties. The population in 1900 was 1,803; in 1910, 2,779 people lived in Perkasie. The population was 9,120 at the 2020 census, up from 8,511 at the 2010 census.

== History ==
=== Perkasie etymology and town formation ===
Both the town of Perkasie and Pocasie Creek derive their name from the Lenape Unami phrase Pèhpahkàsink/Poekskossing, which translates to "One who goes to the place to crack nuts". The Dutch/Swedish (before the British settlements) pronounced the word with an r and it stuck. There was doubtless a village on the site of the present town before William Penn’s Perkasie Manor was settled." "The "Manor" of Perkasie was one of several in Bucks County and contained 11,462 acres (4,639 ha). Laid out and surveyed in 1708, it embraced most of Hilltown and Rockhill Township."

=== 1890 fire ===
On June 8, 1890, a disastrous fire began at the livery stable located at 7th and Chestnut Streets; twelve buildings were destroyed. Personal buckets and ladders were used to extinguish the fire. Less than a month later, on July 4, 1890, a committee appointed by Perkasie Borough Council met to form the Hope Fire Company. On September 8, 1890, the Hope Fire Company met at Groover's Hall (517 Chestnut Street) and adopted a constitution and by-laws; 32 members were present. At the same time, borough council turned over to the fire company a hand pumper purchased from Newtown Fire Association, and a hose cart purchased from Philadelphia with 800 feet (240 m) of hose. One month later, the Philadelphia & Reading Railroad presented the Fire Company with a tire for a steam locomotive driver wheel for use as a fire alarm. This was installed in a cupola of the Groover building (now in front of Silverdale Fire Company).

=== Industry ===
Between 1920 and 1950, a factory at 815 Chestnut Street produced millions of hand stitched major-league baseballs through a Hubbert/Spalding contract. The building was subsequently converted into the Senior Citizens Center, which has since moved to the neighboring borough of Silverdale. It is now scheduled to be converted to six two-bedroom condominiums by Habitat for Humanity of Bucks County to provide a new start for families in need. The organization plans to utilize green building techniques while preserving the building's historical exterior.

=== 1988 fire and recovery ===
On June 26, 1988, about 15 percent of the town, including many historic buildings, were burned down in what became known as The Great Perkasie Fire. This massive fire was started by two 12-year-old boys who were playing with a lighter near the coal bins behind the Shelley & Sons lumberyard at Seventh and Market Streets. The fire was fought by about 300 firefighters who came from over 50 fire companies in three counties. Among the historic buildings lost were the American House and the Moyer-Kantner Funeral Home, both dating from 1870; the Herstine Building; and the J.G. Moyer building. The latter was photographed for the cover of the July 7, 1945, edition of The Saturday Evening Post, an artistic rendition of a Fourth of July parade by John Falter. Despite the size of the fire, no fatalities were reported. Immediately after the fire, a group of concerned business owners, residents and borough officials formed a Downtown Restoration Task Force. The Task Force was given the name of the Perkasie Olde Towne Association. This group was the forerunner to the Perkasie Towne Improvement Association (PTIA). The PTIA along with Perkasie's local government were responsible for the three-phase town improvement plan that was completed over the next five intervening years. The PTIA's focus was to oversee the reconstruction of not only the area of the town center affected by the fire, but also other retail and residential areas in the central part of the borough. As a result of these efforts, streetscape enhancements of decorative street lights, underground utilities, new sidewalks with decorative brick borders were built and new benches, trash receptacles and street trees were placed throughout the focus area.

=== Historical sites ===
The South Perkasie Covered Bridge was listed on the National Register of Historic Places in 1980. The Pearl S. Buck House at Green Hills Farm, which is on the National Register of Historic Places, is located near Perkasie in Hilltown Twp.

=== Interurban trolley to Philadelphia ===
From 1901 to 1951, Perkasie was an important stop on the hourly running Lehigh Valley Transit Company's electric interurban trolley line from Allentown through Quakertown to Perkasie, then south to Sellersville, Souderton, Lansdale, Norristown, and Philadelphia. During World War II, as the result of gasoline rationing with auto use restricted, it transported a very large number of passengers. After the war, the railway's business collapsed, and it ceased service in 1951. The LVT former station sits on 4th Street, just south of the LVT tunnel (with a trolley mural on one wall) which passed under the former Reading Railroad's line to Bethlehem.

== Demographics ==
Historical population
Census	Pop.	Note	%±
1880	300		—
1890	458		52.7%
1900	1,803		293.7%
1910	2,779		54.1%
1920	3,150		13.4%
1930	3,403		8.0%
1940	4,121		21.1%
1950	4,358		5.8%
1960	4,650		6.7%
1970	5,451		17.2%
1980	5,241		−3.9%
1990	7,878		50.3%
2000	8,828		12.1%
2010	8,511		−3.6%
2020	9,120		7.2%

As of the census of 2010, there were 8,511 people living in the borough. The racial makeup of the borough was 93.9% White, 1.0% African American, 0.2% Native American, 1.0% Asian, 0.0% Pacific Islander, 0.5% from other races, and 1.4% from two or more races. Hispanic or Latino of any race were 2.5% of the population.

As of the census of 2000, there were 8,828 people, 3,294 households, and 2,338 families living in the borough. The population density was 3,408.9 inhabitants per square mile (1,316.2/km^{2}). There were 3,378 housing units at an average density of 1,304.4 per square mile (503.6/km^{2}). The racial makeup of the borough was 97.77% White, 0.59% African American, 0.16% Native American, 0.53% Asian, 0.36% from other races, and 0.59% from two or more races. Hispanic or Latino of any race were 1.36% of the population.

There were 3,294 households, out of which 40.2% had children under the age of 18 living with them, 60.0% were married couples living together, 8.0% had a female householder with no husband present, and 29.0% were non-families. 24.5% of all households were made up of individuals, and 9.4% had someone living alone who was 65 years of age or older. The average household size was 2.68 and the average family size was 3.25.

In the borough the population was spread out, with 29.6% under the age of 18, 6.5% from 18 to 24, 34.3% from 25 to 44, 19.0% from 45 to 64, and 10.6% who were 65 years of age or older. The median age was 35 years. For every 100 females there were 98.7 males. For every 100 females age 18 and over, there were 95.4 males.

The median income for a household in the borough was $52,000, and the median income for a family was $59,413. Males had a median income of $42,388 versus $28,323 for females. The per capita income for the borough was $21,986. 4.7% of the population and 4.2% of families were below the poverty line. Out of the total population, 3.3% of those under the age of 18 and 7.9% of those 65 and older were living below the poverty line.

Perkasie is served by the Pennridge School District.

== Infrastructure ==
=== Transportation ===
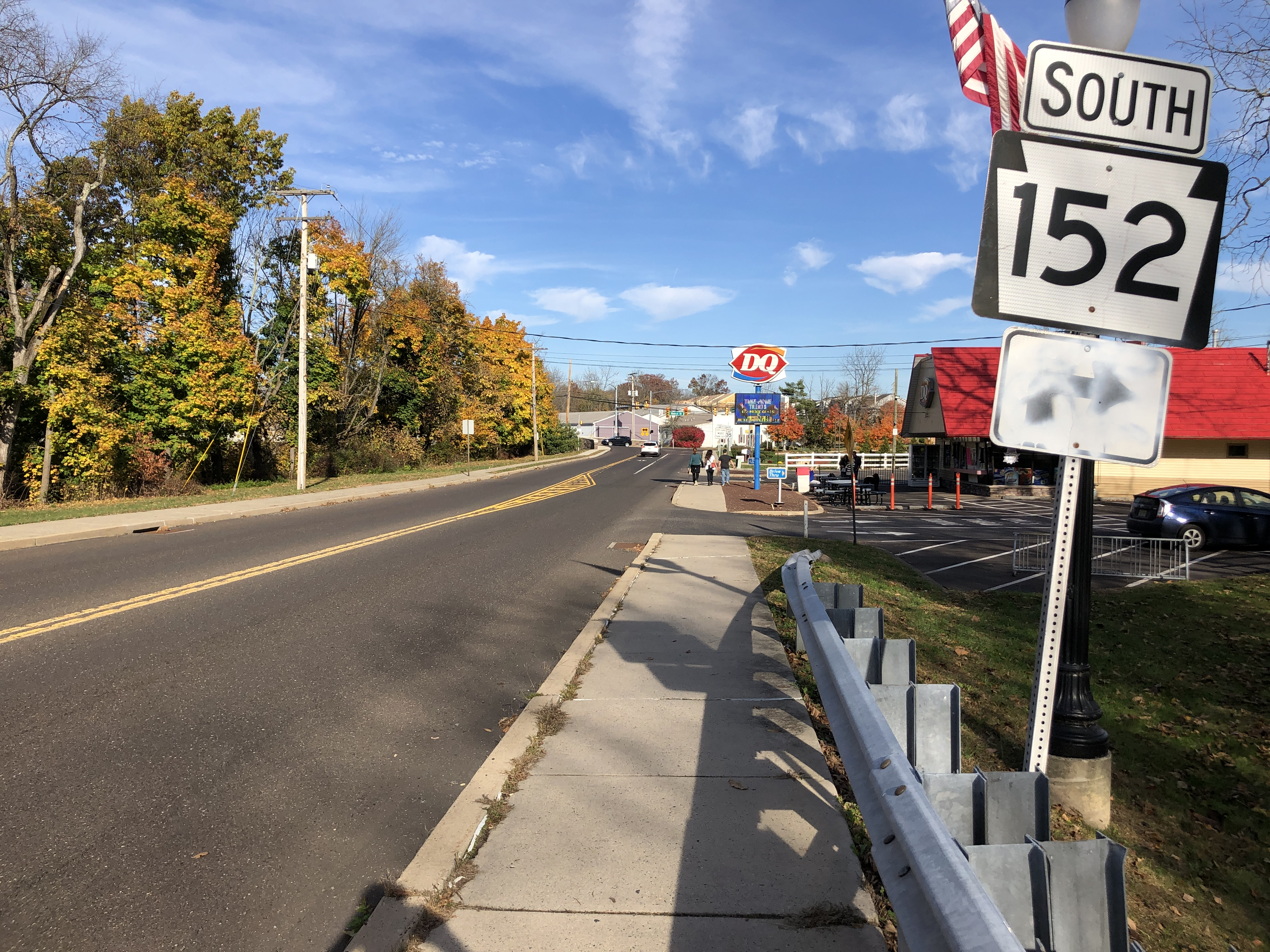
PA 152 southbound in Perkasie

As of 2015 there were 32.39 miles (52.13 km) of public roads in Perkasie, of which 6.36 miles (10.24 km) were maintained by the Pennsylvania Department of Transportation (PennDOT) and 26.03 miles (41.89 km) were maintained by the borough.

PA 152 runs through the southern portion of Perkasie, while PA 563 runs along the northwestern edge of the borough. PA 313 passes to the east, PA 113 passes to the south and PA 309 passes to the west. The nearest Interstate Highways are I-476, I-276 and I-78.

The borough's nearest airport is Pennridge Airport, a public general aviation airport with one 4,200-foot (1,300 m)-long runway. It is just north of the center of town, on the other side of the East Rockhill Township border.

There is currently no public transportation in Perkasie. Perkasie was once served by the Reading Railroad's North Penn Division, also known as the Bethlehem Branch, which was once part of the North Pennsylvania Railroad. The line is now owned by SEPTA, which ended passenger service in the early 1980s. The last SEPTA-operated Bethlehem Line Philadelphia-bound passenger train passed through Perkasie on July 29, 1981. Conrail subsequently continued freight operations out of Lansdale up to Quakertown until the mid 90s. The East Penn Railroad, formally known as East Penn Railway (EPRY), leased a portion of the railroad from SEPTA, saving the line from abandonment from Telford through to Quakertown. SEPTA recently issued a formal proposal to perform maintenance on the line and restore passenger service, either installing catenary for electric trains, or using diesel trains connecting to the Lansdale/Doylestown Line in Lansdale. The project would take at least five years.

As of late 2009, unmarked freight cars, particularly covered hoppers, are stored along the southbound track in Perkasie between Market Street and Park Avenue, from Park Avenue to the Old Bethlehem Pike Bridge, and so on to Meetinghouse Road in Telford. East Penn through Perkasie with ex-Conrail B23-7 3153 runs about two to three times a week, passing through Perkasie to Telford, and again passing through Perkasie while returning to Quakertown. The trains usually run between 10:00am and 4:00pm during the week.

One feature of the rail line through Perkasie is the Perkasie Tunnel. The southern portal of the tunnel is just southeast of the intersection of Ridge Road, Ridge Avenue and Tunnel Road in Perkasie, while the northern portal is near the southwest end of Pennridge Airport in East Rockhill Township.

=== Utilities ===
The Perkasie Borough Electric Department provides electricity to the borough. The electric department originated out of a need to improve street lighting, using a generator before a power plant was built in 1900. In 1947, with the growth in demand for electricity, the borough kept the electric distribution system but begin receiving electricity wholesale from Pennsylvania Power & Light (now PPL Corporation). A modern substation serving the borough's electric system was constructed in 1995. The Perkasie Borough Electric Department currently purchases its electricity wholesale from multiple sources. The borough's Public Works department provides trash collection and recycling, while natural gas service is provided by UGI Utilities.

== Climate ==
According to the Köppen climate classification system, Perkasie has a Hot-summer, Humid continental climate (Dfa). Dfa climates are characterized by at least one month having an average mean temperature ≤ 32.0 °F (0.0 °C), at least four months with an average mean temperature ≥ 50.0 °F (10.0 °C), at least one month with an average mean temperature ≥ 71.6 °F (22.0 °C) and no significant precipitation difference between seasons. Although most summer days are slightly humid in Perkasie, episodes of heat and high humidity can occur with heat index values > 105 °F (41 °C). Since 1981, the highest air temperature was 101.7 °F (38.7 °C) on 07/22/2011, and the highest daily average mean dew point was 74.5 °F (23.6 °C) on 08/12/2016. The average wettest month is July which corresponds with the annual peak in thunderstorm activity. Since 1981, the wettest calendar day was 6.87 inches (174 mm) on 08/27/2011. During the winter months, the average annual extreme minimum air temperature is −1.1 °F (−18.4 °C). Since 1981, the coldest air temperature was −12.9 °F (−24.9 °C) on 01/22/1984. Episodes of extreme cold and wind can occur with wind chill values < −12 °F (−24 °C). The average annual snowfall (Nov-Apr) is between 30 inches (76 cm) and 36 inches (91 cm). Ice storms and large snowstorms depositing ≥ 12 inches (30 cm) of snow occur once every few years, particularly during nor’easters from December through February.

Climate data for Perkasie, Elevation 377 ft (115 m), 1981–2010 normals, extremes 1981–2018
Month	Jan	Feb	Mar	Apr	May	Jun	Jul	Aug	Sep	Oct	Nov	Dec	Year
Record high °F (°C)	70.5 (21.4)	77.9 (25.5)	86.1 (30.1)	92.9 (33.8)	94.3 (34.6)	95.4 (35.2)	101.7 (38.7)	99.3 (37.4)	96.9 (36.1)	88.4 (31.3)	80.1 (26.7)	74.7 (23.7)	101.7 (38.7)
Mean daily maximum °F (°C)	38.4 (3.6)	41.8 (5.4)	50.1 (10.1)	62.3 (16.8)	72.4 (22.4)	81.0 (27.2)	85.0 (29.4)	83.4 (28.6)	76.6 (24.8)	65.0 (18.3)	53.9 (12.2)	42.5 (5.8)	62.8 (17.1)
Daily mean °F (°C)	29.8 (−1.2)	32.6 (0.3)	40.2 (4.6)	51.1 (10.6)	60.8 (16.0)	69.9 (21.1)	74.3 (23.5)	72.8 (22.7)	65.4 (18.6)	53.7 (12.1)	44.0 (6.7)	34.2 (1.2)	52.5 (11.4)
Mean daily minimum °F (°C)	21.2 (−6.0)	23.3 (−4.8)	30.2 (−1.0)	39.8 (4.3)	49.3 (9.6)	58.8 (14.9)	63.7 (17.6)	62.1 (16.7)	54.2 (12.3)	42.5 (5.8)	34.1 (1.2)	25.8 (−3.4)	42.2 (5.7)
Record low °F (°C)	−12.9 (−24.9)	−5.1 (−20.6)	1.9 (−16.7)	16.6 (−8.6)	30.2 (−1.0)	40.4 (4.7)	46.8 (8.2)	41.5 (5.3)	34.4 (1.3)	23.1 (−4.9)	10.4 (−12.0)	−2.5 (−19.2)	−12.9 (−24.9)
Average precipitation inches (mm)	3.45 (88)	2.84 (72)	3.87 (98)	4.10 (104)	4.34 (110)	4.39 (112)	4.76 (121)	3.89 (99)	4.54 (115)	4.31 (109)	3.73 (95)	3.97 (101)	48.19 (1,224)
Average relative humidity (%)	67.9	64.6	60.4	58.8	63.4	68.6	68.8	71.1	72.2	71.2	70.2	69.9	67.3
Average dew point °F (°C)	20.5 (−6.4)	22.0 (−5.6)	27.6 (−2.4)	37.2 (2.9)	48.3 (9.1)	59.1 (15.1)	63.4 (17.4)	62.9 (17.2)	56.2 (13.4)	44.6 (7.0)	34.9 (1.6)	25.4 (−3.7)	41.9 (5.5)
Source: PRISM

== Ecology ==
According to the A. W. Kuchler U.S. potential natural vegetation types, Perkasie would have a dominant vegetation type of Appalachian Oak (104) with a dominant vegetation form of Eastern Hardwood Forest (25). The plant hardiness zone is 6b with an average annual extreme minimum air temperature of −1.1 °F (−18.4 °C). The spring bloom typically begins by April 12 and fall color usually peaks by October 28.

== Notable people ==
- Dick Allen, Philadelphia Phillies slugger, former owner of a horse farm in Perkasie
- Jake Crouthamel, longtime Syracuse University athletic director and key figure in the formation of the original Big East Conference
- Jake Eisenhart, Cincinnati Reds baseball pitcher, b. October 3, 1922, in Perkasie
- Tom Fulp, creator of the entertainment website Newgrounds
- Brittany Furlan, comedian and YouTube personality
