= Quakertown Community School District =

School district in Pennsylvania

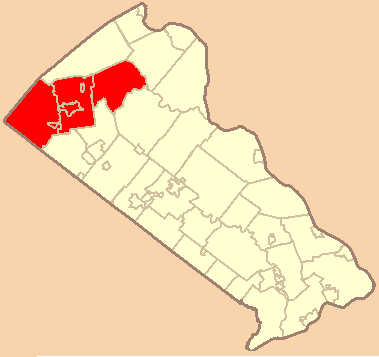
- Location of Quakertown Community School District in Bucks County, Pennsylvania

Quakertown Community School District is a public school district located in Bucks County, Pennsylvania. The Quakertown Community School District covers 72 square miles and serves the boroughs of Quakertown, Richlandtown, and Trumbauersville; as well as Haycock, Milford, and Richland Townships. Quakertown's mascot is the panther.

== Schools ==
- Quakertown Community High School
- Sixth Grade Center
- Strayer Middle School
- Neidig Elementary School
- Pfaff Elementary School
- Quakertown Elementary School
- Richland Elementary School
- Trumbauersville Elementary School

== Music program ==
Quakertown has a parent-sponsored music support program that promotes the arts amongst QCSD, most notably at the high school level. Quakertown Music Promoters Organization (QMPO) helps to raise funds to defray costs of band competitions, district/region/state auditions, busing to various events, musicals, etc. Quakertown Panther Marching Band has won competitions on district, region and state levels. It has sent multiple students to the PMEA District, Region, and State Band Competitions. Quakertown Select Choir has toured to such places as Bermuda, Myrtle Beach, and other destinations. The Marching band travels to Florida every other year, and recently took a trip to California. They produce a musical every other year. QHS Select Choir also sends students to district, region, state, and All-Eastern competitions. The school has tried to shut down the music program many times because of “funding” but they were never successful.
