= Oreland, Pennsylvania =

Unincorporated community in Pennsylvania, US

Oreland
- Census-designated place
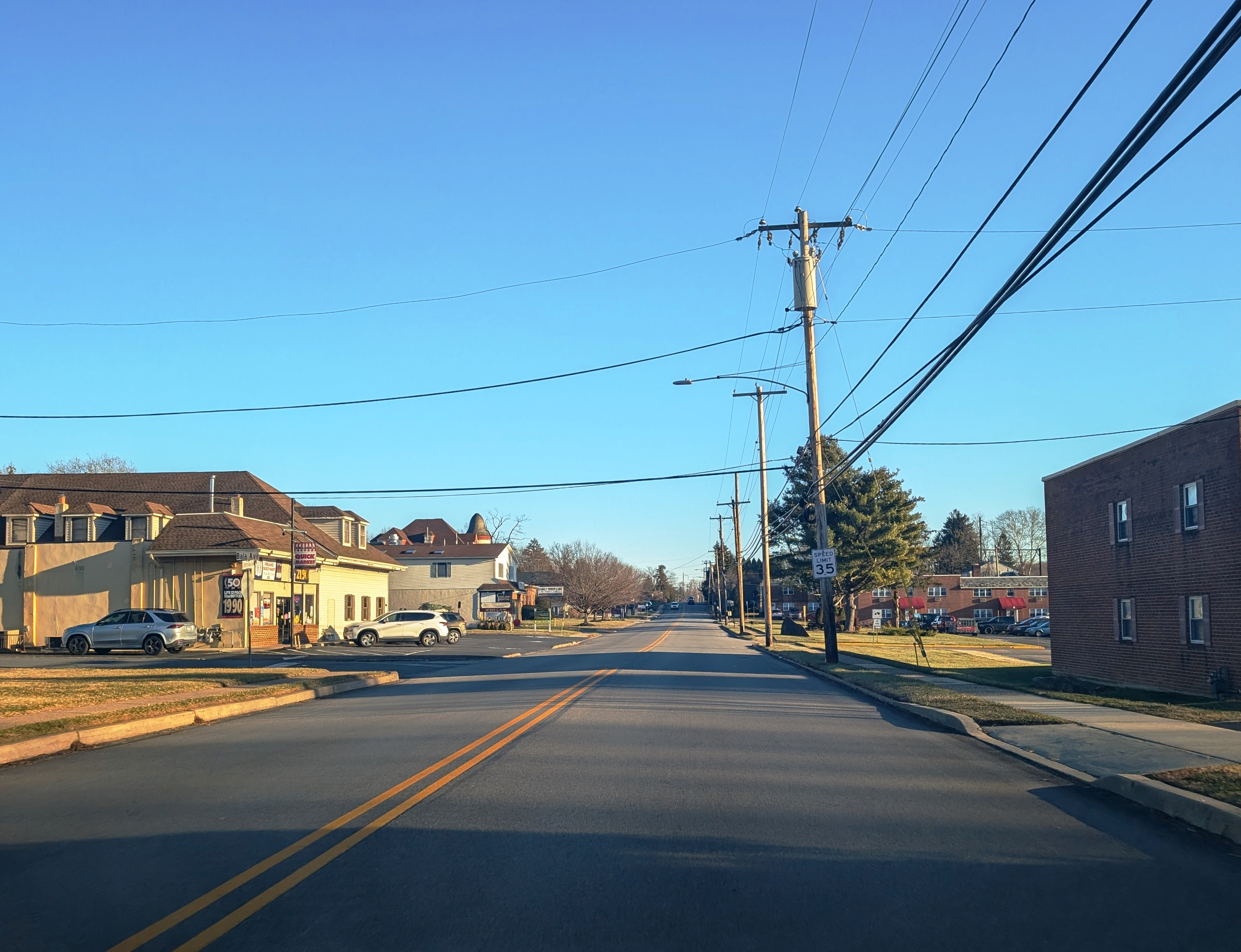
- Pennsylvania Avenue eastbound through Oreland

- Location of Oreland in Pennsylvania Oreland (the United States)
- Coordinates: 40°06′52″N 75°10′48″W
- Country: United States
- State: Pennsylvania
- County: Montgomery
- Townships: Springfield, Upper Dublin

Area
  - Total: 1.51 sq mi (3.91 km^{2})
  - Land: 1.51 sq mi (3.91 km^{2})
  - Water: 0 sq mi (0.00 km^{2})
- Elevation: 259 ft (79 m)

Population (2020)
  - Total: 6,210
  - Density: 4,114.7/sq mi (1,588.71/km^{2})
- Time zone: UTC-5 (EST)
  - Summer (DST): UTC-4 (EDT)
- ZIP code: 19075
- Area codes: 215, 267, and 445
- FIPS code: 42-57024

Oreland is a United States census-designated place (CDP) in Springfield and Upper Dublin townships, just outside the Chestnut Hill and Mount Airy areas of Philadelphia, Pennsylvania, United States. Oreland has a ZIP code of 19075, and the population was 5,678 at the 2010 census.

== Geography ==
Oreland is located at 40°6′52″N 75°10′48″W (40.114510, -75.179880).

According to the United States Census Bureau, the CDP has a total area of 1.5 square miles (3.9 km^{2}), all land.

== History ==
Oreland, as part of Springfield Township, was settled as one of William Penn's manors.

In 1686, Thomas Fitzwater discovered vast lime deposits on his land in Oreland. He erected a kiln to process it, which by 1693 had attracted the attention of William Penn. Penn ordered a highway built from the port of the Delaware River to the kiln. Named Limekiln Pike, and still in existence today, it was one of the first roads in the area. These lime deposits and the ore deposits also found in the area gave Oreland its name. Mining and farming would dominate Oreland's economy until the 20th century, when Oreland transformed into a residential suburb of Philadelphia, as it remains today.

The village of Oreland was not laid out until 1889 near the North Penn Railroad running along the east side of town (currently SEPTA's Lansdale/Doylestown Line). The Plymouth Railroad ran from Conshohocken to Oreland through Plymouth and Flourtown. The tracks were mostly removed in the 1980s. The path where the trains used to run begins northeast of the Oreland Station Apartments, next to Ehrenpfort Road, and runs southwest towards Flourtown. The actual tracks, which still connect to SEPTA's Lansdale/Doylestown Line, end near the corner of Montgomery Avenue and Lyster Road. The path continues all the way to Flourtown, although in the 1990s the path was cut at Oreland Mill Road by housing built on both sides. The remainder of the path today is used primarily by children, runners and bikers.

A bronze tablet, installed in 1928, marks where Emlen House is located. Emlen House served as George Washington's headquarters while in neighboring Whitemarsh from November 2 until December 11, 1777 during the Revolutionary War . In the early 1900s it was owned by Frances and A. J. Antello Devereux and named "Mistfield Farm". In 1956, it was purchased by Edward Piszek, founder of Mrs. Paul's Kitchens, a frozen seafood company. It was in the Piszek family until 2013 when it was sold to a developer. The location of the farm straddles Oreland and Whitemarsh.

== Notable people ==
- Wesley E. Craig, US Army major general
- Tommy Conwell, frontman of the band Tommy Conwell & The Young Rumblers
- Jim Curtin, is a retired American soccer player and was the head coach for the Philadelphia Union until November 2024. Curtin played most of his career for the Chicago Fire
- Adam Goren, only member of the synth-punk band, Atom and his Package
- Wayne Hardin, former college football coach for Navy and Temple University. Coach Hardin is a member of the College Football Hall of Fame

== Education ==
=== Public schools ===
For the Springfield township portion of Oreland, which is in the Springfield Township School District, the public schools are:

- Springfield Elementary School, Enfield Campus and Erdenheim Campus
- Springfield Middle School
- Springfield Township High School

Only Enfield Elementary and Springfield Middle School are located in Oreland; the others are located in the neighboring town of Erdenheim. Oreland is one of four towns that shares the Springfield Township Public School District.

For the Upper Dublin township portion of Oreland, which is in the Upper Dublin School District, the public schools are:

- Jarrettown Elementary School
- Sandy Run Middle School
- Upper Dublin High School

=== Catholic schools ===
- Norwood-Fontbonne Academy - An independent private Catholic school in nearby Chestnut Hill that serves students age 3 - 8th grade.

== Demographics ==
Historical population
| Census | Pop. | Note | %± |
|---|---|---|---|
| 1990 | 5,695 | | — |
| 2000 | 5,509 | | −3.3% |
| 2010 | 5,678 | | 3.1% |
| 2020 | 6,210 | | 9.4% |

As of the census of 2010, there were 5,678 people, 2,138 households, and 1,601 families residing in the CDP. The population density was 3,883.7 people per square mile. There were 2,188 housing units at an average density of 1,498.6/sq mi. The racial makeup of the CDP was 79.71% White, 14.58% African American, 0.11% Native American, 2.73% Asian, 0.81% from other races, and 2.04% from two or more races. Hispanic or Latino of any race were 2.45% of the population.

There were 2,138 households, out of which 35.9% had children under the age of 18 living with them, 58.3% were married couples living together, 13.4% had a female householder with no husband present, and 25.1% were non-families. 21.4% of all households were made up of individuals, and 9.7% had someone living alone who was 65 years of age or older. The average household size was 2.65 and the average family size was 3.09.

In the CDP, the population was spread out, with 26.0% under the age of 18, 6.0% from 18 to 24, 26.0% from 25 to 44, 29.0% from 45 to 64, and 13.0% who were 65 years of age or older. The median age was 39.6 years. For every 100 females, there were 91.1 males. For every 100 females age 18 and over, there were 87.7 males.

As of the Census of 2000, the median income for a household in the CDP was $54,809, and the median income for a family was $67,542. Males had a median income of $50,260 versus $34,750 for females. The per capita income for the CDP was $24,256. About 4.5% of families and 5.8% of the population were below the poverty line, including 7.4% of those under age 18 and 8.3% of those age 65 or over.
