= Free Library of Springfield Township =

Coordinates: 40.09952°N 75.19560°W

The Free Library of Springfield Township is the public library system serving Springfield Township, Montgomery County, Pennsylvania, US.

== History ==
Founded in 1966, the Free Library of Springfield Township provides free access to over 60,000 educational and recreational materials to all Springfield Township and Montgomery County residents. Since its opening, the library has been dedicated to creating a community center for lifetime learning. FLS is a charter member of Access Pennsylvania, which allows patrons to use any participating Pennsylvania library, as well as a charter member of MCLINC, a consortium of libraries providing online, public access to Montgomery County library collections and online databases via library, home, and office computers.
