= Morris Arboretum =

Public park, University of Pennsylvania, USA

Morris Arboretum & Gardens
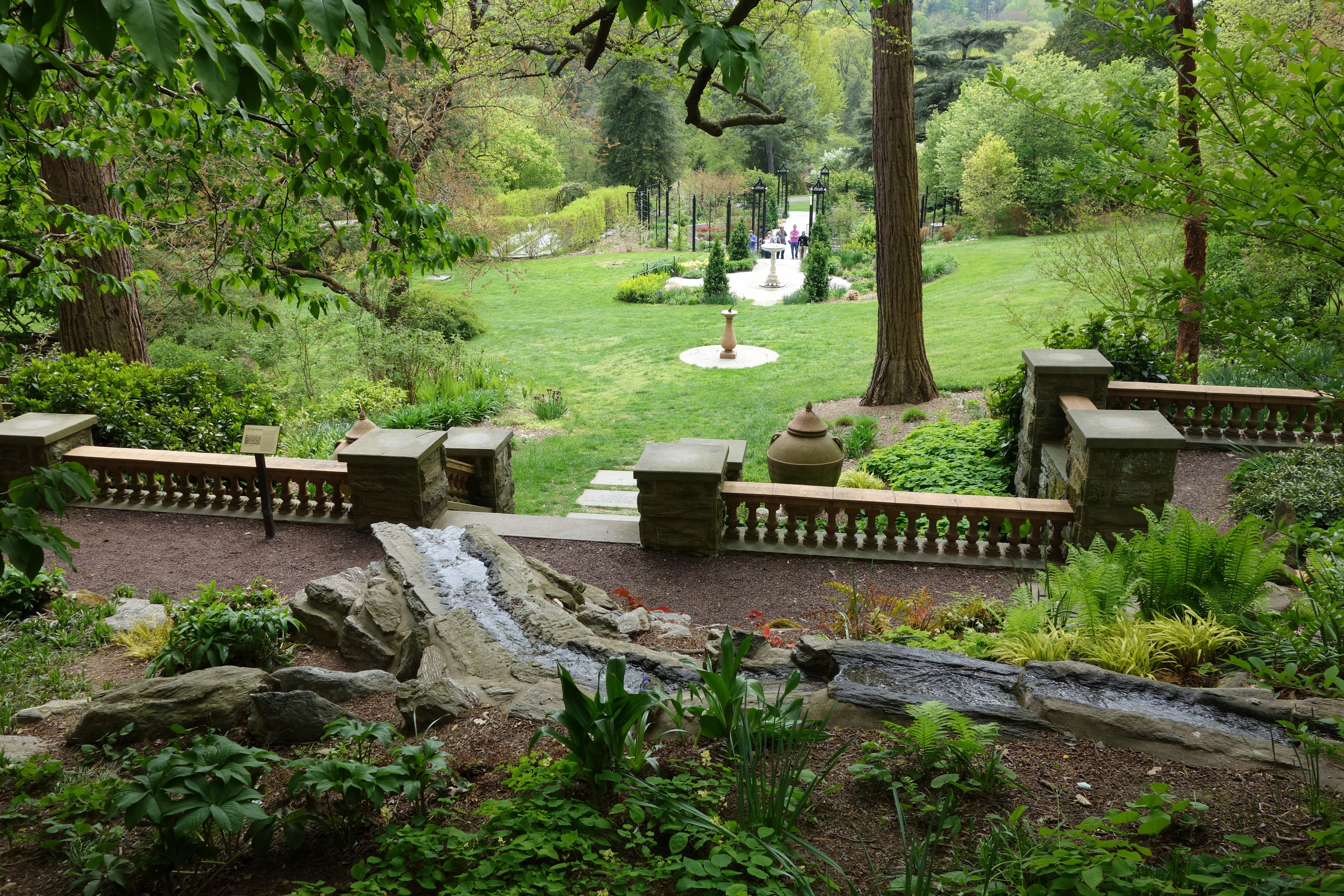

- Location within Philadelphia Location within Pennsylvania Location within the United States
- Type: Arboretum
- Location: 100 East Northwestern Avenue, Philadelphia and Whitemarsh Township, Pennsylvania
- Coordinates: 40°05′23″N 75°13′27″W
- Area: 92 acres (37 ha)
- Opened: 1887
- Operator: University of Pennsylvania
- Website: www.morrisarboretum.org
- Compton and Bloomfield
- U.S. National Register of Historic Places
- U.S. Historic district
- Area: 175 acres (71 ha)
- Built: 1889
- Architect: Theophilus Parsons Chandler Jr.; Wilson Eyre Jr., et al.
- Architectural style: Classical Revival, Late Gothic Revival
- NRHP reference No.: 78002445
- Added to NRHP: December 22, 1978

The Morris Arboretum & Gardens of the University of Pennsylvania (37 ha / 92 acres) is the official arboretum of the Commonwealth of Pennsylvania. The Arboretum is open daily except for major holidays. It is located at 100 East Northwestern Avenue, Chestnut Hill, Philadelphia, Pennsylvania.

== History ==
The Arboretum was formerly the estate of John T. (1847-1915) and Lydia T. Morris (1849-1932), a brother and sister who purchased and landscaped much of the arboretum's current site beginning in 1887. John Morris was interested in growing plants from around the world, including those collected in China by E. H. Wilson around 1900, and many of today's specimens date to Morris' original plantings. The estate became a public arboretum in 1933, after Lydia Morris' death.

== Collection ==
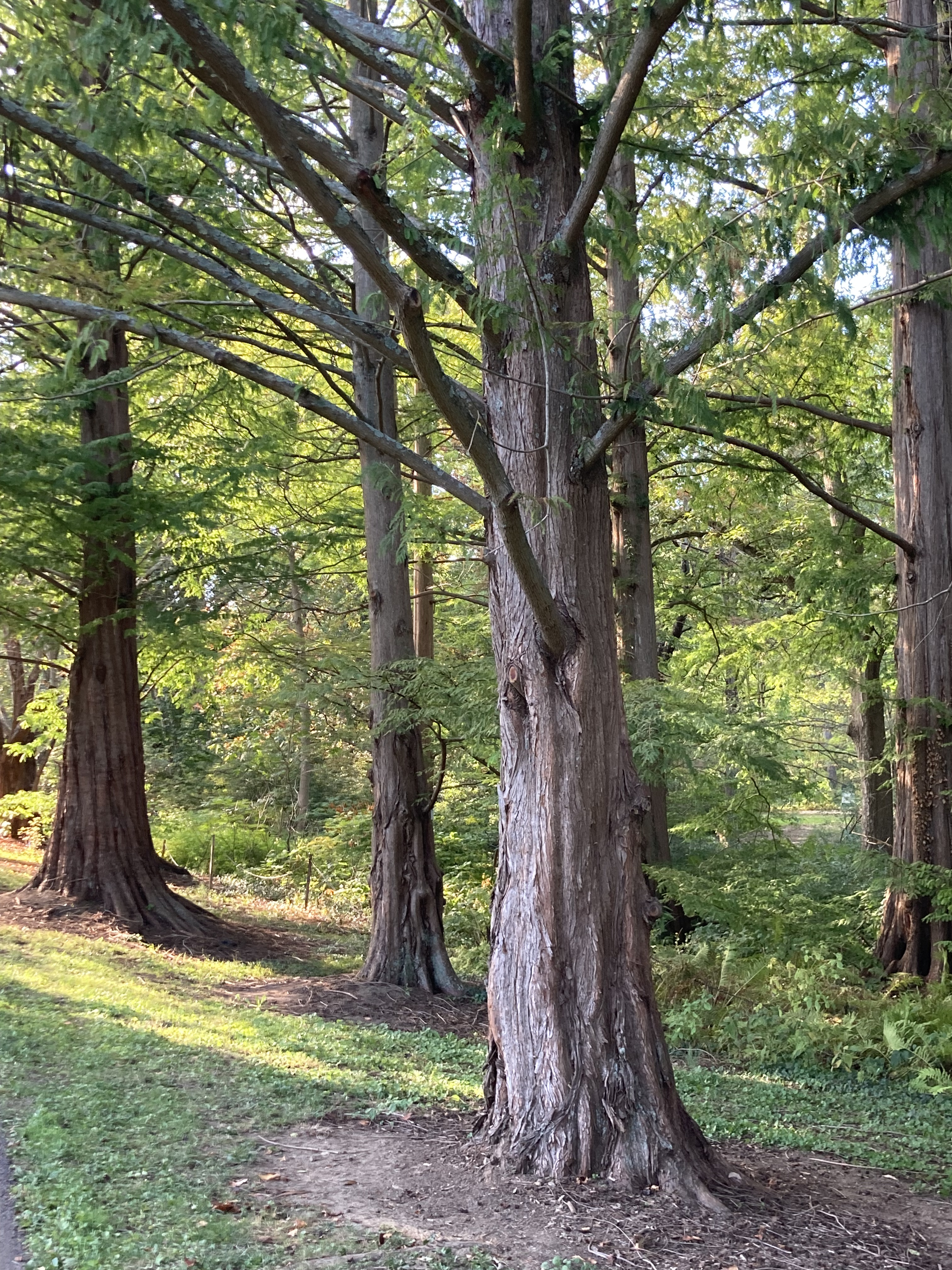
Metasequoia glyptostroboides (dawn redwoods)

Today the arboretum contains more than 11,000 labelled plants of over 2,500 taxa, representing the temperate floras of North America, Asia, and Europe. Significant collections include native azaleas, conifers, hollies, magnolia species, maples, roses, and witch-hazels.

The arboretum has identified 15 trees in its collection as outstanding specimens: Abies cephalonica, Abies holophylla, Acer buergerianum, Aesculus flava, Cedrus libani var. atlantica 'Glauca', Cercidiphyllum japonicum, Fagus sylvatica f. pendula, Metasequoia glyptostroboides, Pinus bungeana, Platanus × hispanica, Quercus alba, Tsuga canadensis f. pendula, Ulmus glabra 'Horizontalis', Ulmus parvifolia, and Zelkova serrata.

== Features ==
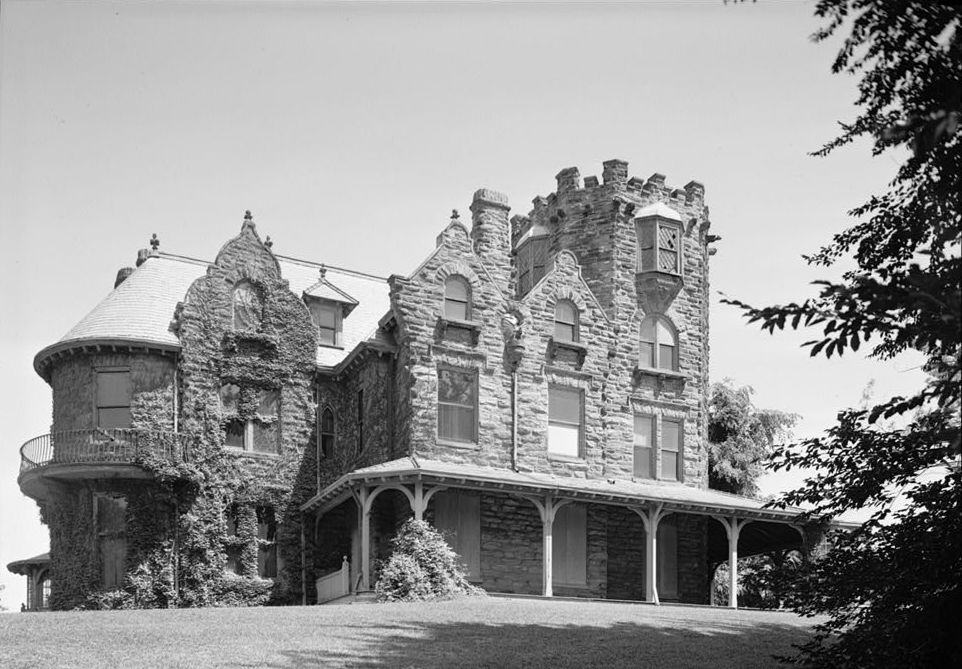
"Compton" (Lydia & John Thompson Morris mansion), (1887-88, demolished 1968), by Theophilus Parsons Chandler Jr., architect. The grounds are now the Morris Arboretum & Gardens of the University of Pennsylvania.

The arboretum is set within a fine, mature landscape, primarily designed in the English park style but with Japanese influences. It includes winding paths and streams, a swan pond, formal rose gardens, and large sweeps of azaleas, rhododendrons, and magnolias. Notable aspects of the arboretum are as follows:

- Compton Mansion (aka Morris House, 1887-1888, demolished 1968)
- Dawn Redwoods - Species of trees once thought to be extinct now found.
- English Park (circa 1912) - mainly planted with species collected in China, with significant collections of maples, witch hazels, dogwoods, cherries, and stuartias.
- Fernery (1899) - an 8-sided glass house said to be the only remaining free-standing Victorian fernery in North America. Morris "hired Japanese garden makers Kushibiki and Arai to arrange one hundred tons of local Wissahickon schist into rockery formations resembling a cave or mountain cliff accented by delicate waterfalls, a flowing stream bed, and a goldfish pond." He ordered his ferns from London experts William and John Birkenhead and botanically grouped and labelled the 523 fern and 47 Selaginella (club moss) varieties.
- Garden railway - G scale trains and trolley cars running on 45 mm track (1¾"), and representing railroads throughout history, including freight and passenger models.
- Greenhouse - closed to the public; little now remains of Morris' original structure.
- Hillcrest Pavilion - Restrooms, drinking fountains, and picnic benches with Hillcrest Avenue running behind it (hence the name).
- Japanese Overlook (1912) - a hybrid of English rock garden with Japanese garden, landscaped with fudo stones, stone lanterns, and Japanese maples, conifers, and smaller acid-loving plants.
- Japanese Hill and Water Garden (1905) - Tsukiyama-niwa style garden with hills, rocks, water, trees, bridges, paths, shrines and lanterns.
- Key Fountain - Key-Shaped decorative fountain in English Park
- Log Cabin - rustic log cabin with working hand-operated water pump
- Mercury Loggia and Ravine Garden (1913) - classical loggia housing a sculpture of "Mercury at rest", with grotto and a picturesque rock garden within the valley below.
- Meadow Parking Lot - Overflow parking lot located at bottom of the hill.
- Oak Alee - walkway lined with oak trees on both sides.
- Out on a Limb - metal walkway for close-up view of trees
- Pennock Garden - exotic flower garden with large rectangular fountain.
- Rose Garden (1888) - a buxus-edged rose garden in four quadrants with a fountain in the middle.
- Rock Wall Garden (1924) - alpine plants on a six-foot-high wall.
- Swan Pond (1905) - a small lake created by digging and damming the East Brook.
- Sculpture Garden
- Step Fountain - Staircase-shaped fountain in English Park
- Visitor Center & Gift Shop - Restrooms, Drinking Fountains, & light snacks for sale.

Morris Arboretum also owns Springfield Mill, which is located opposite the main entrance and not generally open to the public. The grist mill has been restored and is open for tours by request only.

== Gallery of features ==
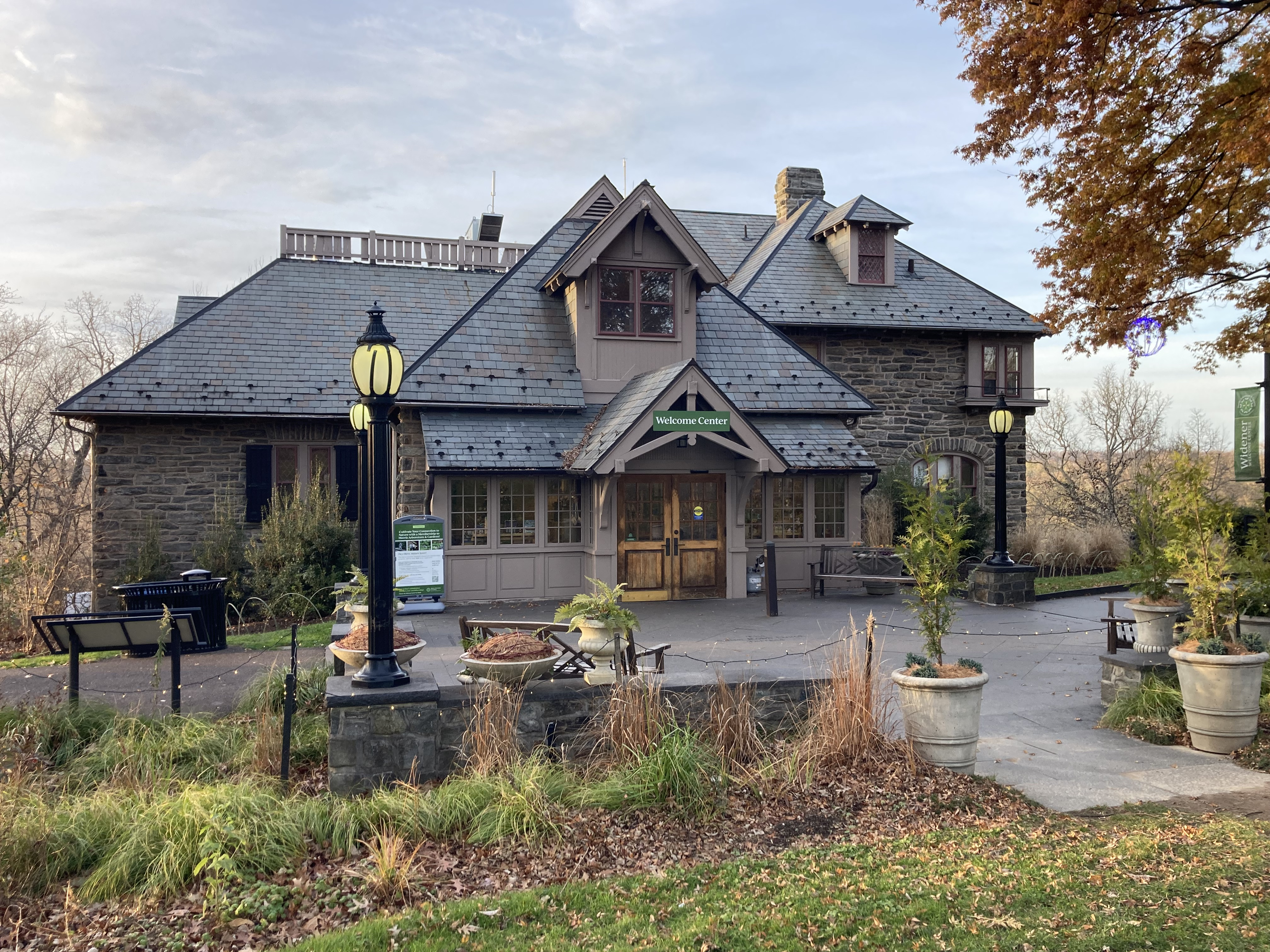
Visitor Center.

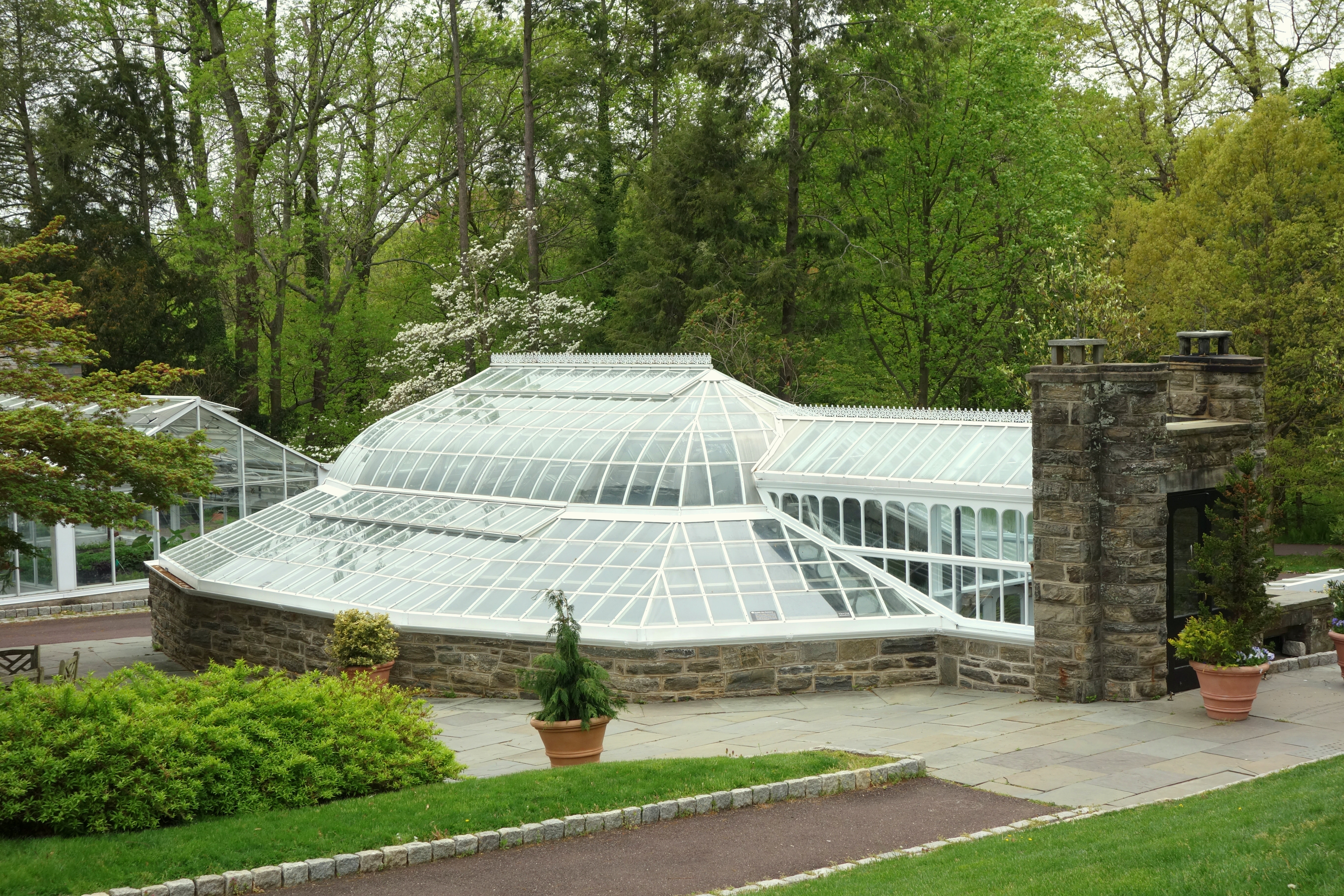
A greenhouse.

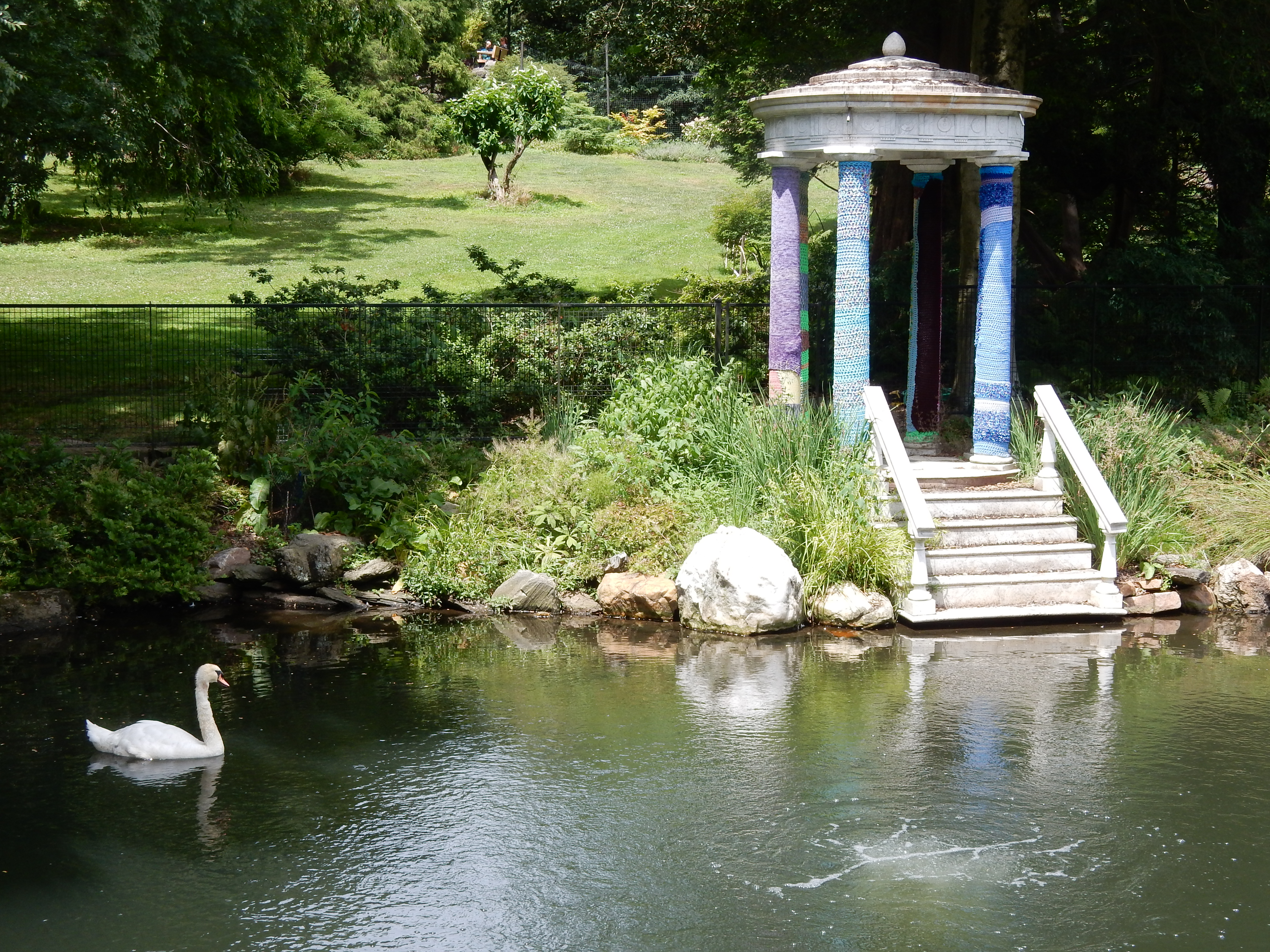
Swan Pond.

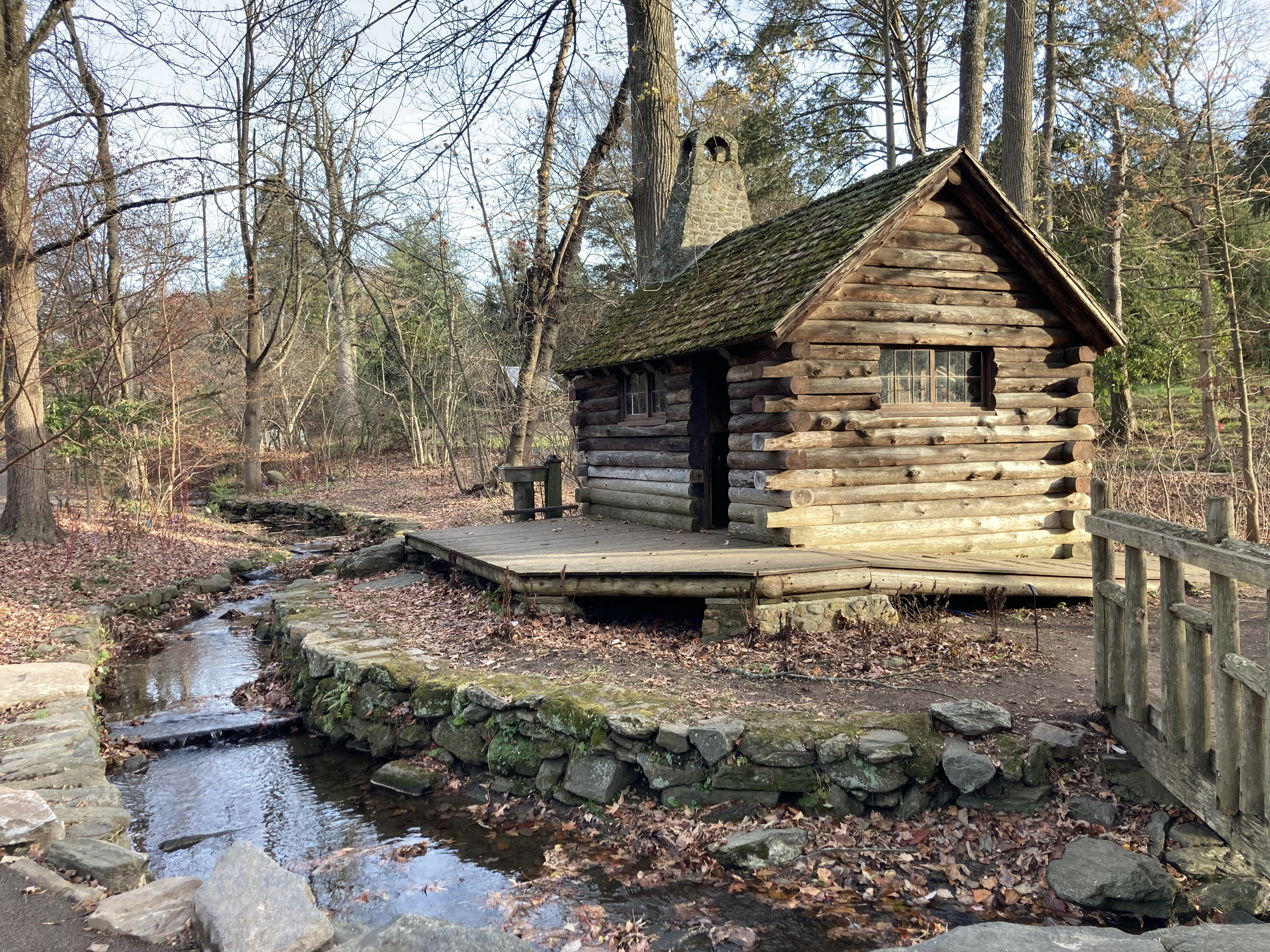
Log Cabin.

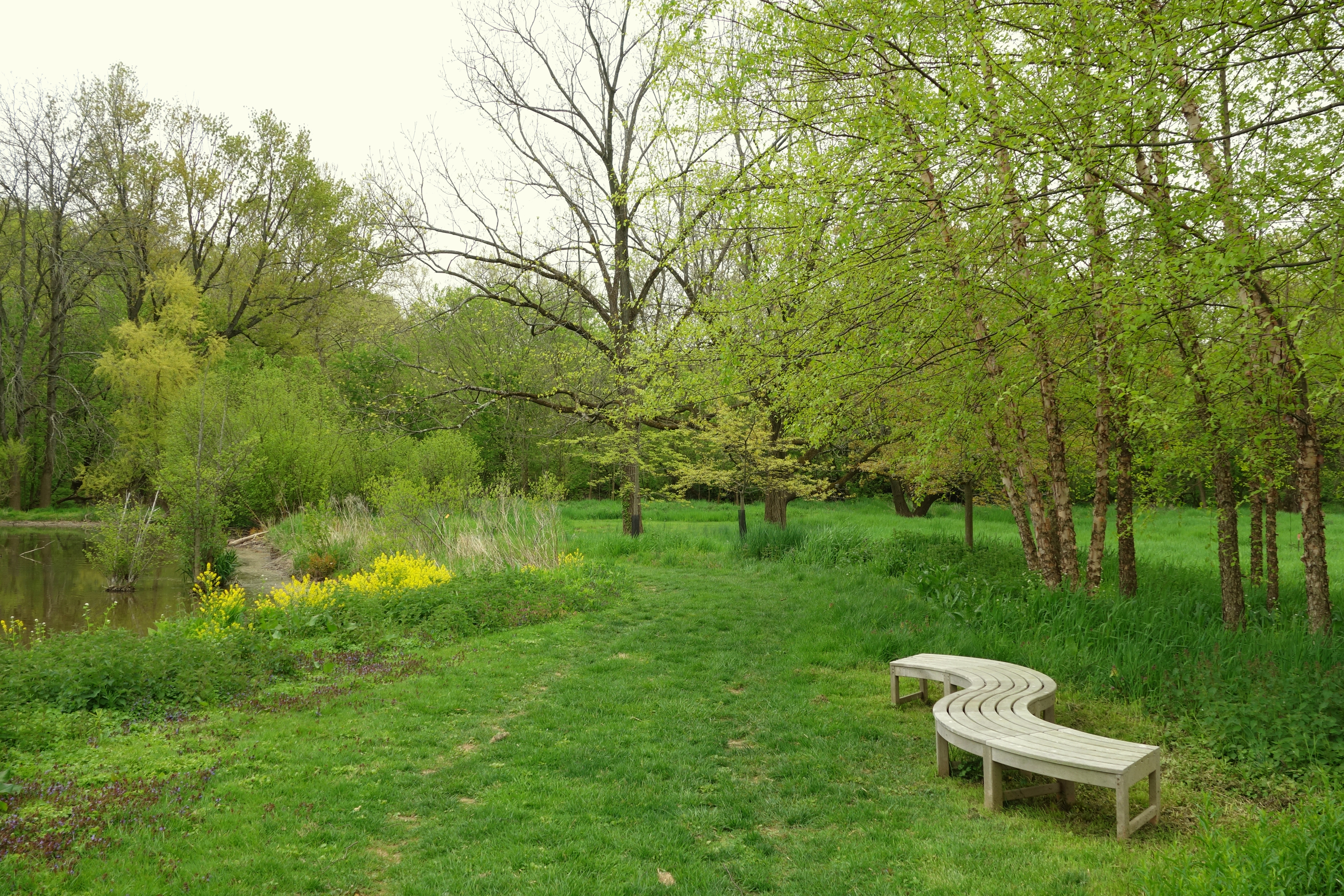
Seating area near a pond.

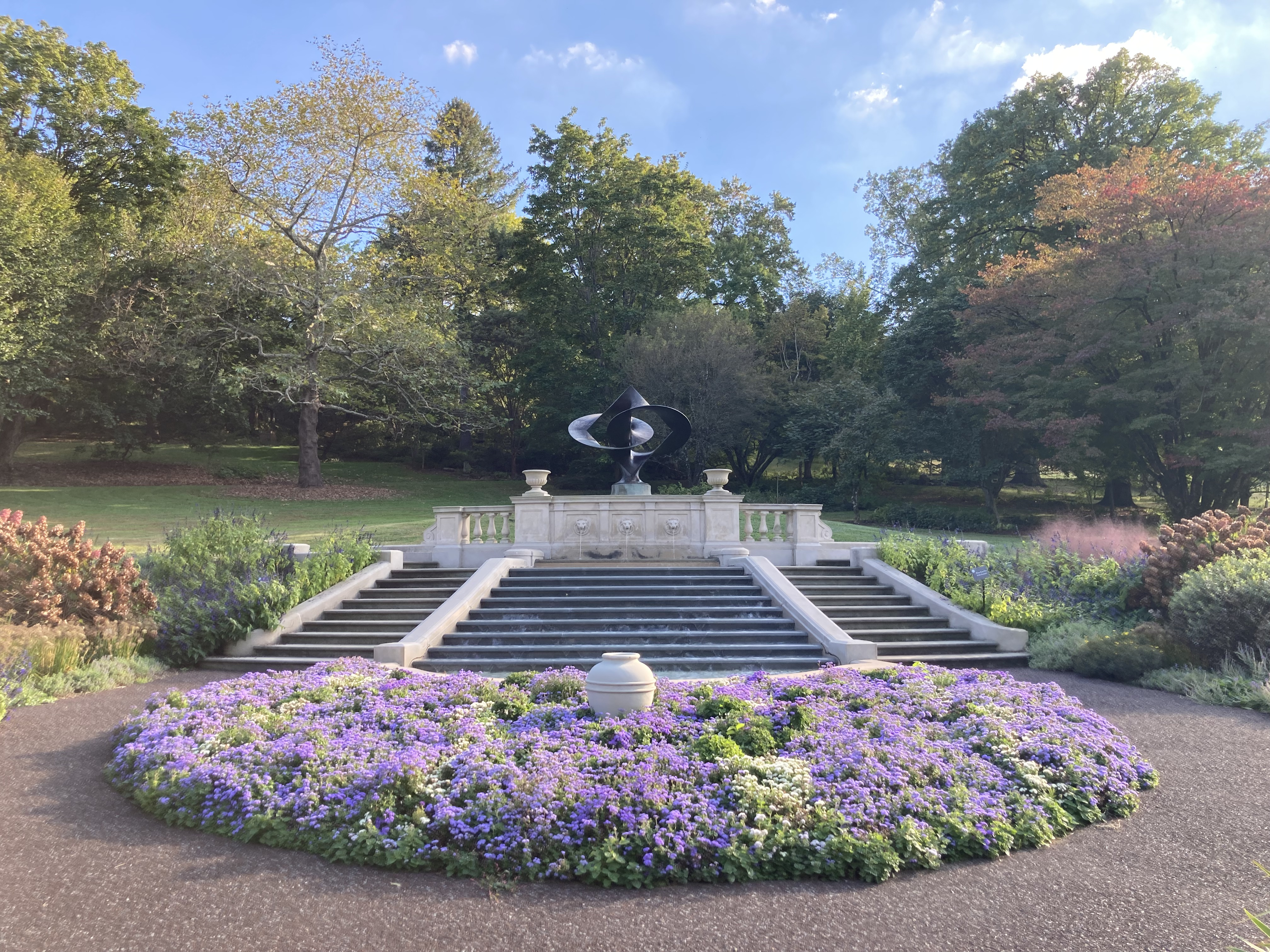
Step fountain.

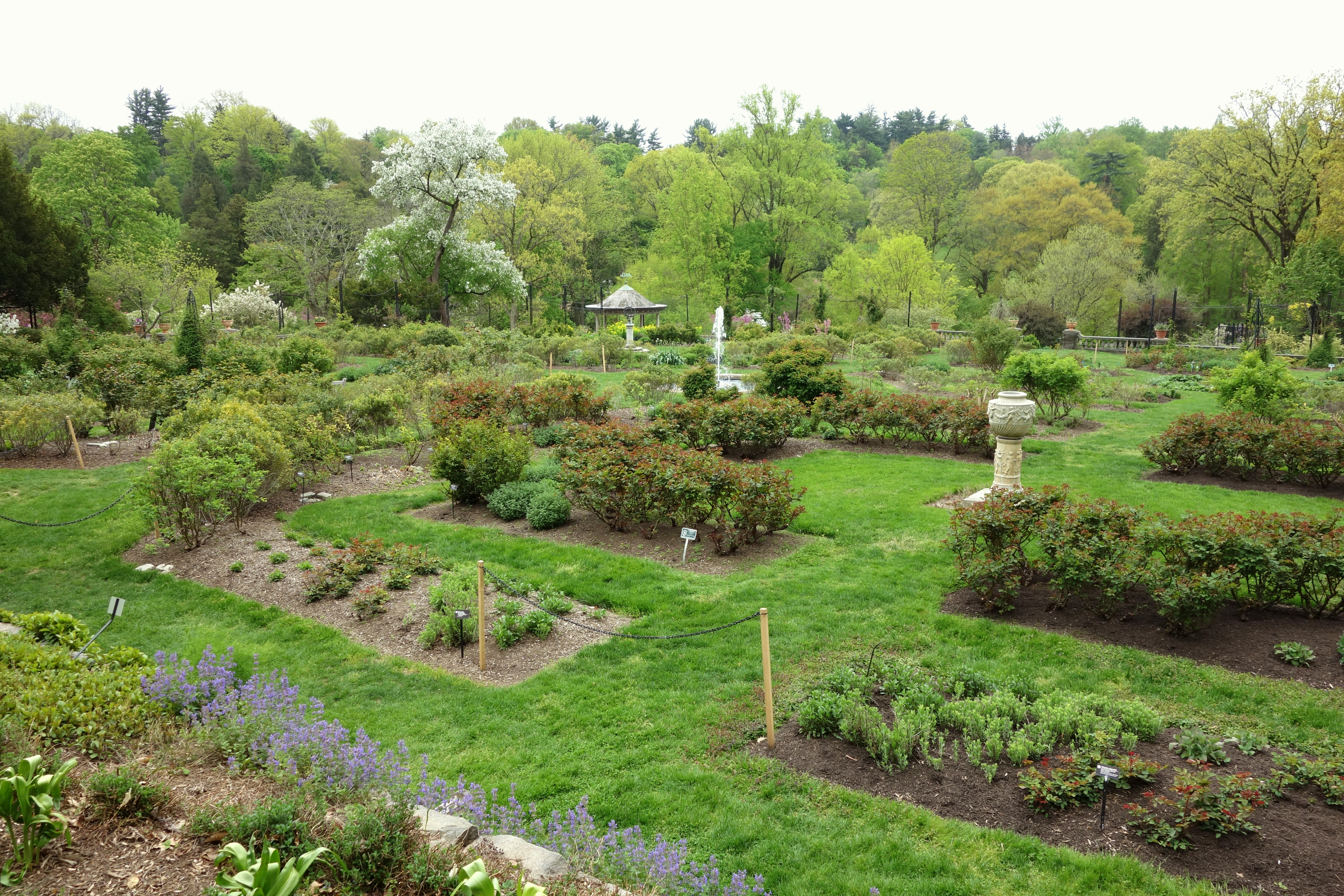
Rose garden.

== Gallery of plants and wildlife ==
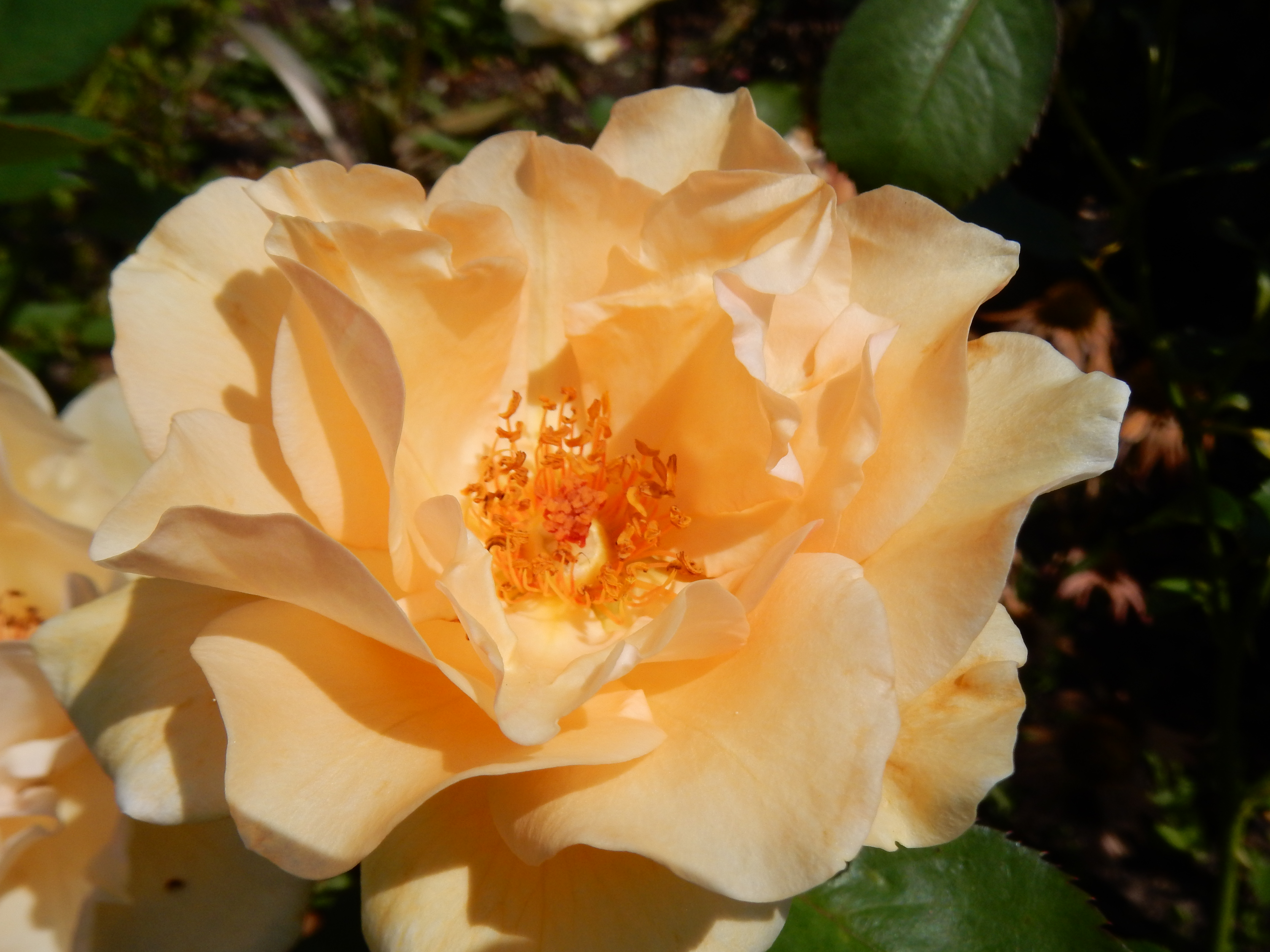
Winter Sunset, one of the rose species in the Rose Garden.

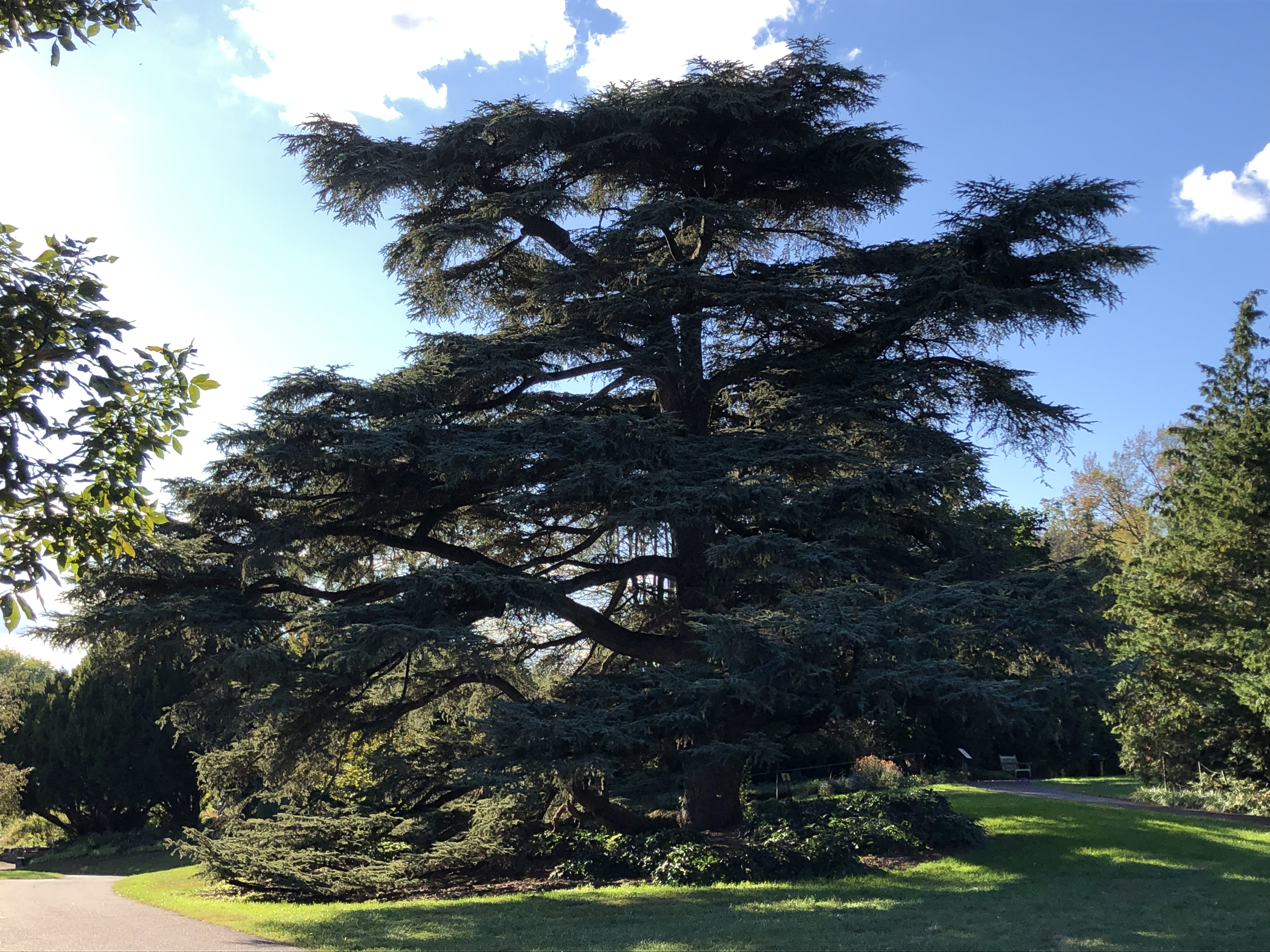
Blue Atlas Cedar tree.

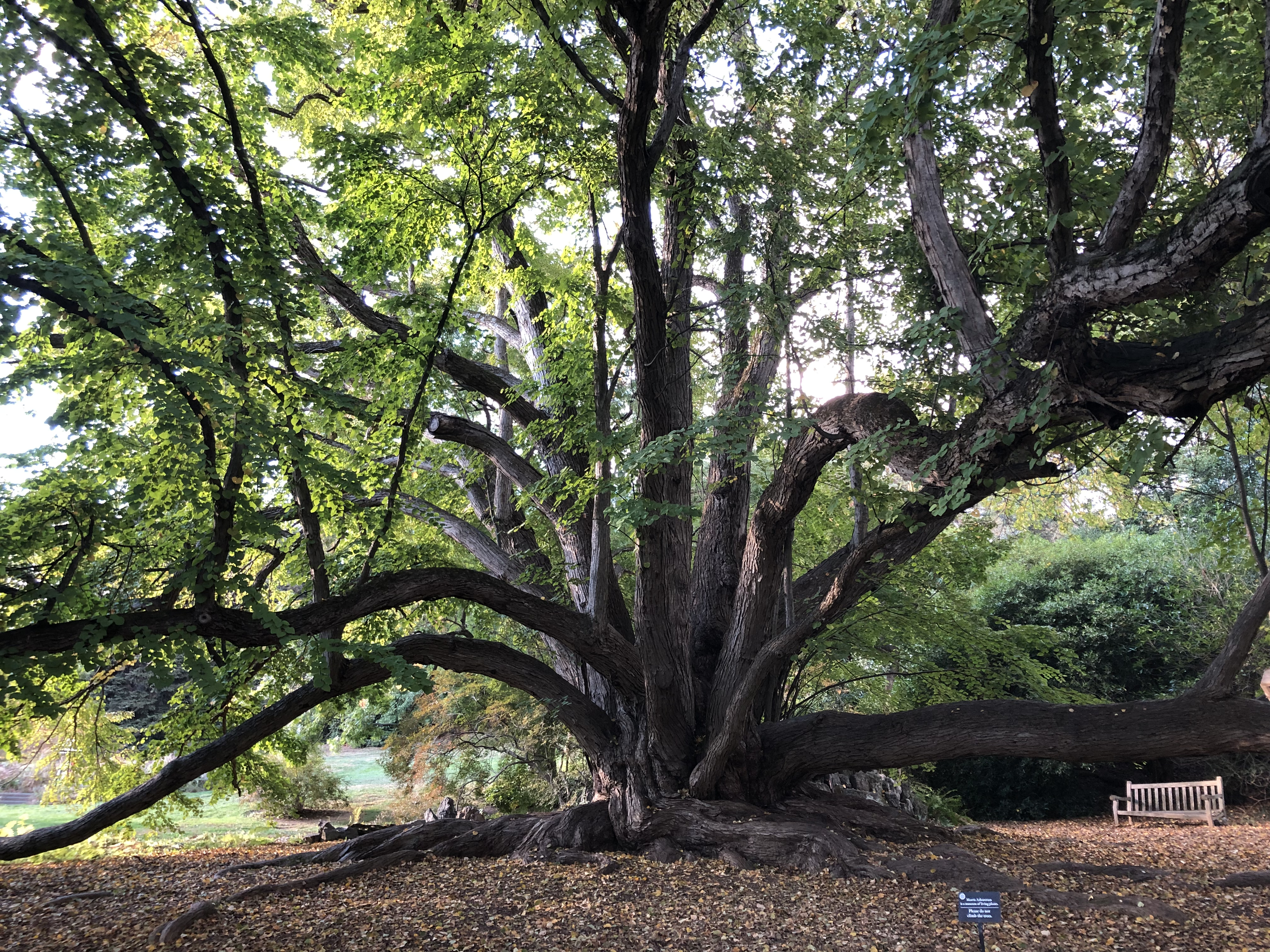
A Katsura tree.

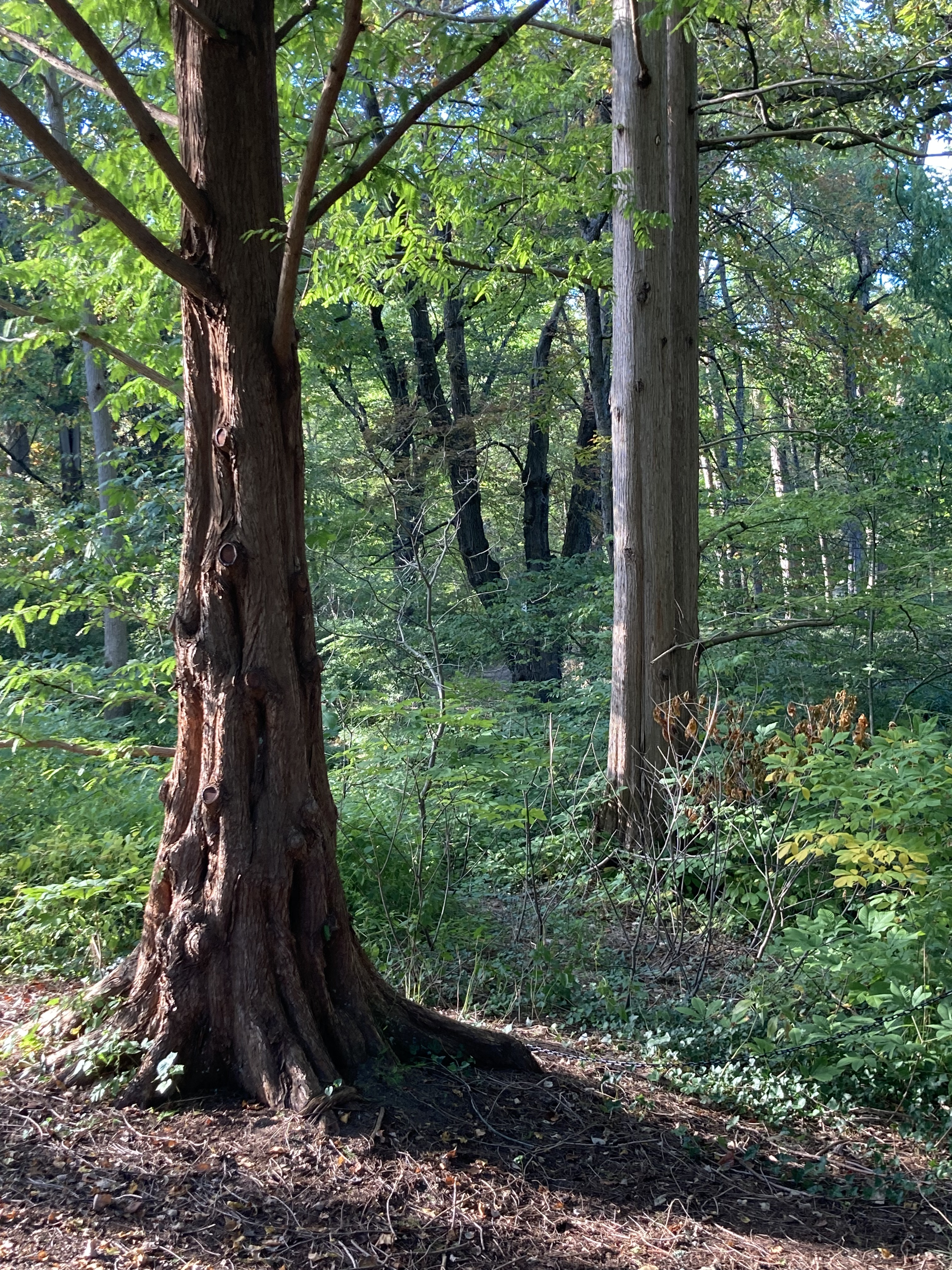
A Dawn Redwood.

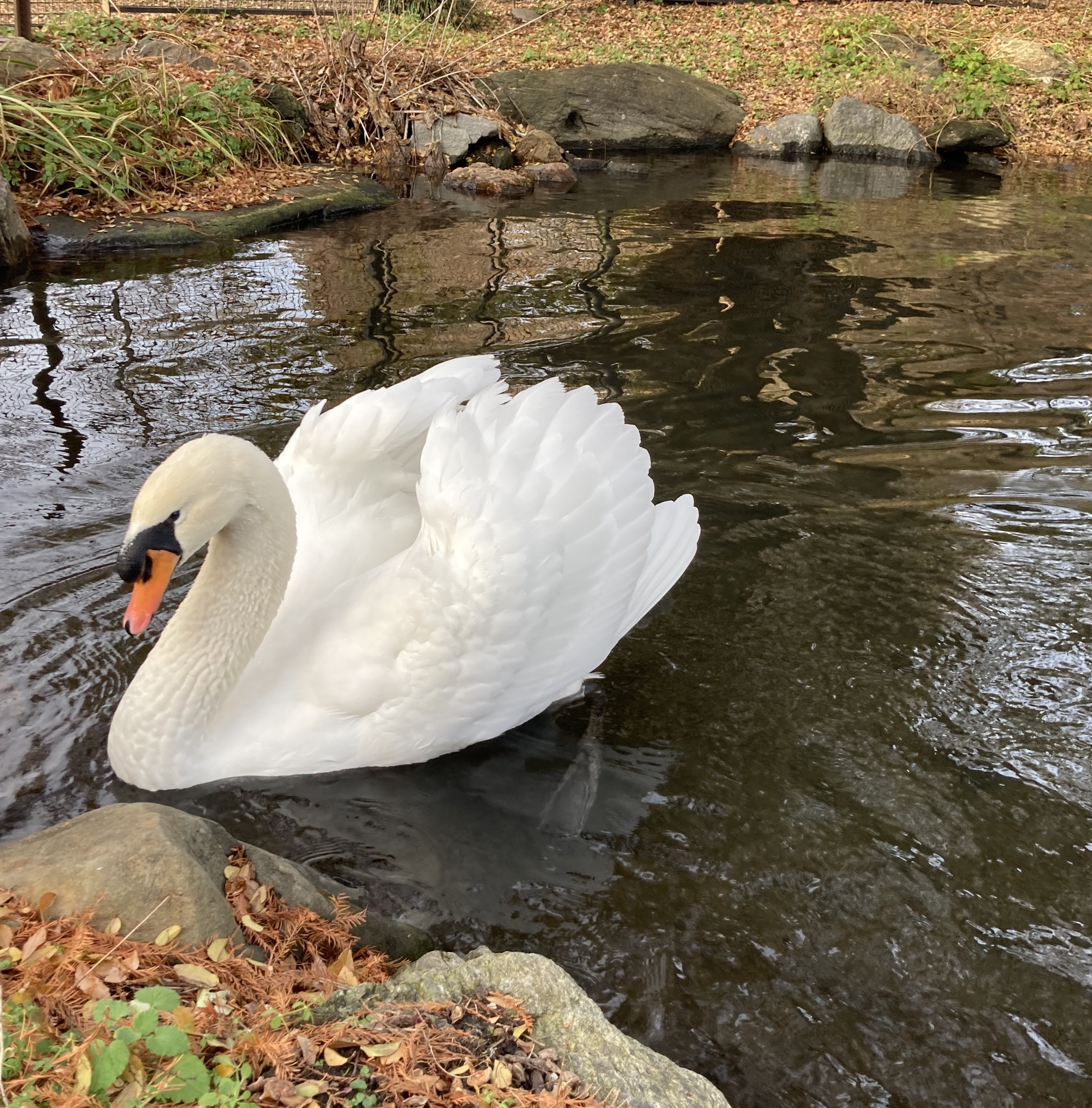
Mute Swan (Cygnus olor).

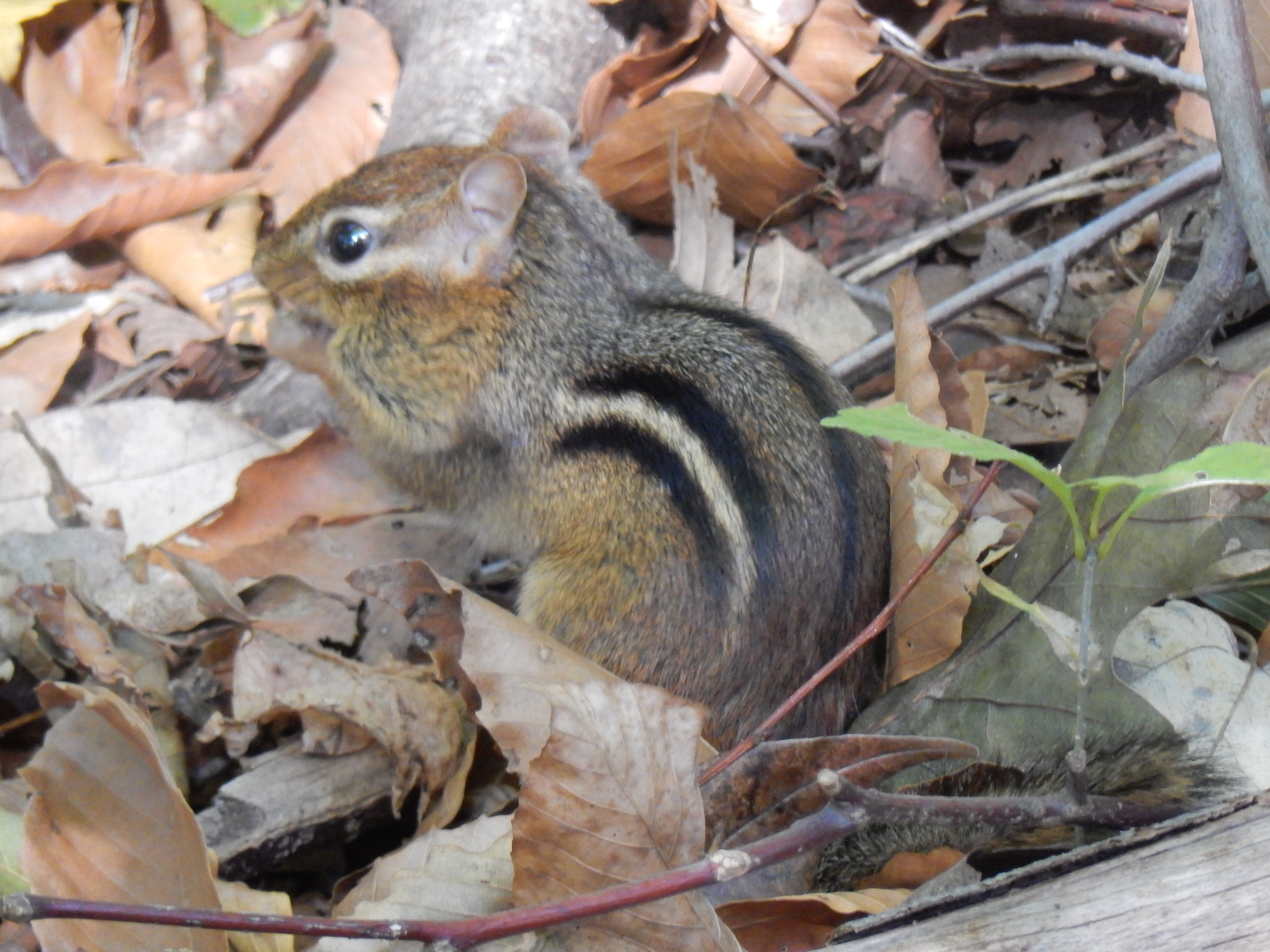
Eastern chipmunk (Tamias striatus).

== See also ==
- List of botanical gardens in the United States
- List of parks in Philadelphia
