= Flourtown, Pennsylvania =

Unincorporated community in Pennsylvania, US

Flourtown
- Census-designated place
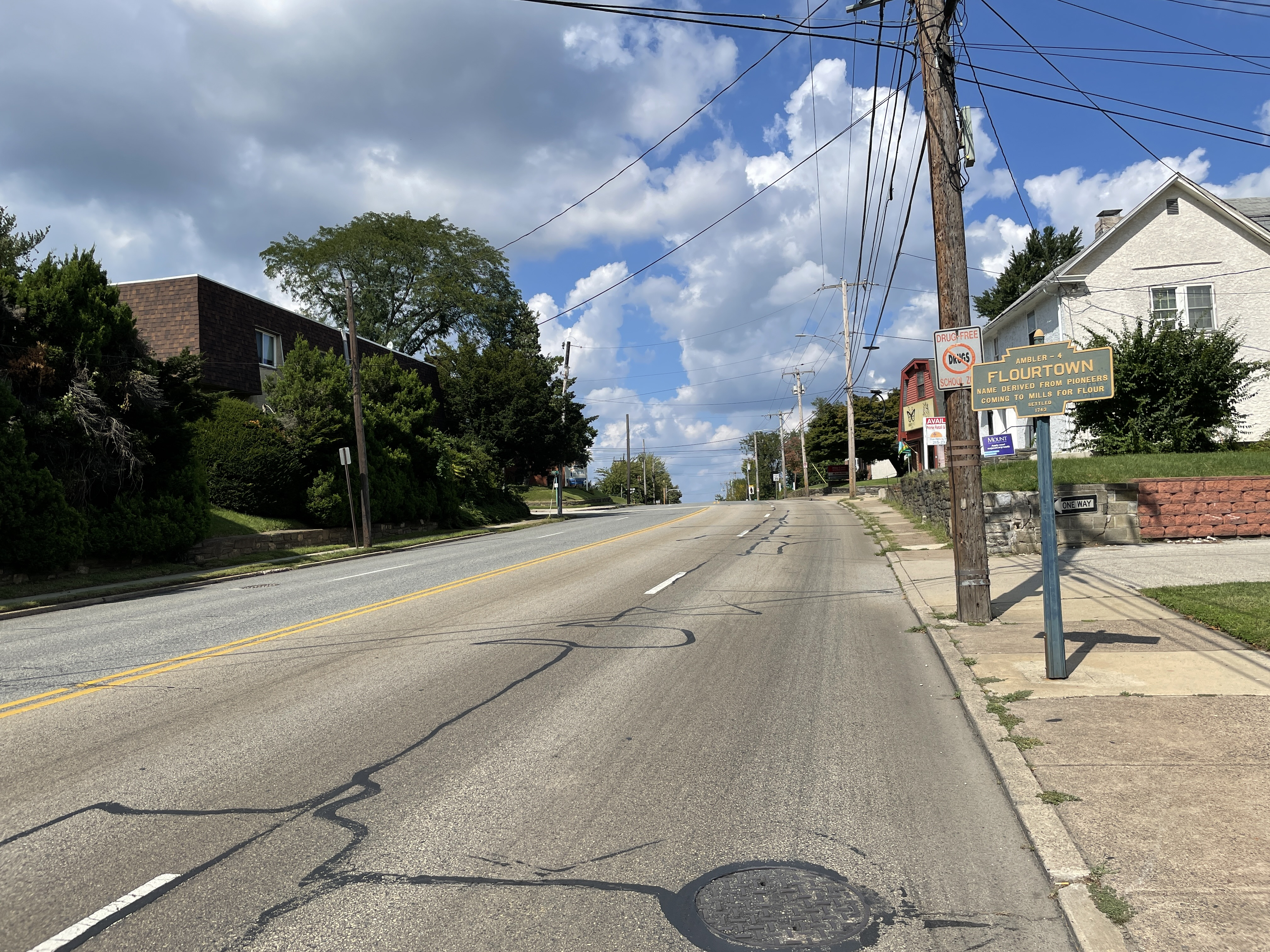
- Bethlehem Pike in Flourtown

- Location of Flourtown in Pennsylvania Flourtown (the United States)
- Coordinates: 40°06′19″N 75°12′27″W
- Country: United States
- State: Pennsylvania
- County: Montgomery
- Townships: Springfield

Area
  - Total: 1.41 sq mi (3.66 km^{2})
  - Land: 1.41 sq mi (3.66 km^{2})
  - Water: 0 sq mi (0.00 km^{2})
- Elevation: 187 ft (57 m)

Population (2020)
  - Total: 4,786
  - Density: 3,391/sq mi (1,309.3/km^{2})
- Time zone: UTC-5 (EST)
  - Summer (DST): UTC-4 (EDT)
- ZIP Code: 19031
- Area codes: 215, 267, and 445
- FIPS code: 42-26376

Flourtown is a census-designated place (CDP) in Springfield Township, Montgomery County, Pennsylvania. Flourtown is adjacent to the neighborhoods of Erdenheim, Oreland, Whitemarsh, and Chestnut Hill. The population of Flourtown was 4,538 at the 2010 census. Its ZIP code is 19031.

== History ==
Founded in 1743, the community was so named on account of a flouring mill near the original town site. In 1940, the Pennsylvania guide, compiled by the Writers' Program of the Works Progress Administration, noted that regional farmers had previously come to the area to buy supplies and "have their wheat ground by the millers along the Wissahickon. Most of the houses are old, many dating to Colonial times. Flourtown's sole commercial activity is carried on by a few antique shops."

The Black Horse Inn was listed on the National Register of Historic Places in 2005.

Scenes for the QVC Original movie Holly and the Hot Chocolate were shot in the parking lot of the Executive Motor shop and Scoogi's Italian Restaurant, both at the intersection of Bethlehem Pike and Arlingham Road.

== Geography ==
Flourtown is located at 40°6′19″N 75°12′27″W (40.105377, -75.207524). According to the U.S. Census Bureau, the CDP has a total area of 1.4 square miles (3.6 km^{2}), all land.

== Demographics ==
Historical population
Census	Pop.	Note	%±
1990	4,754		—
2000	4,669		−1.8%
2010	4,538		−2.8%
2020	4,786		5.5%

=== 2020 census ===
As of the 2020 census, Flourtown had a population of 4,786. The median age was 43.5 years. 24.3% of residents were under the age of 18 and 21.5% of residents were 65 years of age or older. For every 100 females there were 94.1 males, and for every 100 females age 18 and over there were 91.2 males age 18 and over.

100.0% of residents lived in urban areas, while 0.0% lived in rural areas.

There were 1,730 households in Flourtown, of which 36.8% had children under the age of 18 living in them. Of all households, 64.1% were married-couple households, 10.5% were households with a male householder and no spouse or partner present, and 21.7% were households with a female householder and no spouse or partner present. About 20.3% of all households were made up of individuals and 12.3% had someone living alone who was 65 years of age or older.

There were 1,790 housing units, of which 3.4% were vacant. The homeowner vacancy rate was 0.9% and the rental vacancy rate was 4.6%.

Racial composition as of the 2020 census
Race	Number	Percent
White	4,074	85.1%
Black or African American	308	6.4%
American Indian and Alaska Native	10	0.2%
Asian	112	2.3%
Native Hawaiian and Other Pacific Islander	3	0.1%
Some other race	32	0.7%
Two or more races	247	5.2%
Hispanic or Latino (of any race)	165	3.4%

=== 2010 census ===
As of the 2010 census, the CDP was 89.3% White, 5.3% Black or African American, 0.1% Native American, 2.1% Asian, 0.4% were Some Other Race, and 1.5% were two or more races. 1.8% of the population were of Hispanic or Latino ancestry.

=== 2000 census ===
As of the census of 2000, there were 4,669 people, 1,746 households, and 1,292 families living in the CDP. The population density was 3,305.0 inhabitants per square mile (1,276.1/km^{2}). There were 1,772 housing units at an average density of 1,254.3 per square mile (484.3/km^{2}). The racial makeup of the CDP was 93.72% White, 3.30% African American, 1.84% Asian, 0.32% from other races, and 0.81% from two or more races. Hispanic or Latino of any race were 0.69% of the population. 24.2% were of Irish, 14.2% Italian, 12.7% German and 11.5% English ancestry according to Census 2000.

There were 1,746 households, out of which 32.1% had children under the age of 18 living with them, 64.0% were married couples living together, 7.4% had a female householder with no husband present, and 26.0% were non-families. 22.2% of all households were made up of individuals, and 12.5% had someone living alone who was 65 years of age or older. The average household size was 2.58 and the average family size was 3.05.

In Flourtown, the population was spread out, with 23.5% under the age of 18, 4.3% from 18 to 24, 25.5% from 25 to 44, 26.0% from 45 to 64, and 20.7% who were 65 years of age or older. The median age was 43 years. For every 100 females, there were 88.8 males. For every 100 females age 18 and over, there were 82.3 males.

The median income for a household in the CDP was $76,465, and the median income for a family was $88,249. Males had a median income of $59,844 versus $42,472 for females. The per capita income for the CDP was $32,848. About 1.0% of families and 1.8% of the population were below the poverty line, including 1.0% of those under age 18 and 2.2% of those age 65 or over.

== Organizations ==
Flourtown Fire Company was established in 1910 and provides fire and emergency services to Springfield Township and the communities of Flourtown, Erdenheim, Oreland, Wyndmoor, and beyond through mutual aid agreements.

The Klingon Language Institute was founded in Flourtown in 1992.

== Education ==
Portions of Flourtown in Springfield Township are in the Springfield Township School District. Portions of Flourtown in Whitemarsh Township are in the Colonial School District.

Other institutions:

- Mount Saint Joseph Academy
- St. Genevieve's School (Catholic K-8)

== Notable people ==
- Laura Breckenridge, actress
- Matt Guokas Sr., professional basketball player and announcer and MLB announcer
- Lydie Marland (née Roberts), socialite and First Lady of Oklahoma
- Mike Richter, professional hockey player

== See also ==
- Philadelphia Cricket Club
