= Springfield Mill =

- U.S. National Register of Historic Places
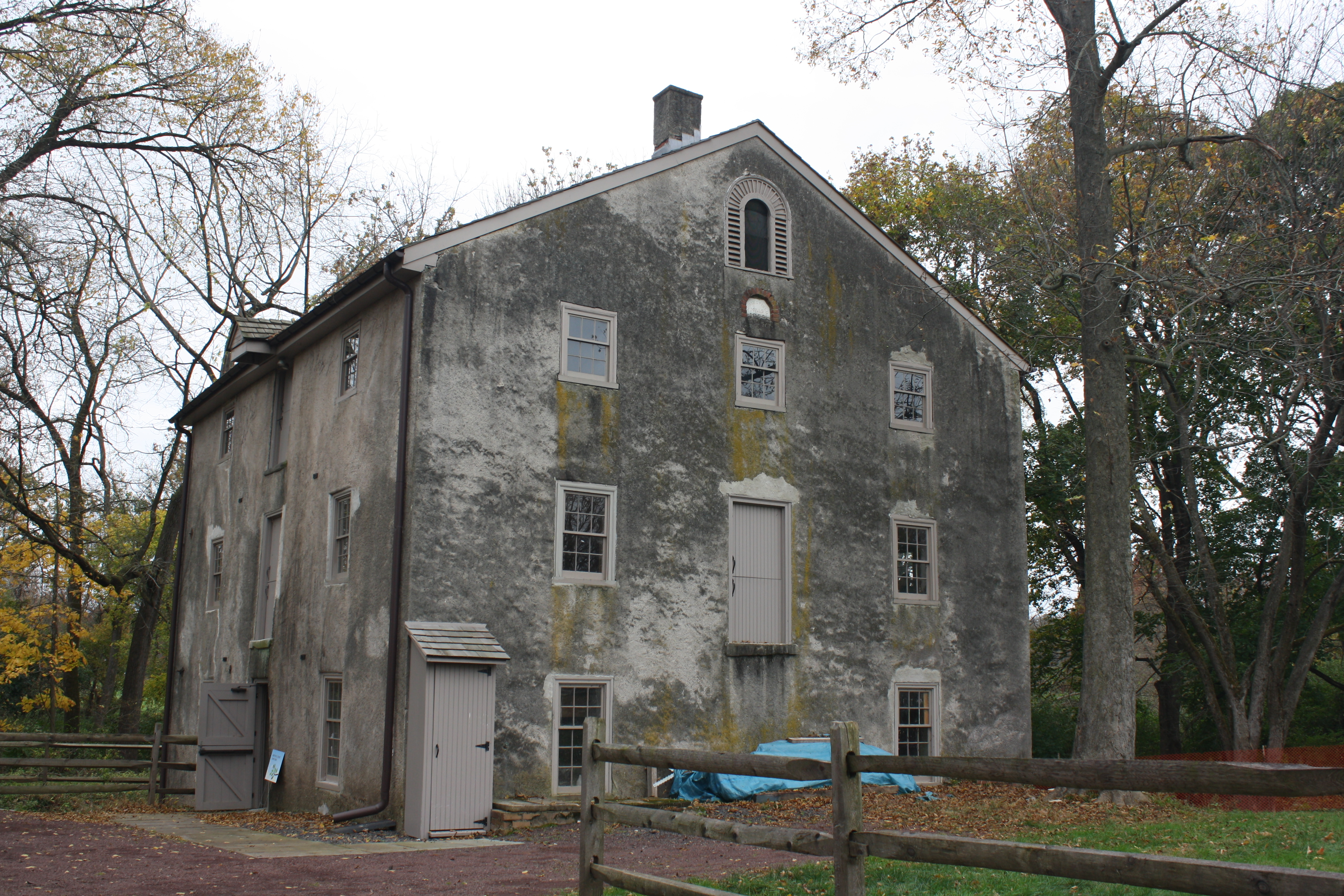

- Location within Pennsylvania Location within the United States
- Location: Northwestern Avenue, between Germantown and Stenton Avenues, Erdenheim, Pennsylvania
- Coordinates: 40°5′27″N 75°13′51″W
- Area: 5 acres (2.0 ha)
- Built: 1845, 1854
- Architectural style: Greek Revival
- NRHP reference No.: 76001652
- Added to NRHP: May 13, 1976

The Springfield Mill, also known as the Piper-Streeper Mill, is an historic, American gristmill that is located near the Wissahickon Creek in Erdenheim, Springfield Township, Montgomery County, Pennsylvania, United States.

It was added to the National Register of Historic Places in 1976.

== History and architectural features ==
Springfield Mill sits on the Bloomfield Farm tract, which is now part of the Morris Arboretum. It is open to the public once a month for grinding demonstrations.

This mill was built in 1854, and is a 3 1/2-story, stone-and-frame mill structure that measures thirty-five feet, three inches by forty feet, eight inches. The mill was built on the foundations of an earlier mill that had been erected in 1761. Also located on the property is the miller's house, a 2 1/2-story, four-bay building that was designed in the Greek Revival style and built circa 1845.

== Gallery ==
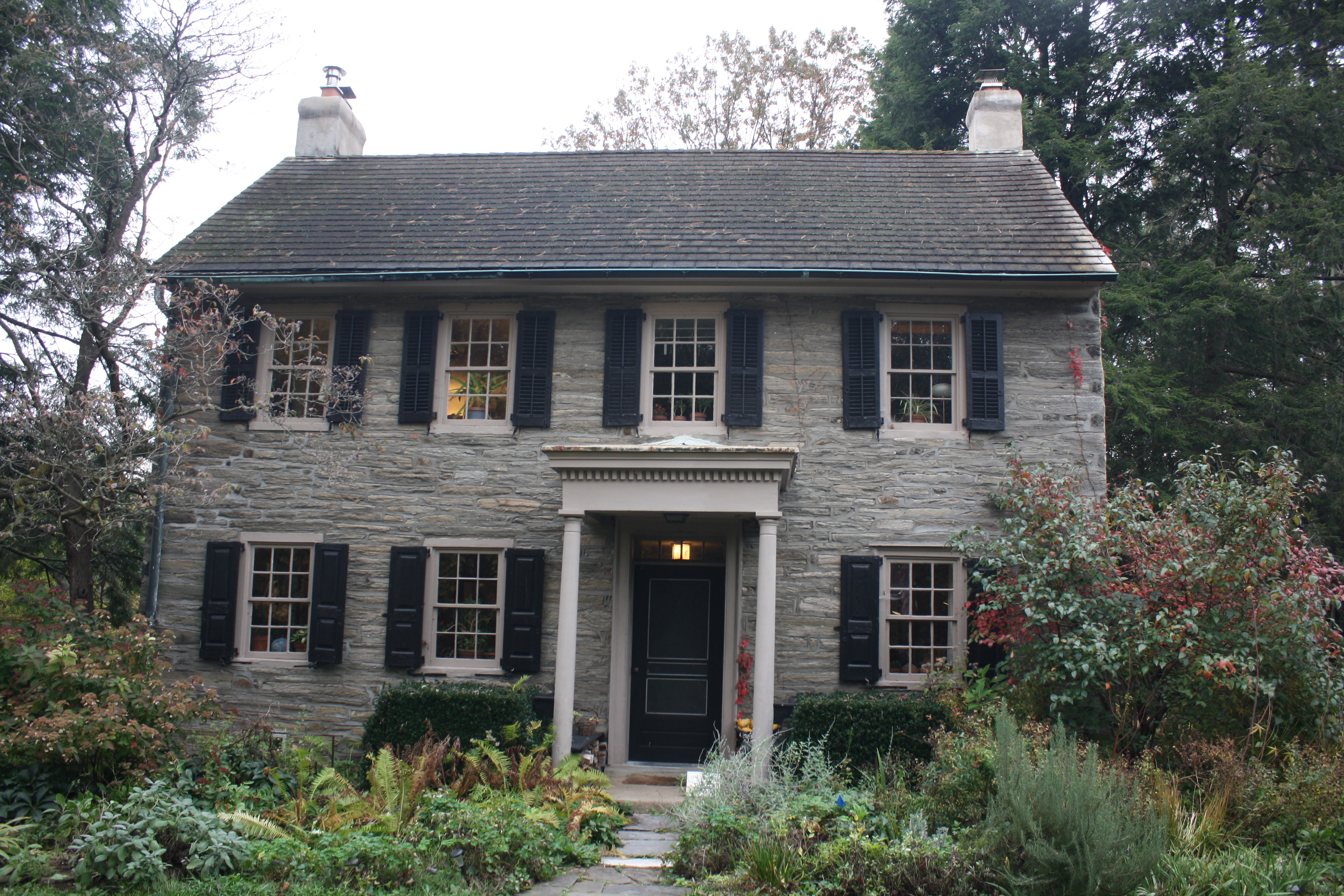
Miller's House
