= Yeakle and Miller Houses =

Historic houses in Pennsylvania, United States

- U.S. National Register of Historic Places
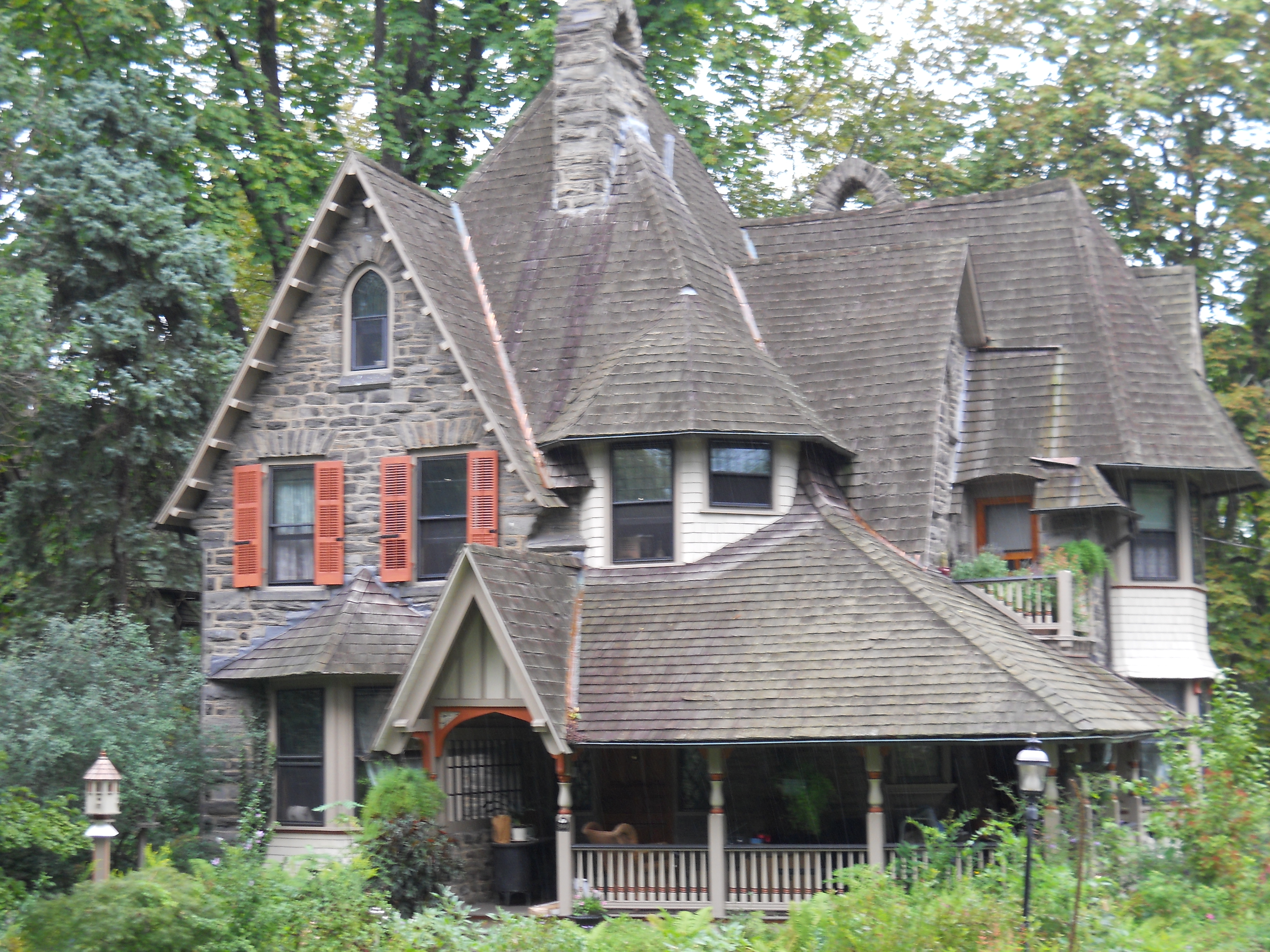
- Yeakle and Miller Houses, September 2012

- Location within Pennsylvania Location within the United States
- Location: 500 and 502 Bethlehem Pike and 9 Hillcrest Ave., Springfield Township, Erdenheim, Pennsylvania
- Coordinates: 40°5′19″N 75°12′49″W
- Area: 2 acres (0.81 ha)
- Built: 1892
- Architectural style: Queen Anne, Shingle Style
- NRHP reference No.: 91002009
- Added to NRHP: January 22, 1992

The Yeakle and Miller Houses, also known as the Daniel Yeakle and John Faber Miller Houses, are two historic, American homes that are located in Erdenheim in Springfield Township, Montgomery County, Pennsylvania.

The houses were added to the National Register of Historic Places in 1992.

== History and architectural features ==
Built in 1892, they were designed in the Queen Anne style with Shingle Style influences and were built using stone. Both have shingled hipped roofs and feature two semi-towers and porches. The Yeakle property also includes a contributing carriage house.
