= Erdenheim, Pennsylvania =

Unincorporated community in Pennsylvania, US

- Unincorporated community
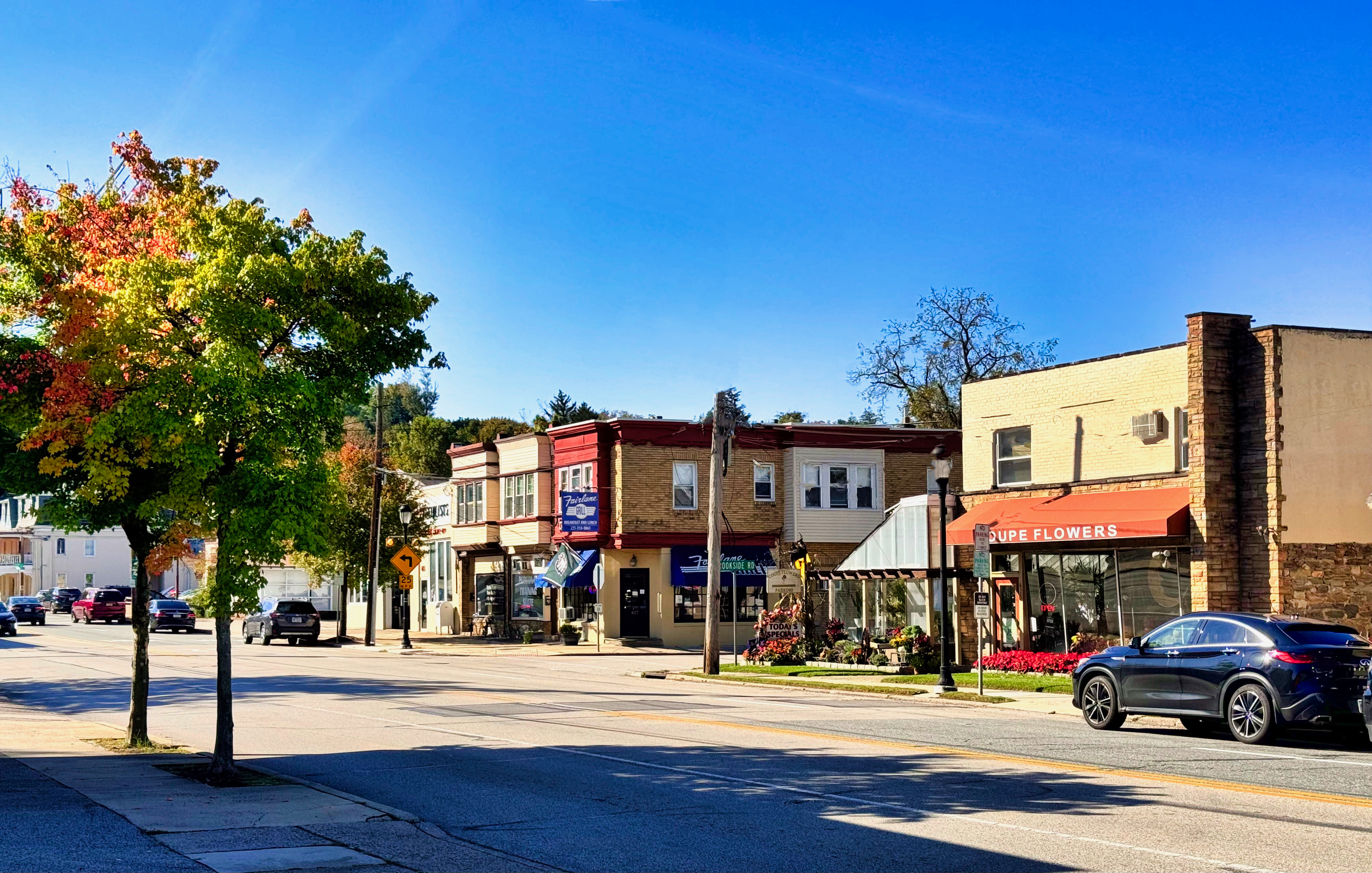
- Downtown Erdenheim

- Location within Pennsylvania
- Coordinates: 40°05′31″N 75°12′50″W
- Country: United States
- State: Pennsylvania
- County: Montgomery
- Elevation: 164 ft (50 m)
- Time zone: UTC-5 (Eastern (EST))
  - Summer (DST): UTC-4 (EDT)
- ZIP Code: 19038
- Area codes: 215, 267 and 445
- GNIS feature ID: 1174301

Erdenheim Farm in 2026

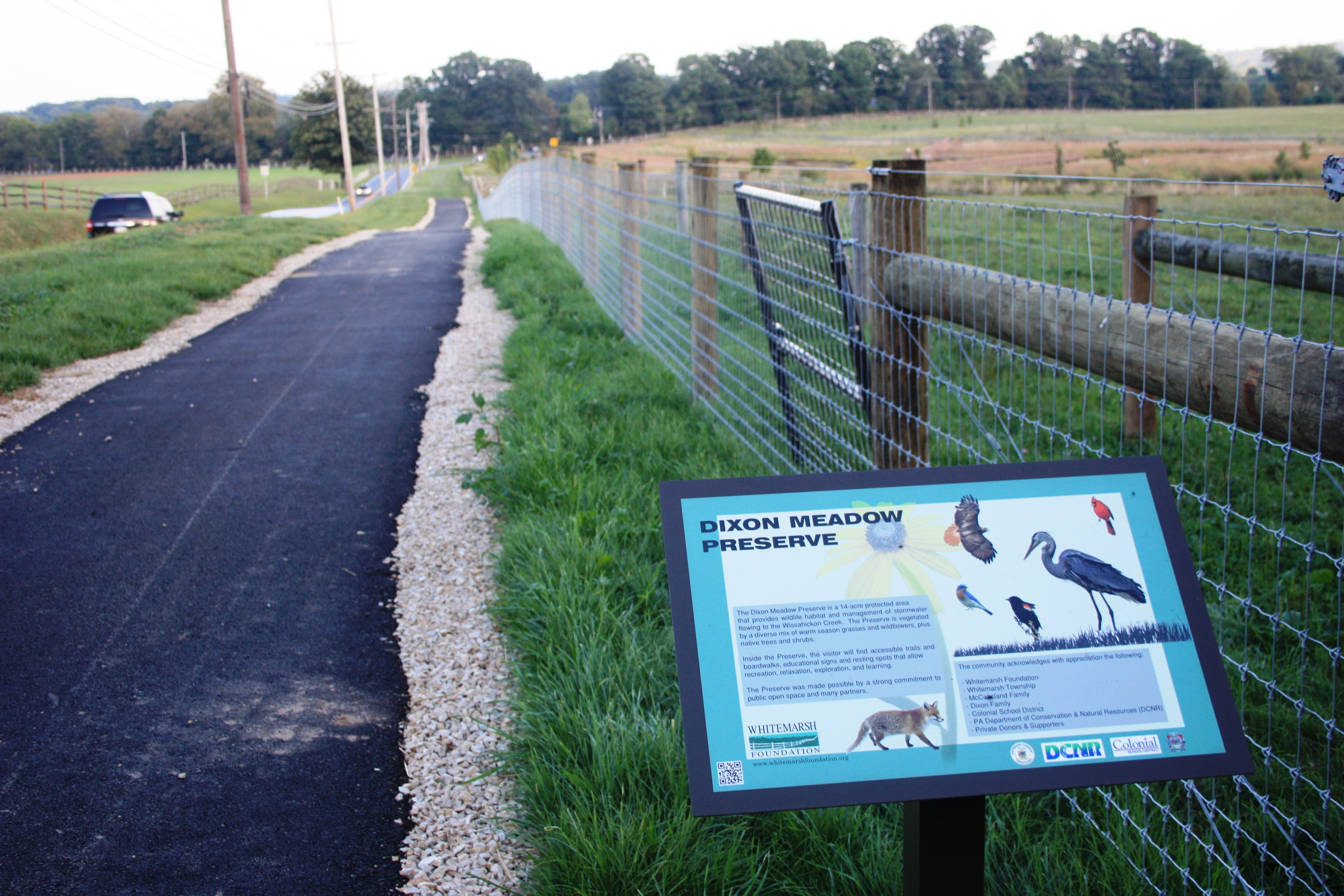
Dixon Meadow Preserve

Erdenheim is a community in Springfield Township, Montgomery County, Pennsylvania. It is served by the 19038 ZIP Code. The primary commercial areas are located along Bethlehem Pike.

The name is German for "Earthly Home," and comes from nearby Erdenheim Farm, which was established in 1765 by Johannes Georg Hocker. The area was known as "Heydricksdale" or simply "Wheelpump" after a local inn, but was changed to "Erdenheim" when the community was laid out in 1892.

Students in Erdenheim attend schools in the Springfield Township School District. Springfield Township High School is located in Erdenheim. Phil-Mont Christian Academy is a private school located adjacent to Cisco Park in the building originally housing the first Springfield Township High School, and later Hillcrest Junior High.

Cisco Park is also the site of the former Chestnut Hill Amusement Park, also known as White City (Philadelphia).

Flourtown Fire Company in neighboring Flourtown protect the citizens of the small community.

Erdenheim Terrace (near Auchy Lane and Erdenheim Road) contains some of the oldest still standing homes in the township.

Erdenheim was subject to some of the first Post-War suburban development in the Philadelphia Area, with the Chesney Downs development, located between Glendalough Road, Avondale Road, and Longfield Road being constructed in the late 1940s, while the Holiday at Paper Mill Glen development, located between Harston Lane, Fraser Road, and Atwood Road was constructed in 1955.

The Springfield Mill and Yeakle and Miller Houses are listed on the National Register of Historic Places.
