= Springfield Township School District =

School district in Pennsylvania, United States

Address
- 1901 East Paper Mill Road Oreland, Pennsylvania, 19075; United States

District information
- Type: Public
- Grades: K–12
- NCES District ID: 4222620

Students and staff
- Students: 2,555 (2020–2021)
- Teachers: 183.95 (on an FTE basis)
- Staff: 321.1 (on an FTE basis)
- Student–teacher ratio: 13.89:1

Other information
- Website: www.sdst.org

Springfield Township School District is a public school district in Montgomery County, Pennsylvania, United States.

The district serves all of Springfield Township, including Wyndmoor census-designated place, the portions of Oreland and Flourtown CDPs in Springfield Township, and Erdenheim.

== Schools ==
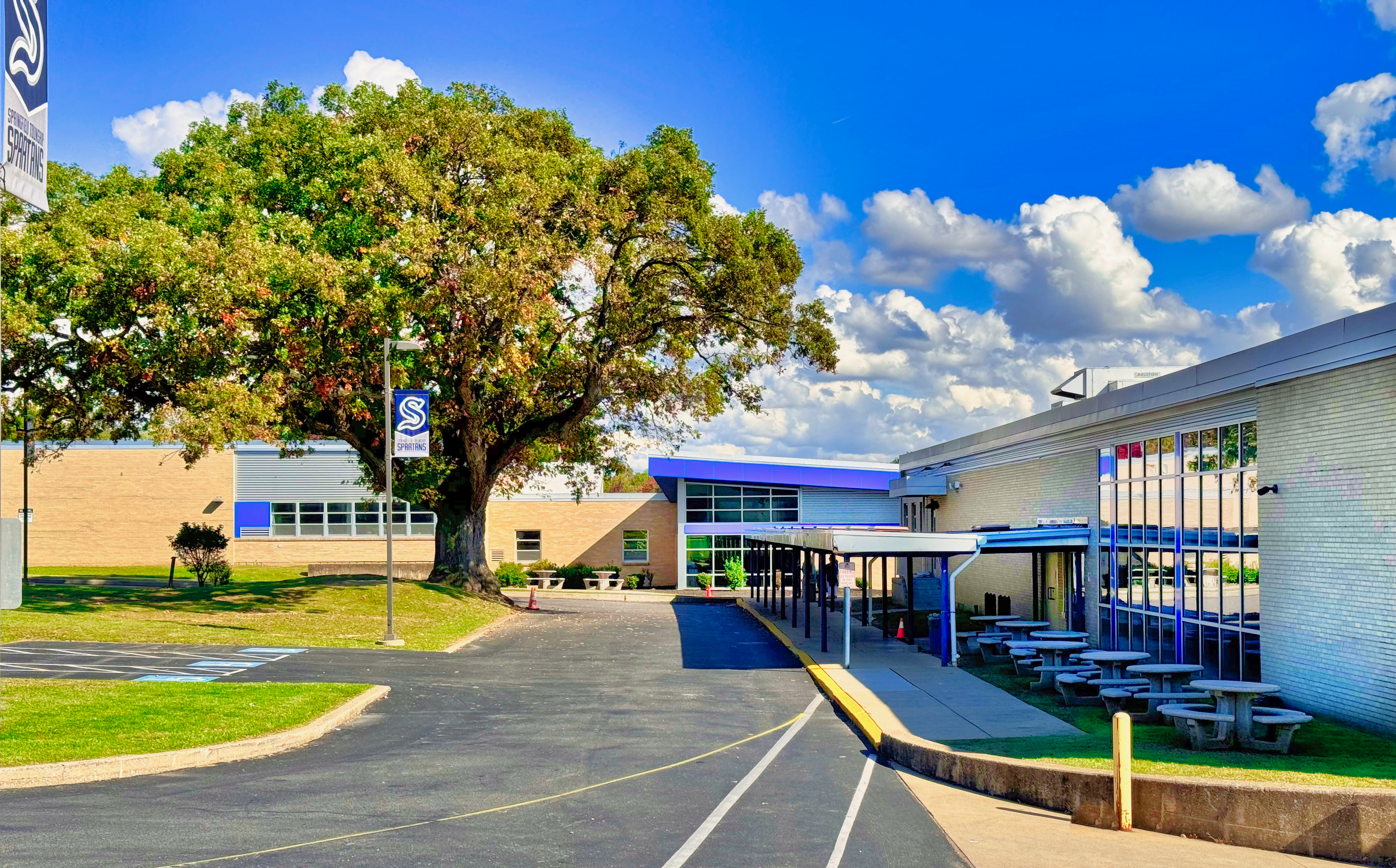
Springfield Middle School

- Springfield Elementary School, Enfield Campus (K-2)
- Springfield Elementary School, Erdenheim Campus (3-5)
- Springfield Middle School (6-8)
- Springfield Township High School (9-12)

== History ==
Springfield Township School District was the first in Pennsylvania to adopt an official stance on the issue of access to bathrooms for transgender students. In April 2016, the school board unanimously approved a policy which states that students are allowed to use the bathrooms and locker rooms corresponding to their gender identity rather than the sex stated on their birth certificate.

A new Enfield Elementary School opened in September 2021 in the same area of the former Antonelli Art Institute campus. It offers grades K-2.

== Future plans ==
Springfield Township School District will be the first school district with a fully battery powered bus in the United States.

The middle school is also currently being remodeled; it will be equipped with new geothermal heating technology.

The district is also in the process of getting more smart board technology in all classrooms, across all schools.
