= Springfield Township, Montgomery County, Pennsylvania =

Township in Pennsylvania, US

Springfield Township
- Township
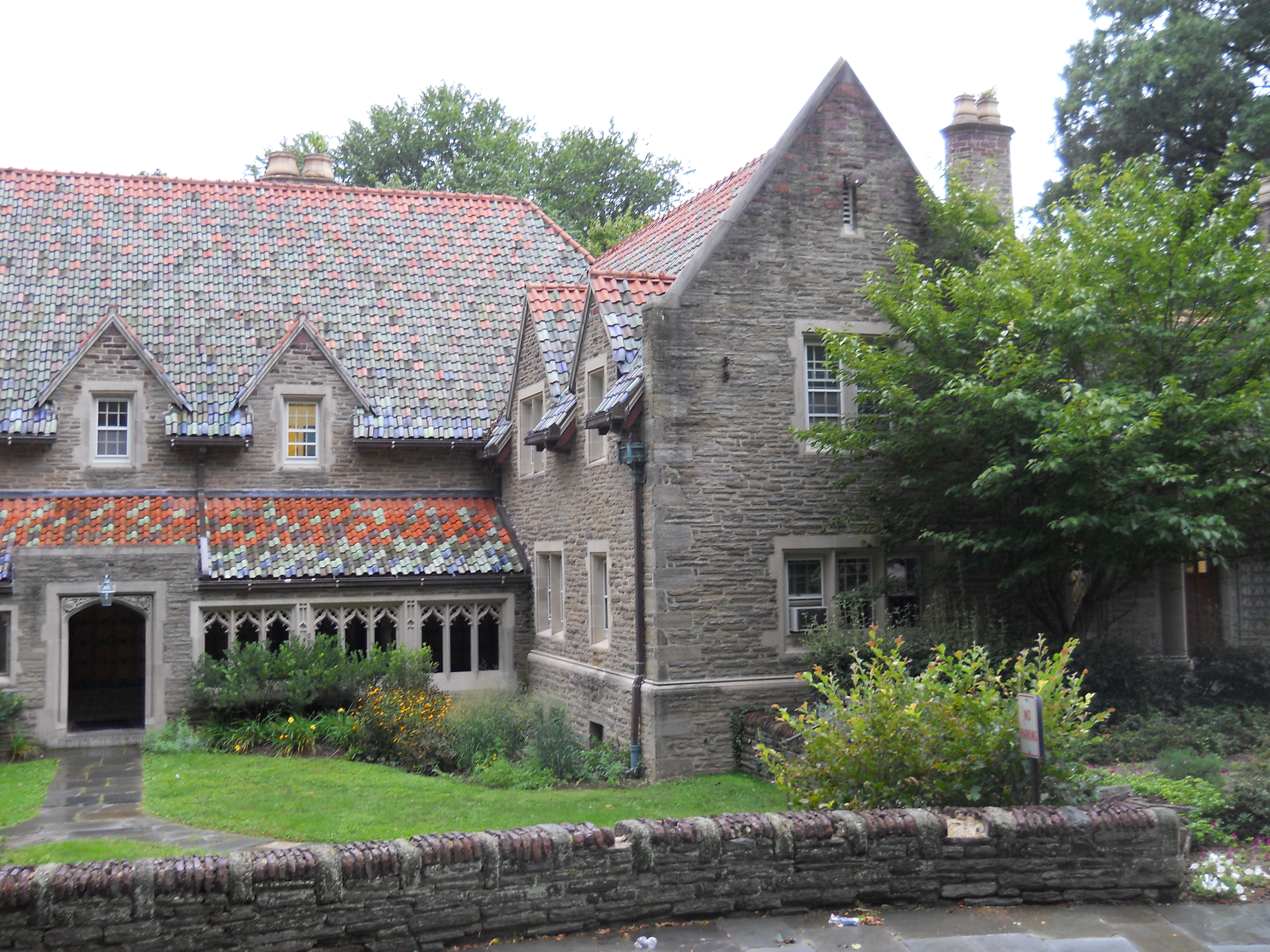
- Carson College for Orphan Girls in Flourtown

- Flag Seal

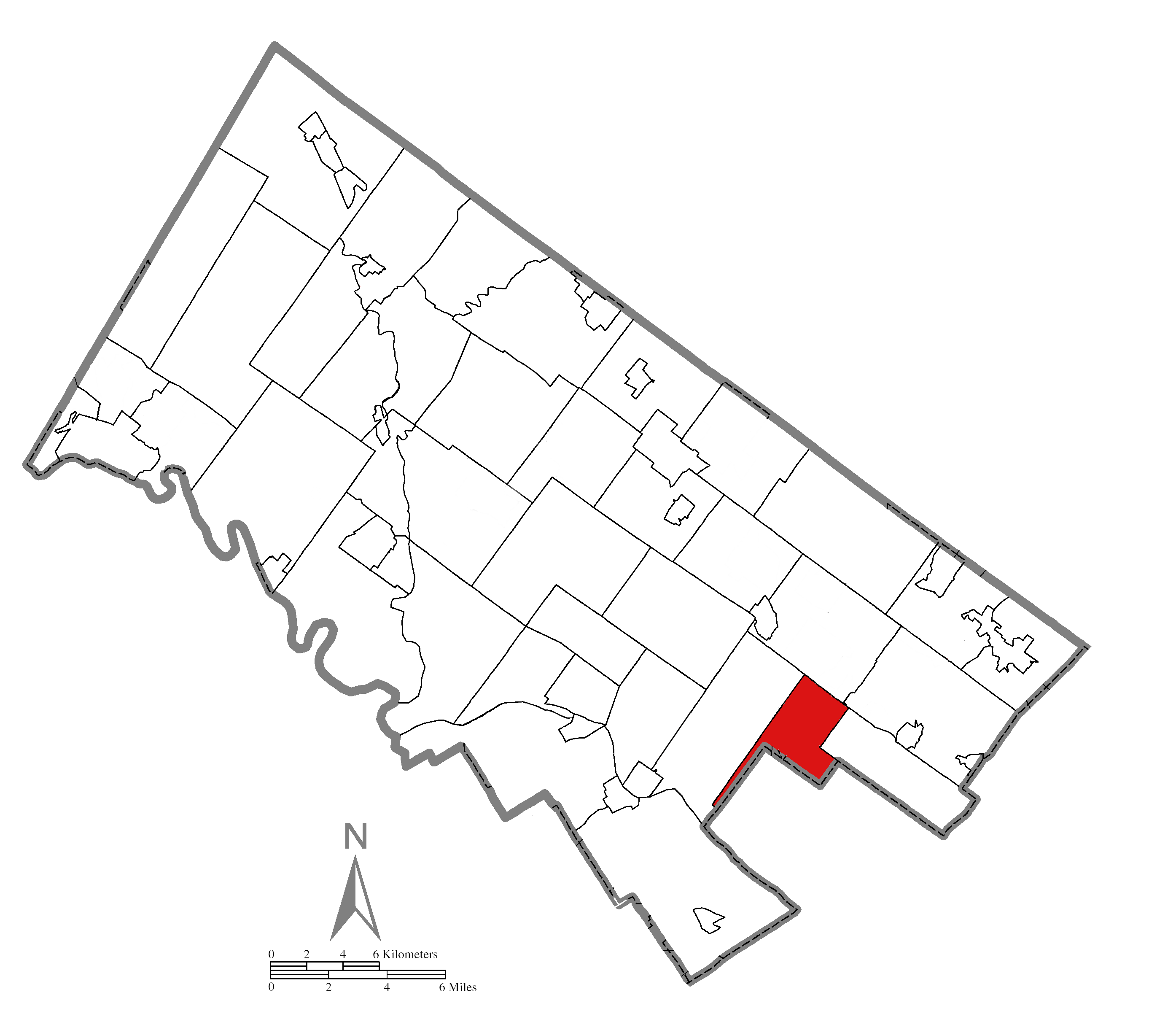
- Location of Springfield Township in Montgomery County, Pennsylvania
- Coordinates: 40°05′30″N 75°11′59″W
- Country: United States
- State: Pennsylvania
- County: Montgomery
- Established: 1681

Area
  - Total: 6.79 sq mi (17.6 km^{2})
  - Land: 6.78 sq mi (17.6 km^{2})
  - Water: 0.01 sq mi (0.026 km^{2})
- Elevation: 276 ft (84 m)

Population (2010)
  - Total: 19,418
  - Estimate (2016): 19,685
  - Density: 2,860/sq mi (1,110/km^{2})
- Time zone: UTC-5 (EST)
  - Summer (DST): UTC-4 (EDT)
- Zip code: 19031, 19034, 19038, 19075, 19444
- Area code: 215, 267, and 445
- FIPS code: 42-091-73088
- Website: www.springfieldmontco.org

Springfield Township is a township in Montgomery County, Pennsylvania. The population was 20,993 in 2022 according the Census Bureau. It includes the villages of Wyndmoor, Erdenheim, Flourtown, and Oreland. The communities of Lafayette Hill, Fort Washington, Laverock, North Hills, Miquon, and Glenside are also situated partly inside the Township.

== History ==
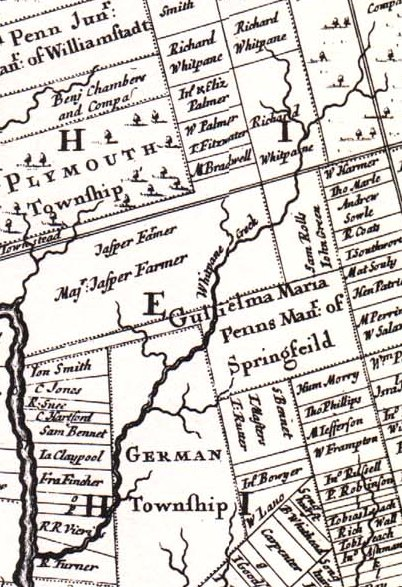
Thomas Holme's 1687 map of Pennsylvania, including Gulielma Maria Penns Manor in Springfield

Four locations in Springfield Township, Black Horse Inn, Carson College for Orphan Girls, Springfield Mill, and Yeakle and Miller Houses, are listed on the National Register of Historic Places.

== Geography ==
According to the U.S. Census Bureau, the township has a total area of 6.8 square miles (17.6 km^{2}), of which 6.8 square miles (17.6 km^{2}) is land and 0.15% is water.

The township is bordered in Montgomery County by (clockwise from west) Whitemarsh Township to the west, Upper Dublin Township to the north, shares a corner with Abington Township to the northeast, and Cheltenham Township to the east. In Philadelphia, it is adjacent to Cedarbrook to the southeast (along Ivy Hill Rd.), shares a corner with East Mount Airy to the south (Stenton and Ivy Hill), and Chestnut Hill to the southwest (along Stenton Ave.)

== Transportation ==
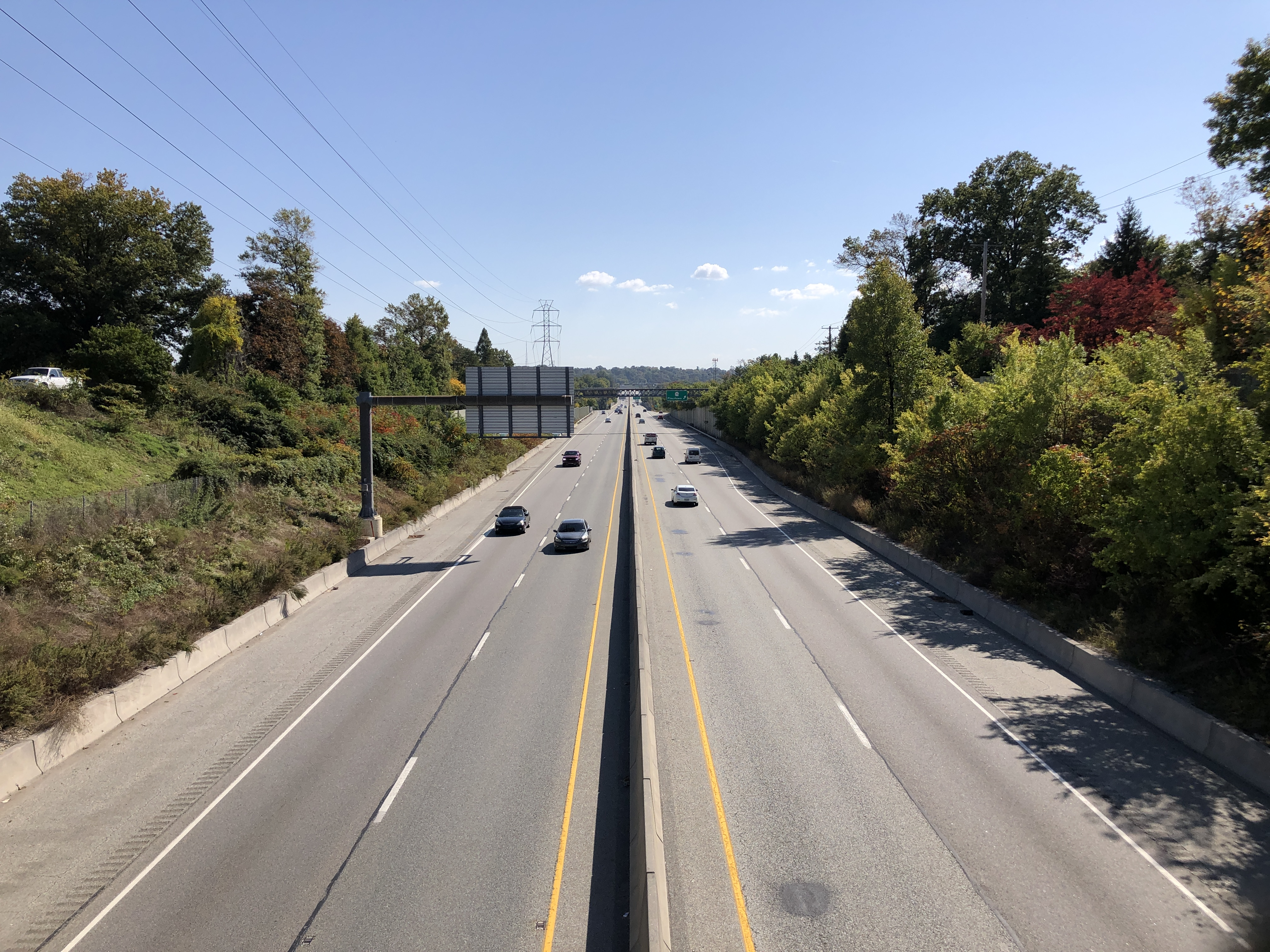
PA 309 southbound in Springfield Township

As of 2018 there were 79.20 miles (127.46 km) of public roads in Springfield Township, of which 13.91 miles (22.39 km) were maintained by the Pennsylvania Department of Transportation (PennDOT) and 65.29 miles (105.07 km) were maintained by the township.

The main highways serving Springfield Township are Pennsylvania Route 73 and Pennsylvania Route 309. PA 73 follows Church Road along a southeast-northwest alignment through the middle of the township. PA 309 follows the Fort Washington Expressway along a similar alignment, though they do intersect at an interchange near the northern edge of the township.

SEPTA Regional Rail's Lansdale/Doylestown Line passes through the northern edge of Springfield Township. Oreland station is located in the township, and the North Hills station is located just outside it in Abington Township. SEPTA provides bus service to Springfield Township along City Bus routes 27, 51, and 77 and Suburban Bus routes 94, 95, and 97, serving points of interest in the township and offering connections to Philadelphia and other suburbs.

== Demographics ==
Historical population
Census	Pop.	Note	%±
1930	5,541		—
1940	5,603		1.1%
1950	11,403		103.5%
1960	20,652		81.1%
1970	22,394		8.4%
1980	20,344		−9.2%
1990	19,612		−3.6%
2000	19,533		−0.4%
2010	19,418		−0.6%
2020	20,814		7.2%

As of 2021, there were 20,590 people in the township. The population density was 3,060 people per square mile. There were 7,982 housing units. The racial makeup of the township was 81% White, 9% African American, 2% Asian, and 3% from two or more races. Hispanic or Latino of any race were 4%. The foreign born population was 5.5%, with 8.5% of households speaking a language other than English at home.

There were 7,760 households, 68% were married couples living together, 11% had a female householder with no husband present, 4% a male householder with no wife present, and 16% were non-families. The average household size was 2.52. Of the 7,982 housing units, 79% were owner-occupied and 21% rented. Single units account for 82% of all housing, multi-units 18%, and there were no mobile homes.

Springfield's median age was 44.9. The age distribution was 21.4% under the age of 18, 4.7% from 18 to 24, 25.8% from 25 to 44, 24.8% from 45 to 64, and 23.3% 65 or older. The median age was 44 under the age of 18, 57% 18-64, and 21% 65 and over.

The median household income was $109,025 and the per capita income for the township was $57,230. Twenty percent of household made more than $200,000 per year. The overall poverty rate was 3.9%, with 2% of children under 18 living in poverty and 9% of those 65 or over.

== Education ==
- Springfield Township School District serves the township. It operates Springfield Township High School, Springfield Township Middle School, Enfield Elementary School, and Erdenheim Elementary School. Four Catholic schools are located in the township: Mount Saint Joseph Academy (girls' high school), Martin Saints Classical High School, La Salle College High School (boys' high school) and St. Genevieve's School (K-8). The township is also served by the Free Library of Springfield Township.

== Politics and government ==
Presidential elections results
Year	Republican	Democratic
2020	27.2% 3,820	71.4% 10,027
2016	27.4% 3,386	68.2% 8,430
2012	35.3% 4,194	63.8% 7,588
2008	33.8% 4,141	65.4% 8,009
2004	38.4% 4,614	61.3% 7,364
2000	40.5% 4,358	56.7% 6,109
1996	39.8% 4,128	51.8% 5,369
1992	39.5% 4,454	46.1% 5,197

Springfield Township has a township-manager form of government and is governed by a seven-member board of commissioners, who are elected for four year terms. The commissioners are elected in odd-numbered years, with half being elected every two years. Odd-numbered districts are elected in one election cycle, and even-numbered districts in the next (i.e. 2025). The township is divided into seven wards, each with one commissioner. All wards have two precincts with the exception of Ward 2, which has three.

Springfield Township School District's boundaries are coterminous with the township's. The school district is composed of nine elected members, each elected for four years.

The township is part of State House District 154, represented by Rep. Napoleon Nelson, and State Senate District 4, represented by Art Haywood.

The township is covered by the 4th congressional district, represented by Rep. Madeleine Dean.

== Notable residents ==
- Frank Cassidy, former U.S. Federal Housing Commissioner and Assistant Secretary for Housing
- Jim Cramer, CNBC television host

== See also ==
- Erdenheim Farm
- Whitemarsh Hall

Preceded by Whitemarsh Township	Bordering communities of Philadelphia	Succeeded by Cheltenham
