= Black Horse Inn =

- U.S. National Register of Historic Places
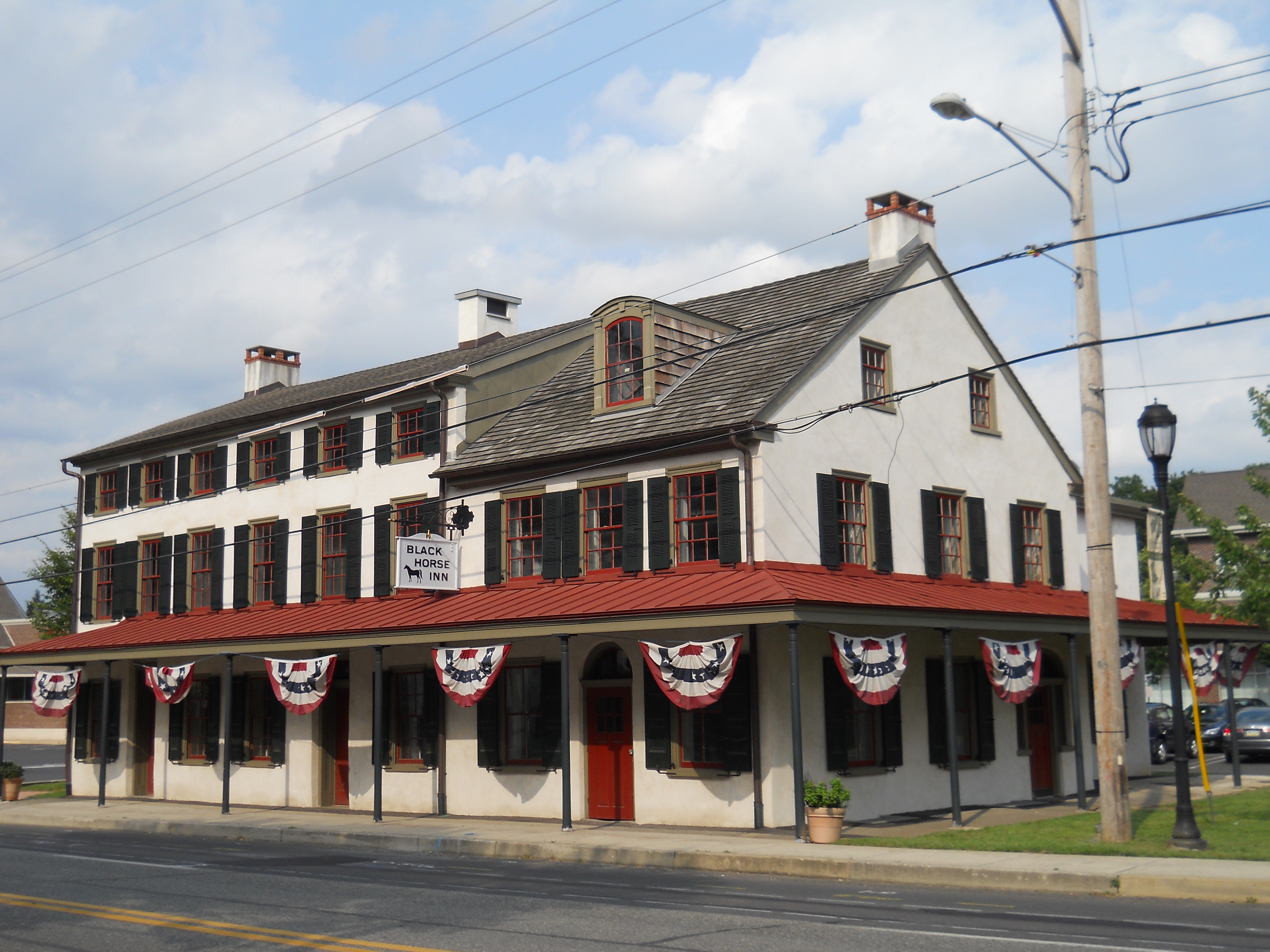
- Black Horse Inn, September 2012

- Location within Pennsylvania Location within the United States
- Location: 1432 Bethlehem Pike, Flourtown, Springfield Township, Pennsylvania
- Coordinates: 40°6′13″N 75°12′48″W
- Area: 2 acres (0.81 ha)
- Architectural style: Federal
- NRHP reference No.: 89000144
- Added to NRHP: July 5, 2005

Black Horse Inn, also known as Sampson & the Lion, is a historic inn and tavern located in Flourtown in Springfield Township, Montgomery County, Pennsylvania. The original section was built in 1744 and is a 2 1/2-story stuccoed stone structure with a one-story, stone kitchen addition in the rear. The original section measures 16 feet by 18 feet, and the kitchen addition 15 feet by 15 feet.

In 1833, a three-story addition was made to the north and between 1880 and 1908, three one-story additions were made to the rear. Also in 1833, a one-story porch was added to the front, west, and south sides. The building is in the Federal style.

It was listed on the National Register of Historic Places in 2005.
