= Springfield Township High School =

Coordinates: 40.1029°N 75.1969°W

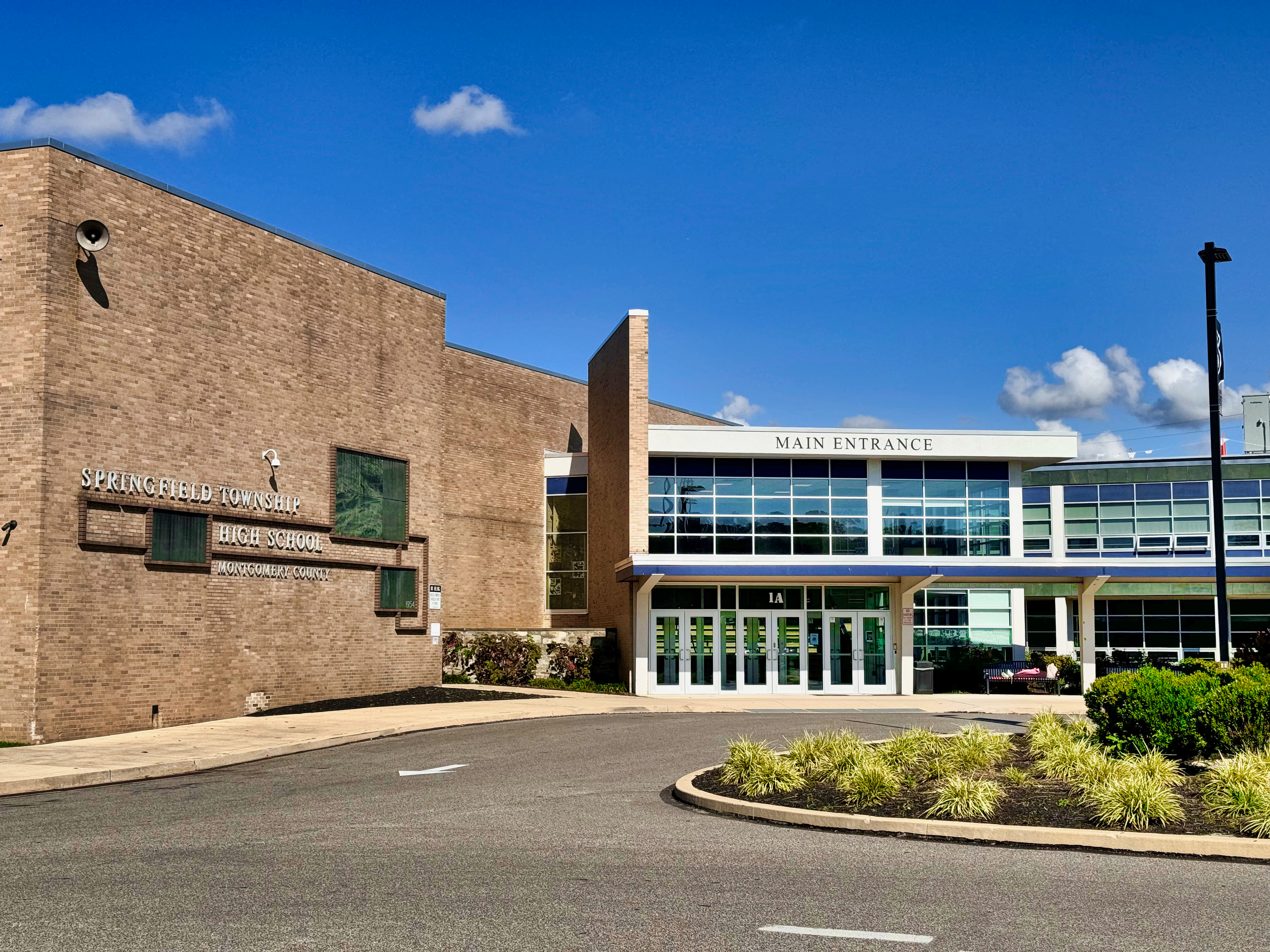

Location
- 1801 E. Paper Mill Road; Erdenheim, Pennsylvania 19038; United States

Information
- School type: Public high school
- Established: 1924
- School district: Springfield Township School District
- Principal: Charles E. Rittenhouse
- Teaching staff: 58.51 (FTE)
- Grades: 9-12
- Enrollment: 770 (2023–2024)
- Student to teacher ratio: 13.16
- Campus type: Suburban
- Colors: Blue and Steel
- Mascot: Spartan
- Publication: The Chronicle
- Yearbook: Retina
- Information: 215-233-6030
- Website: https://www.sdst.org/schools/high-school/index

Springfield Township High School (commonly STHS) is a public high school serving grades 9-12. The school serves Springfield Township, Pennsylvania, and is the sole high school of the Springfield Township School District.

== History ==
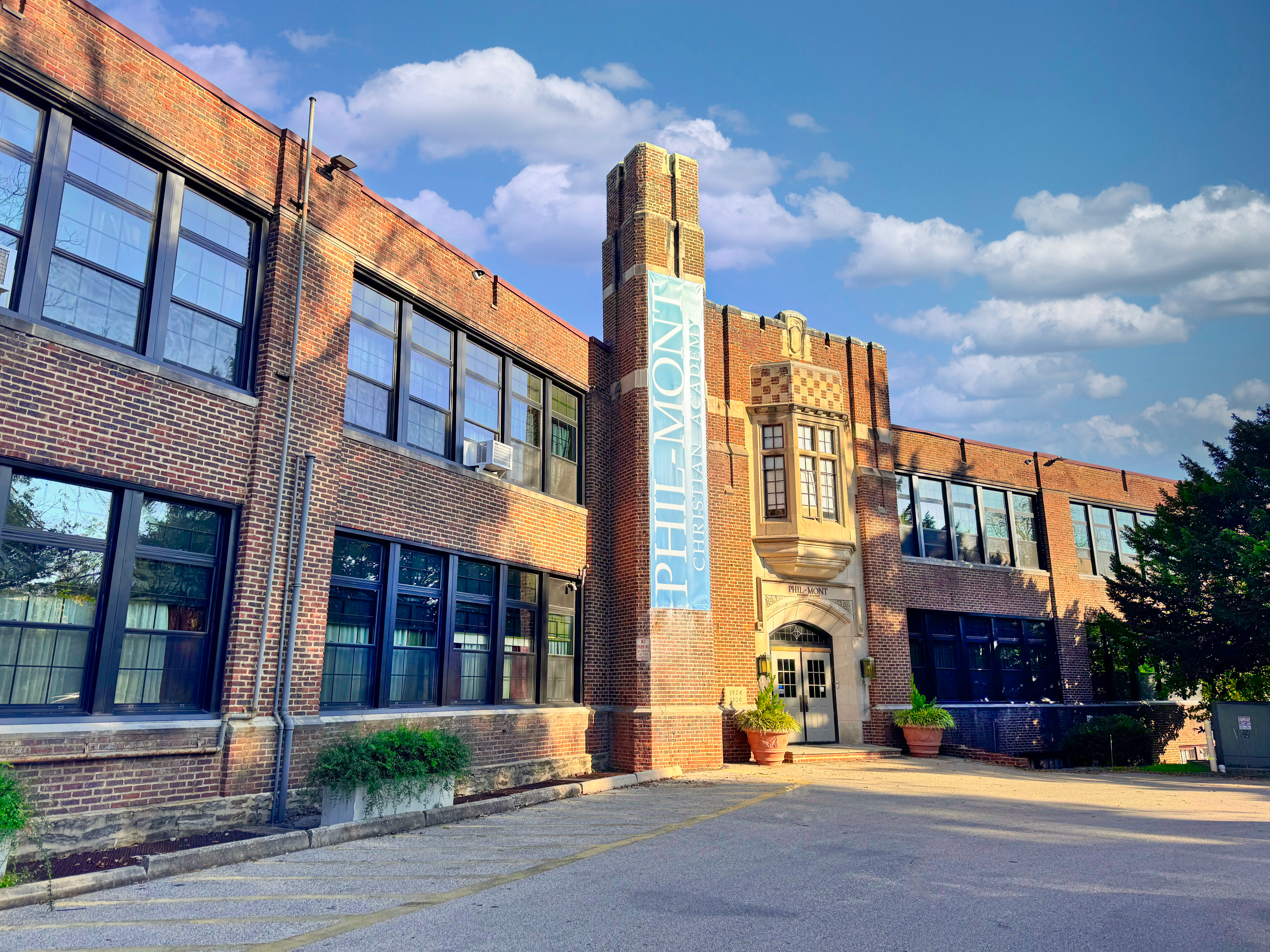
The former Springfield Township Senior High School building is now Phil-Mont Christian Academy

In 1922, Springfield Township planned to construct a high school to serve area students in grades 7-11. The original 12-classroom school was completed in 1924, built at Hillcrest Pond, the former site of White City amusement park.

Six more classrooms, a library, a new cafeteria, and administration offices were added in 1930. A new gym was completed 1939. Another wing of classrooms was added in 1948. Despite constant expansion, the growing township demanded a bigger high school campus and the current campus, located at 1801 Paper Mill Rd., was built in 1954 to house grades 9-12. The junior and senior high school students were split and after STHS moved out, the old campus served as Hillcrest Junior High for grades 7-8. It is now home to Philadelphia-Montgomery Christian Academy.

After the new high school was built, students from surrounding townships that had yet to establish school districts would also attend Springfield, with class size swelling to upwards of 300 students in the 1960s. A wing with ten more classrooms was added in 1961. In 1963 the maintenance area was converted into a faculty room and three additional classrooms. A major expansion in 1968 added a natatorium and new gymnasium. The former gymnasium became the new library. The old library was turned into additional science classrooms, and the school offices were expanded.

The high school went under extensive renovation starting in 1999, which also included the renovation of Spartan Stadium, and the construction of a field house. In 1995, to ease crowding in the elementary schools, 8th grade was moved to the high school. On October 20, 2009 the School Board approved a restructuring plan that relocated 8th grade to the middle school leaving grades 9-12 in the high school. (Note: Meeting Minutes) This move became effective for the 2010-2011 school year. In 2019 a new auxiliary gym was built in addition to the renovated athletic complex.

== Academics ==
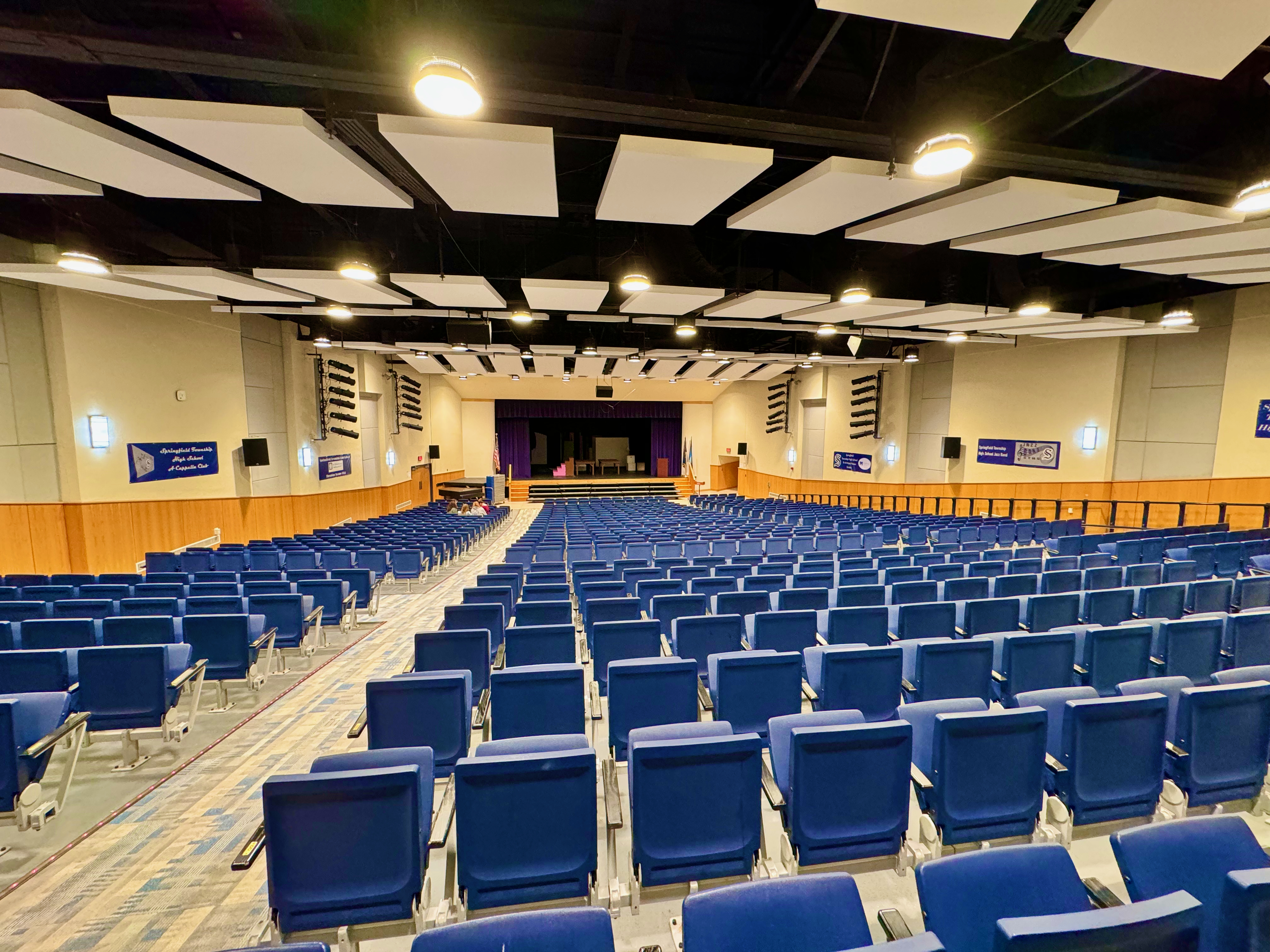
The Springfield Township High School auditorium

The school offers fourteen Advanced Placement exams and the opportunity to earn college credit from Penn State University and Montgomery County Community College.

The students take three or four 90 minutes classes in the school's intensive block scheduling program.

The school's library has received several awards, including best high school library website.

Springfield Township High School has also been a pioneer in developing a national computer science curriculum for high school students. The school took part in the creation of the AP Computer Science Principles program, as well as maintaining a computer science graduation requirement for all students.

In 2009, 93% of the graduating students continued on the higher education, 77% to four-year programs and 16% to two-year programs. Springfield students averaged a 1628 on the SAT I (out of a possible 2400), and outscored the national average by more than 20 points in each of the three sections. (Note: Springfield students outscored the National Average by 24 points in Mathematics, 47 in Writing, and 48 in Critical Reading.)

== Athletics ==
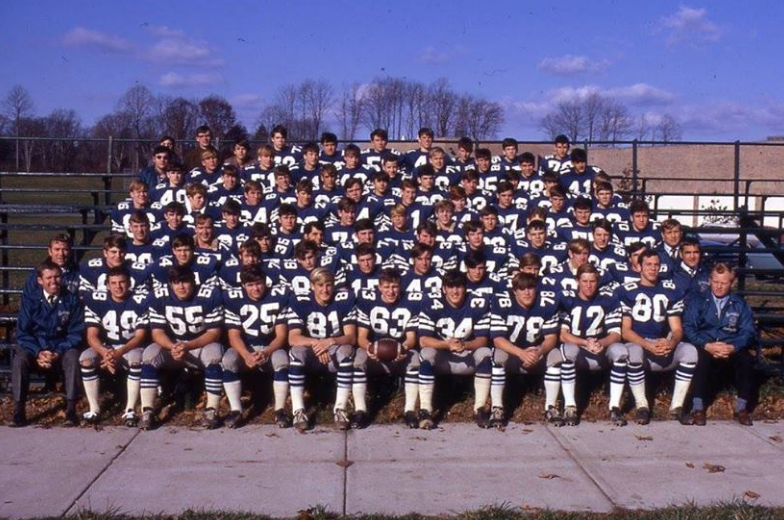
Undefeated 1970 Suburban One Champions

Springfield Township High School is a AA member of the PIAA District One. The school has also been a member of the Suburban One League since 1969, participating in the American Conference. From 1925 to 1969, Springfield played in the Bux-Mont league. Springfield briefly left Suburban One in the 2010-2011 school year for the Bicentennial League, but returned to Suburban One for the 2012-2013 school year.

In 1969, the football team won the Bux-Mont League title. In 1970, The Spartan Football Team was undefeated champions of the Suburban One League.

In 2022, the wrestling team had a historic season, finishing 4-0 in suburban one league, winning the league championship during senior night against Upper Moreland, winning its first league championship in the programs history.

Championships since 1986
| Sport | Year |
|---|---|
| Baseball | 1997 |
| Cross Country (M) | 2008 |
| Football | 1995 |
| Tennis (M) | 1997 |
| Track & Field (M) | 2002 |
| Field Hockey | 1991, 1992, 1998, 1999, 2002, 2004, 2007 |
| Basketball (W) | 1992 |
| Lacrosse (W) | 1993, 2002, 2003, 2005 |
| Track & Field (W) | 1999 |
| Golf | 1988, 1990, 1991, 1992, 1998, 2000 |
| Softball | 1991, 1992, 1993, 1994, 1998, 1999 |
| Swimming (M) | 2009, 2010, 2011 |
| Wrestling | 2022 |

Springfield also has five individual state championships. 1992 Men's 100 yard breaststroke, 1999 state cross country, 2000 state tennis singles, and 2011 state 3200 meters, 2021 Women's 100 butterfly And freestyle. In 2021 the men’s and women’s water polo teams won the small school state championship.

== Notable alumni ==
- Ray Benson (formerly Ray Seifert) - Musician, Asleep at the Wheel
- Jim Cramer - Investor / Host of CNBC's Mad Money
- David Kestenbaum - NPR host, contributor, producer - Planet Money, science correspondent, This American Life
- Martin Nisenholtz - Businessman and educator
- Lucky Oceans (formerly Rueben Gosfield) - Musician, Asleep at the Wheel
- Craig Shoemaker - Actor and comedian
- Ben Waxman - Politician, Pennsylvania House of Representatives
