= James Morris (Pennsylvania politician) =

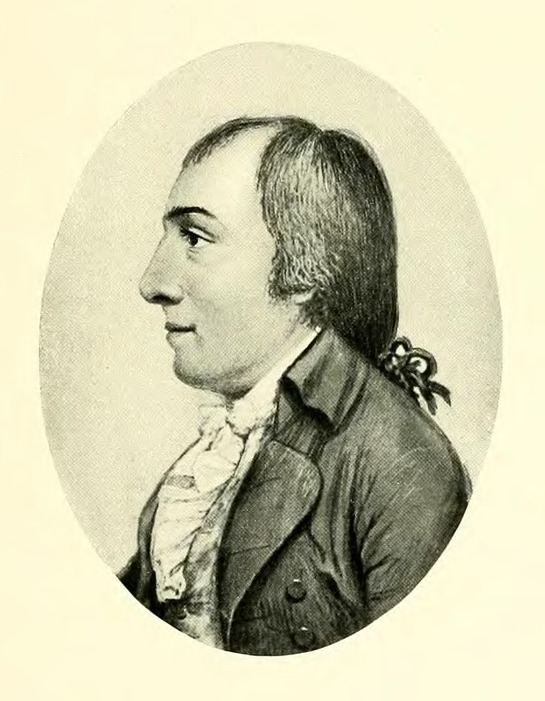
- Born: 1753
- Died: 10 July 1795
- Father: Joseph Morris

James Morris (1753 – July 10, 1795) was a Pennsylvania politician, judge and Revolutionary War soldier.

== Early life and education ==
Morris was born in Whitpain Township, Pennsylvania in 1753. His family had emigrated from England and his grandfather had purchased land in the area in 1713. His father was a merchant on Front Street in Philadelphia. Morris married Elizabeth Dawes in 1772 and they had a daughter, Hannah, one year later. In 1776, they had a son Joseph.

== Career ==
Though he was a Quaker, he joined the American army during the Revolution. He was commissioned a 3rd Lieutenant in the Pennsylvania Regiment of Artillery on April 1, 1777. Shortly thereafter his father-in-law's home Dawesfield where Morris had moved to, became George Washington's headquarters.

After the war, Morris stayed in the military but also pursued public service. He served in the Pennsylvania General Assembly from 1782 to 1784. He then became Justice of the Peace for Whitpain, Norristown and Worcester Townships and an associate judge of the county courts before being promoted to president judge on July 25, 1785, serving until 1790. During the same period he served as a captain of the Montgomery County Troop of Light Horse. In 1789–1790 he attended the convention to write a new constitution for Pennsylvania. The new constitution called for judges to be learned in the law, which did not include Morris, ending his service. He was then appointed register of wills and recorder of deeds in 1791. In 1792 he was a presidential elector, casting his vote for his friend George Washington. In 1793 he was promoted to brigadier general of the Montgomery County militia and in 1794 he participated, with his son, in the campaign against the Whiskey Rebellion in western Pennsylvania.

In 1794 he ran for Congress and at first he was declared the winner of the district's 2nd seat by 13 votes. His opponent, John Richards, contested the election as many votes sent by soldiers involved in the Whiskey Rebellion were late and the seat was left vacant because the Governor refused to certify the returns. On July 10, 1795, before the contest could be decided, Morris died. Congress subsequently decided the contest in Richards' favor deciding that some late votes should be counted and that other even later ones should not.

Morris was buried in the burial ground at Plymouth Meeting.
