= Whitemarsh Township, Pennsylvania =

Township in Pennsylvania, US

Whitemarsh Township
- Home-rule township
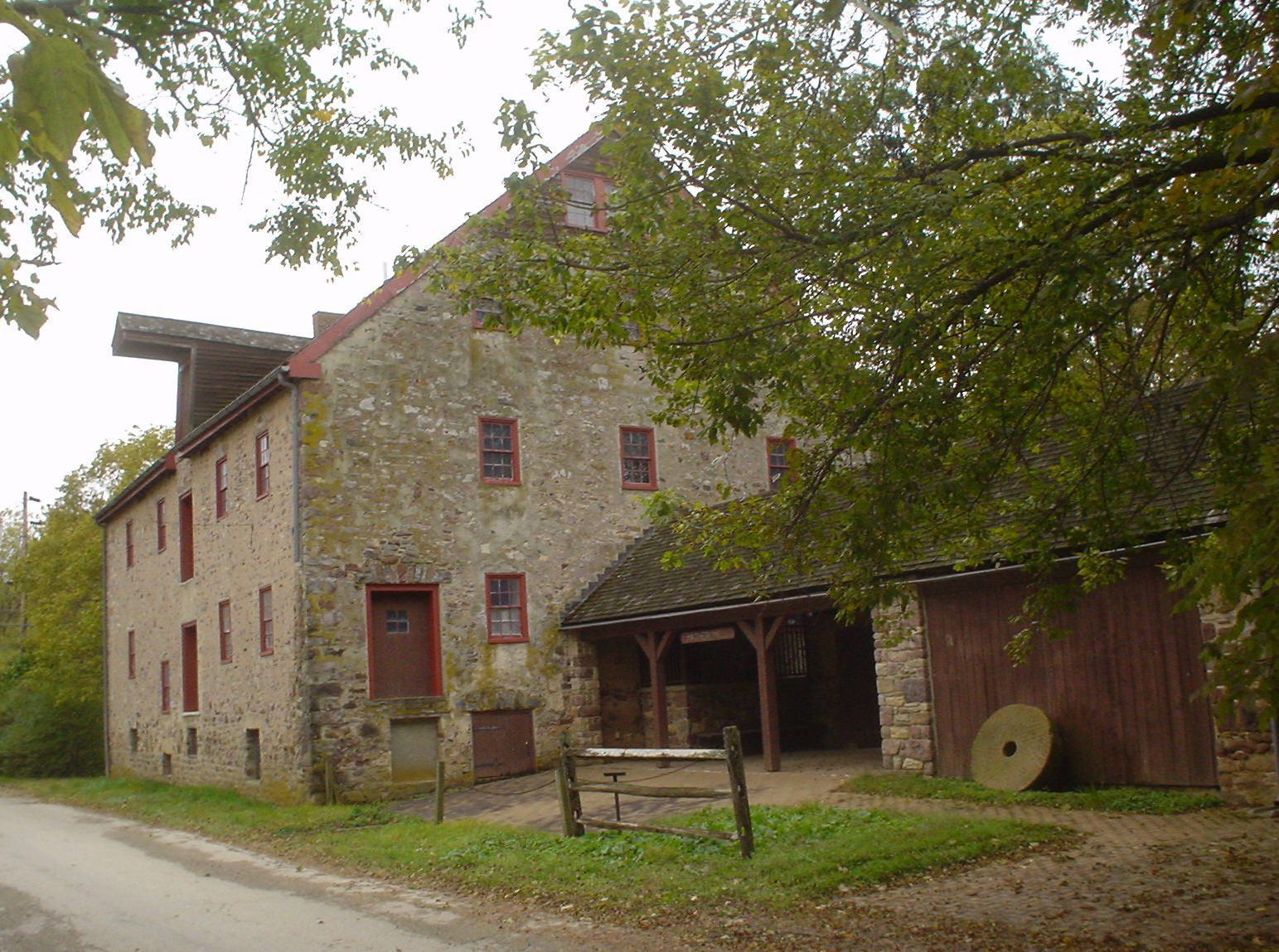
- Farmar Mill in Whitemarsh Township, built c. 1690

- Flag Seal Logo

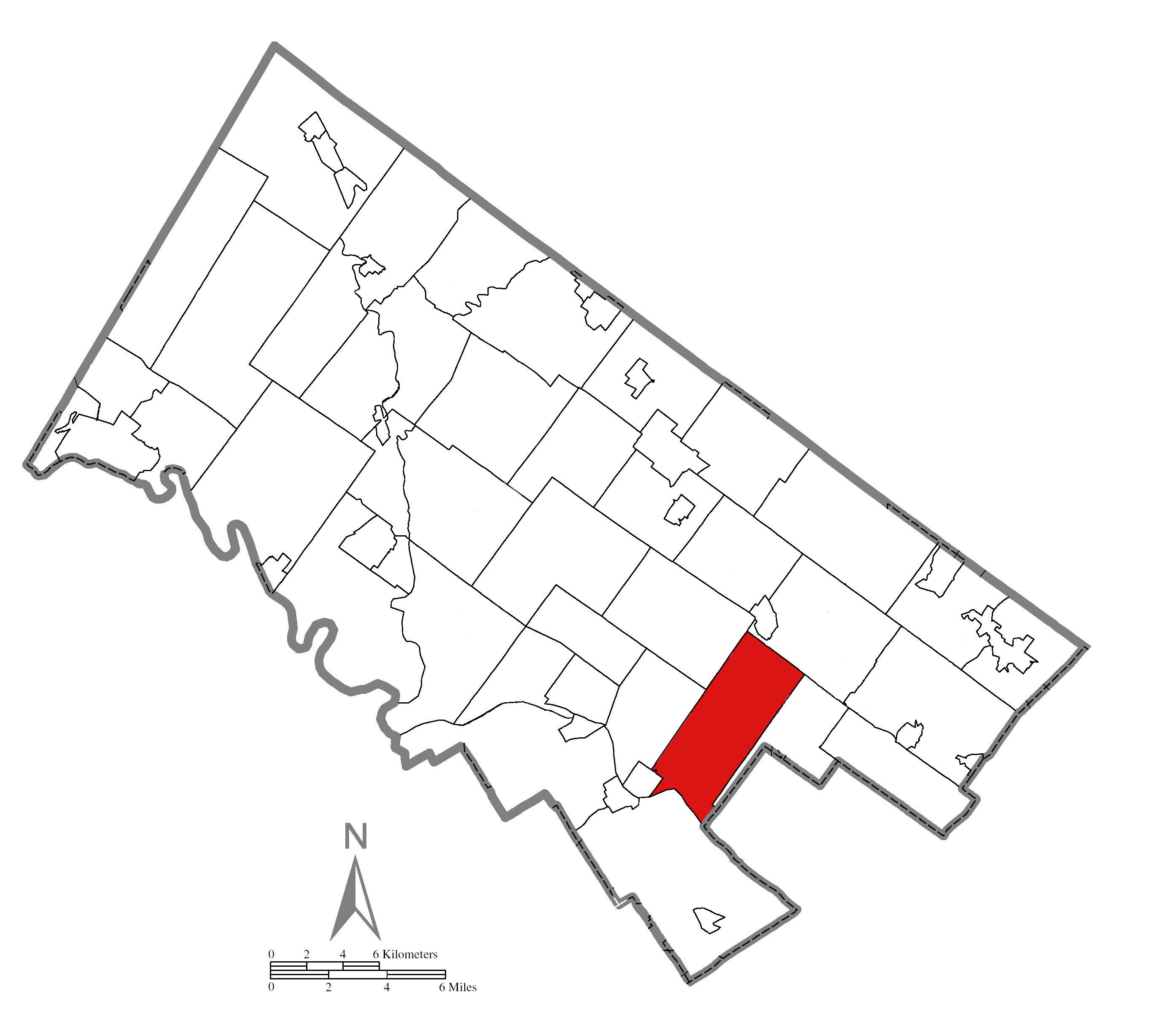
- Location of Whitemarsh Township in Montgomery County, Pennsylvania
- Coordinates: 40°06′00″N 75°14′58″W
- Country: United States
- State: Pennsylvania
- County: Montgomery
- Settled: 1683

Area
  - Total: 14.73 sq mi (38.2 km^{2})
  - Land: 14.59 sq mi (37.8 km^{2})
  - Water: 0.14 sq mi (0.36 km^{2})
- Elevation: 220 ft (67 m)

Population (2010)
  - Total: 17,349
  - Estimate (2016): 17,795
  - Density: 1,189/sq mi (459.1/km^{2})
- Time zone: UTC-5 (EST)
  - Summer (DST): UTC-4 (EDT)
- Area codes: 610, 484
- FIPS code: 42-091-84624
- Website: www.whitemarshtwp.org

Whitemarsh Township is a home-rule township in Montgomery County, Pennsylvania, United States. It retains its former classification of "Township" in its official name despite being a home rule municipality. The population was 19,707 at the 2020 census. Whitemarsh is adjacent to the neighborhood of Andorra in the Roxborough section of Philadelphia, and is bordered in Montgomery County by Springfield, Upper Dublin, Whitpain, and Plymouth townships, Conshohocken, and the Schuylkill River, which separates it from Lower Merion Township.

Communities in Whitemarsh Township include Barren Hill, Lafayette Hill, part of Miquon, which straddles Whitemarsh and Springfield townships, Spring Mill, part of Plymouth Meeting, which straddles Whitemarsh and Plymouth townships, and part of Fort Washington, some of which is in Whitemarsh, but which is chiefly in Upper Dublin Township.

== History ==
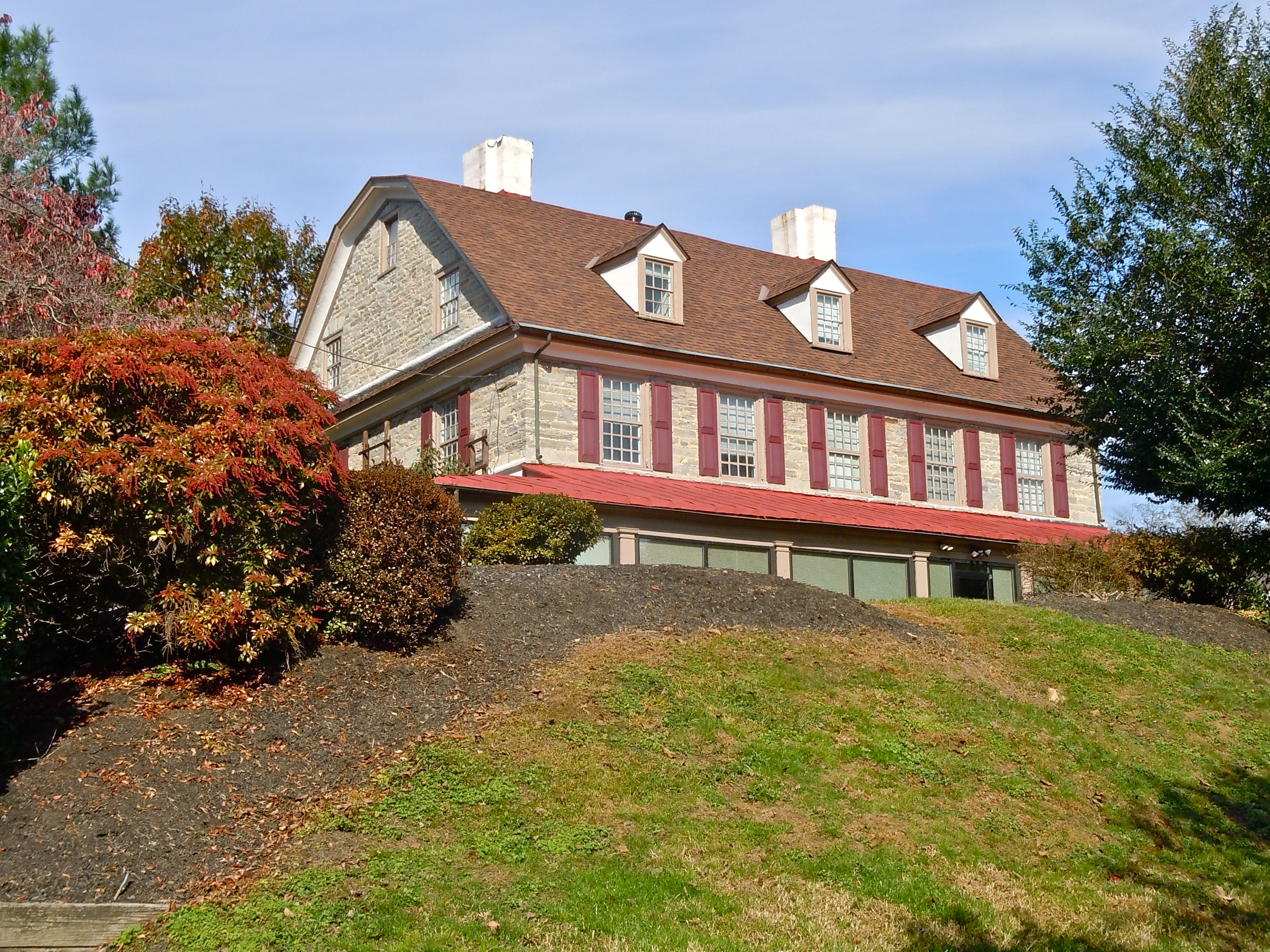
Mount Joy, built 1735

Whitemarsh was originally inhabited by the Lenape tribe of Native Americans. It was first settled by European colonists in 1683. At that time, Whitemarsh was part of a tract of land that Major Jasper Farmar had purchased from William Penn. Farmar died shortly thereafter, before making the voyage across the ocean to settle on his newly purchased land. But his widow and family, with servants, sailed to Philadelphia in 1685, and established their homestead on the part of their land that lay in nearby Fort Washington. After Farmar's widow died in the 1690s, her son Edward began to sell 100- to 200-acre parcels of their Whitemarsh land to Quakers and German immigrants.

In 1686, limestone was discovered in Oreland, which extends across nearby Springfield and Upper Dublin townships. The subsequent discovery of limestone in the township itself drew new settlers to Whitemarsh. In 1704, Whitemarsh Township was incorporated. At that time, it was located in Philadelphia County. In 1784, Montgomery County was created, and Whitemarsh was made part of it, becoming one of the new county's 28 original communities. Throughout the 17th and 18th centuries, Whitemarsh was characterized by large English estates and its famed limestone quarries.

During the American Revolutionary War, both the Battle of White Marsh and the Battle of Barren Hill took place within the township.

=== National Register of Historic Places ===
- Alan West Corson Homestead
- Cold Point Historic District
- County Bridge No. 54
- Farmar Mill
- Hope Lodge
- Hovenden House, Barn and Abolition Hall
- Lee Tire and Rubber Company
- Miller's House at Spring Mill
- Mount Joy
- Plymouth Meeting Historic District
- The Highlands
- Union School

== Geography ==
According to the U.S. Census Bureau, the township has a total area of 14.7 square miles (38.1 km^{2}), of which 14.6 square miles (37.8 km^{2}) is land, and 0.1 square miles (0.3 km^{2}) (0.68%) is water.

The U.S. Census Bureau includes two census-designated places that include parts of Whitemarsh: Plymouth Meeting and Fort Washington.

== Demographics ==
Historical population
| Census | Pop. | Note | %± |
|---|---|---|---|
| 1850 | 2,408 | | — |
| 1860 | 3,047 | | 26.5% |
| 1870 | 3,151 | | 3.4% |
| 1880 | 3,239 | | 2.8% |
| 1890 | 3,516 | | 8.6% |
| 1900 | 3,350 | | −4.7% |
| 1910 | 3,359 | | 0.3% |
| 1920 | 3,436 | | 2.3% |
| 1930 | 4,286 | | 24.7% |
| 1940 | 4,855 | | 13.3% |
| 1950 | 5,977 | | 23.1% |
| 1960 | 12,286 | | 105.6% |
| 1970 | 15,886 | | 29.3% |
| 1980 | 14,987 | | −5.7% |
| 1990 | 14,863 | | −0.8% |
| 2000 | 16,702 | | 12.4% |
| 2010 | 17,349 | | 3.9% |
| 2020 | 19,707 | | 13.6% |
Population 1850-2010

As of the 2010 census, Whitemarsh Township was 90.7% White, 3.5% Black or African American, 0.1% Native American, 4.2% Asian, and 1.2% were two or more races. 1.7% of the population were of Hispanic or Latino ancestry .

As of the 2000 census, there were 16,702 people, 6,179 households, and 4,597 families residing in the township. The population density was 1,143.5 inhabitants per square mile (441.5/km^{2}). There were 6,372 housing units at an average density of 436.3 per square mile (168.5/km^{2}). The racial makeup of the township was 93.29% White, 2.21% African American, 0.02% Native American, 3.70% Asian, 0.14% from other races, and 0.63% from two or more races. Hispanics or Latinos of any race were 0.99% of the population.

There were 6,179 households, out of which 34.4% had children under the age of 18 living with them, 64.4% were married couples living together, 7.1% had a female householder with no husband present, and 25.6% were non-families. 20.8% of all households were made up of individuals, and 7.3% had someone living alone who was 65 years of age or older. The average household size was 2.62 and the average family size was 3.06.

The age distribution was 24.3% under the age of 18, 5.0% from 18 to 24, 29.8% from 25 to 44, 25.1% from 45 to 64, and 15.7% who were 65 years of age or older. The median age was 40 years. For every 100 females there were 93.7 males. For every 100 females age 18 and over, there were 89.6 males.

The median income for a household in the township was $78,630, and the median income for a family was $91,731. Males had a median income of $58,774 versus $41,977 for females. The per capita income for the township was $39,785. About 1.6% of families and 2.9% of the population were below the poverty line, including 1.8% of those under age 18 and 3.1% of those age 65 or over.

== Government ==
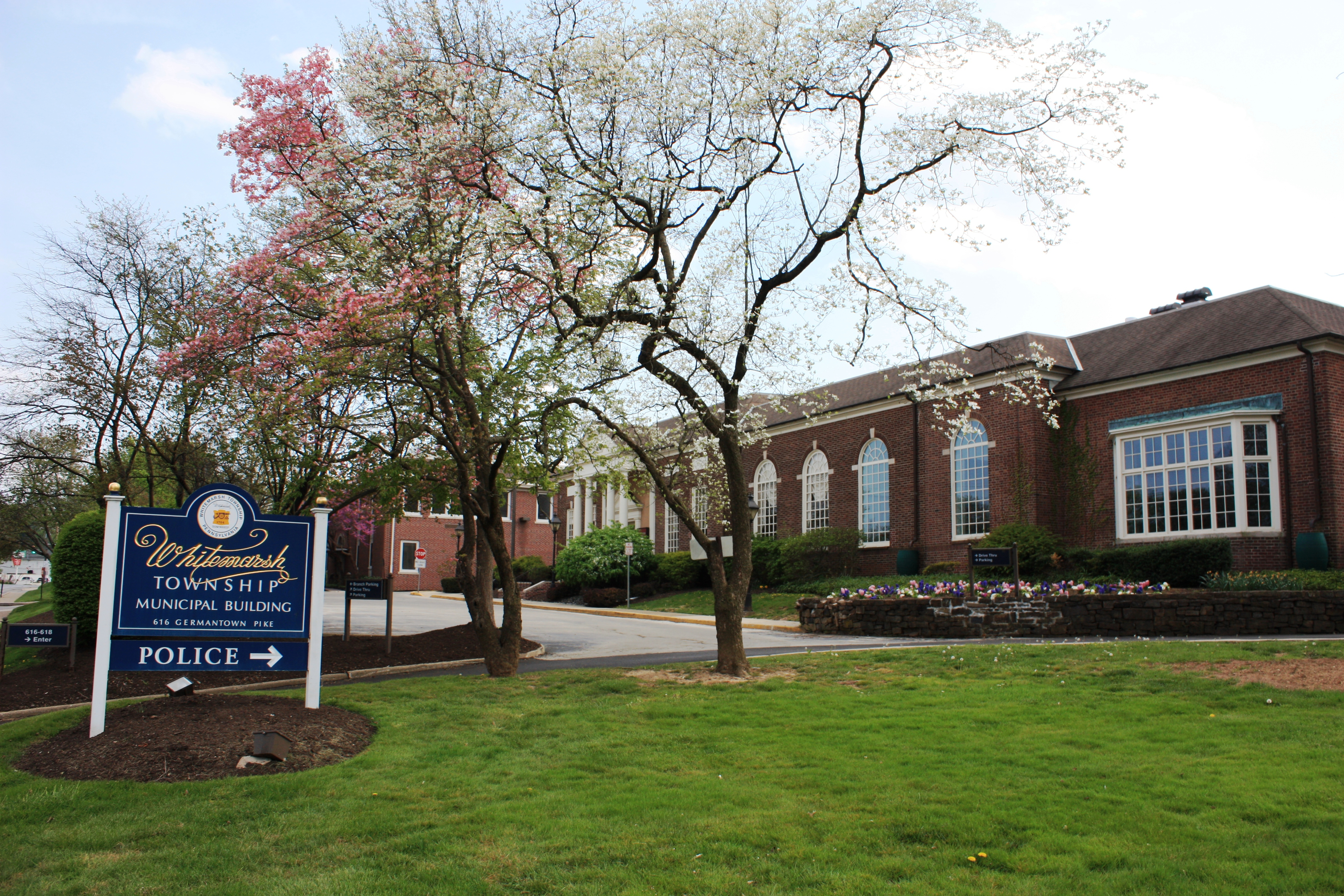
Whitemarsh Township Building

Presidential elections results
| Year | Republican | Democratic |
|---|---|---|
| 2020 | 33.1% 4,413 | 66.1% 8,809 |
| 2016 | 34.2% 3,847 | 61.8% 6,960 |
| 2012 | 43.6% 4,540 | 55.5% 5,782 |
| 2008 | 40.5% 4,311 | 59.0% 6,275 |
| 2004 | 42.8% 4,336 | 56.9% 5,767 |
| 2000 | 42.4% 3,685 | 55.5% 4,822 |
| 1996 | 42.4% 3,173 | 49.4% 3,698 |
| 1992 | 43.3% 3,537 | 42.4% 3,495 |

Whitemarsh Township is governed by a five-member Board of Supervisors elected to four-year terms. Currently, the board members are Chair Jacy Toll, Vice-chair Fran McCusker, Vincent Manuele, Patrice Turenne, and Elizabeth Moy.

== Recreation ==
Fort Washington State Park is a 483-acre (1.95 km^{2}) area in the middle of the township along the Wissahickon Creek.

Miles Park, at the intersection of Germantown Pike and Joshua Road, has basketball courts, baseball fields, a walking track, a snack bar, and vending machines.

Several country clubs have grounds within the town: the Whitemarsh Valley Country Club, the ACE Club, and the Green Valley Club, which each have one golf course, and the Philadelphia Cricket Club, which has two golf courses.

== Education ==
The Colonial School District provides public education to the children of Whitemarsh Township.

== Transportation ==
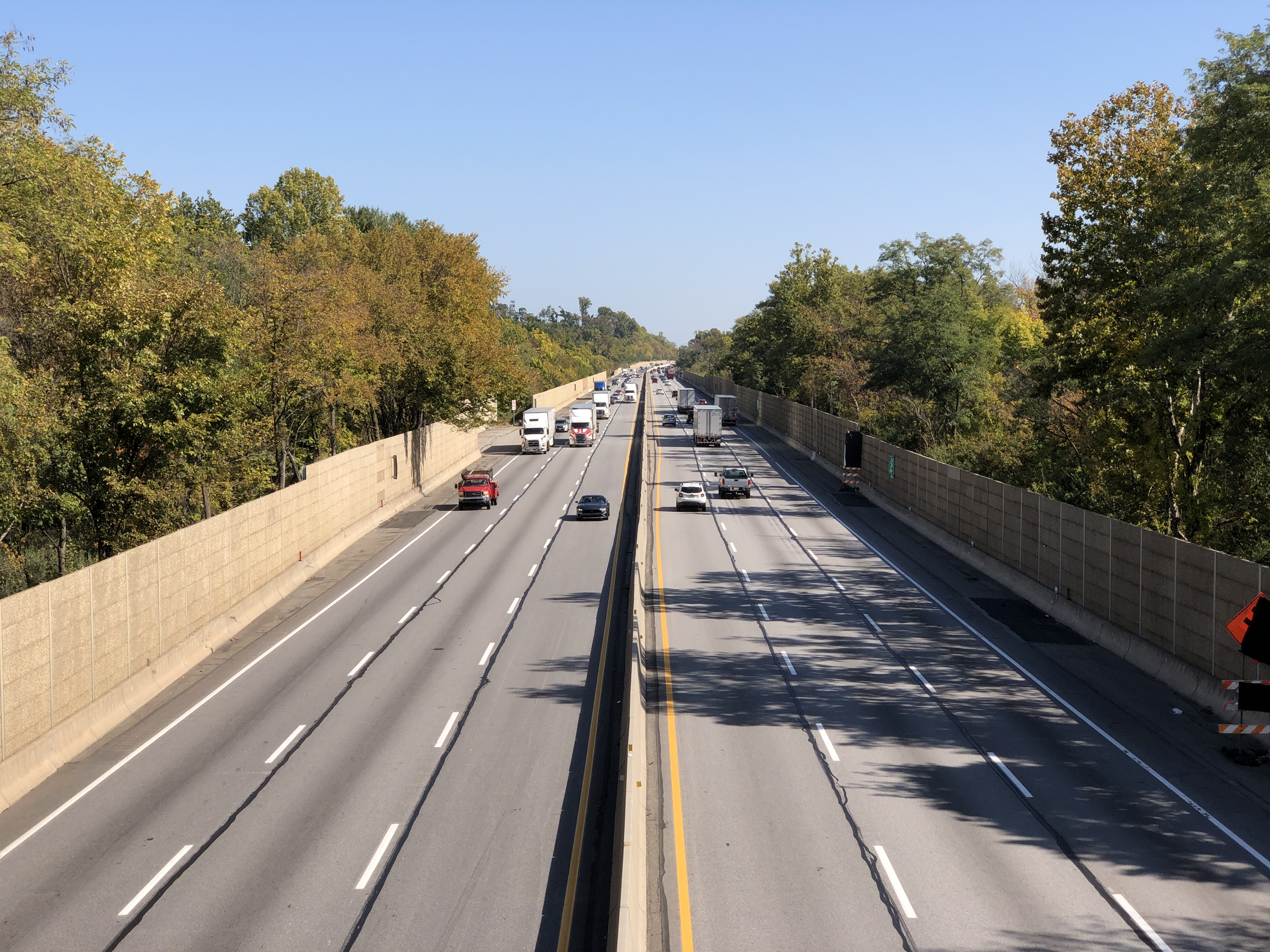
I-276/Pennsylvania Turnpike eastbound in Whitemarsh Township

As of 2018, there were 88.36 miles (142.20 km) of public roads in Whitemarsh Township, of which 3.70 miles (5.95 km) were maintained by the Pennsylvania Turnpike Commission (PTC), 25.03 miles (40.28 km) were maintained by the Pennsylvania Department of Transportation (PennDOT) and 59.63 miles (95.97 km) were maintained by the township.

The east–west Pennsylvania Turnpike (Interstate 276) and the north-south Fort Washington Expressway (Pennsylvania Route 309) run through the township. Although neither has an interchange in Whitemarsh, the turnpike has an interchange in nearby Plymouth Township, and the Route 309 expressway has an interchange in nearby Fort Washington that also connects with the turnpike. Arterial roads in the township include Ridge Pike, Germantown Pike, Butler Pike, Skippack Pike (Pennsylvania Route 73), Bethlehem Pike, Stenton Avenue, Pennsylvania Avenue, Joshua Road, and Morris Road.

Two SEPTA Regional Rail lines serve the township. The Lansdale/Doylestown line, which connects Bucks, Montgomery, and Philadelphia counties, has a station on the easternmost side of the township: the Fort Washington station. And the Manayunk/Norristown line, which runs along the Schuylkill River, has two stations on the westernmost side of the township: one in Miquon and another, farther north, in Spring Mill.

SEPTA operates City Bus Routes 27 and 51 and Suburban Bus Routes 94, 95, 97, and 201 in the township, connecting it to Philadelphia and to other suburbs.

Since December 21, 2017, OurBus has provided Whitemarsh Township with intercity bus service, as part of a route that runs from West Chester, Pennsylvania, to Park Avenue on Manhattan Island in New York City. The bus stop in Fort Washington is adjacent to the Fort Washington railroad station.

Norfolk Southern Railway's Morrisville Line, which carries only freight, passes through Whitemarsh Township, running parallel to the southern side of the Pennsylvania Turnpike.

There are no airports in Whitemarsh Township. The closest airport is the Wings Field in Whitpain Township.

== See also ==
- National Register of Historic Places listings in Montgomery County, Pennsylvania
- Great Train Wreck of 1856
- St. Thomas' Church, Whitemarsh
- Erdenheim Farm

| Preceded by Lower Merion | Bordering communities of Philadelphia | Succeeded by Springfield Township |
