= Union School (Fort Washington, Pennsylvania) =

- U.S. National Register of Historic Places
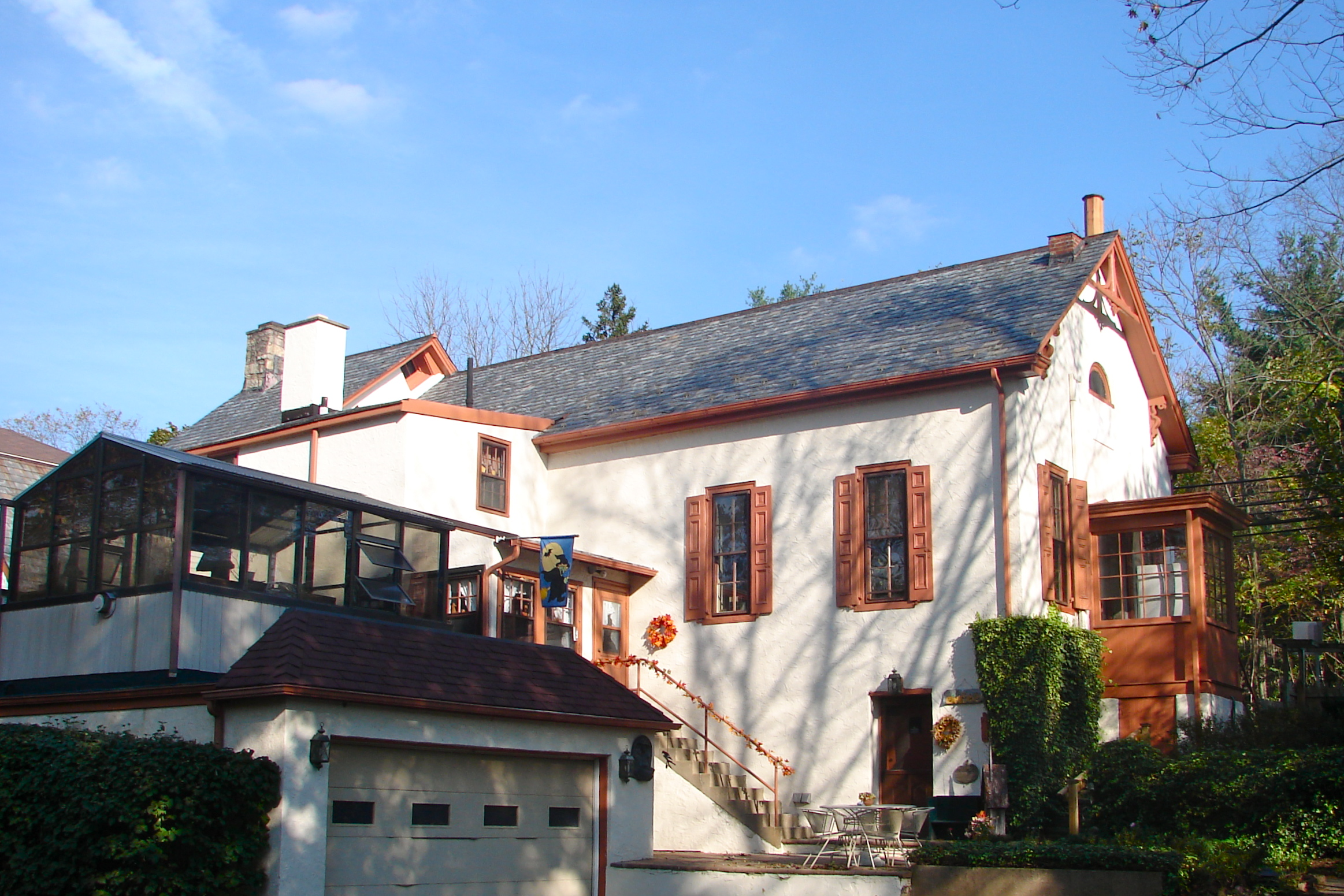
- Union School, October 2011

- Location within Pennsylvania Location within the United States
- Location: 516-518 Bethlehem Pike, Fort Washington, Pennsylvania
- Coordinates: 40°7′43″N 75°13′6″W
- Area: 0.8 acres (0.32 ha)
- Built: 1773
- NRHP reference No.: 80003576
- Added to NRHP: August 11, 1980

The Union School is an historic building that is located at 516-518 Bethlehem Pike in the Fort Washington section of Whitemarsh Township, Pennsylvania, United States.

The Union School has been listed on the U.S. National Register of Historic Places since 1980.

== History and architectural features ==
Built in 1773, the Union School was one of the earliest public schools in Pennsylvania, and the first that did not discriminate based on social position or religious preference. The building is sometimes referred to as the "cradle of free education."

As part of his will, local Quaker businessman Samuel Morris stipulated that a sum of money from his estate be set for the building of a school and a teacher's salary. The school was to provide free education for all within a one-and-a-half-mile radius of Hope Lodge, his country mansion. After Morris died in 1770, his brother Joshua had the school built.

The original section was built in 1773 and is a two-and-one-half-story building that measures twenty-three feet wide by forty-eight feet long. The school and attached schoolmaster's house were built using fieldstone portions that were covered in painted stucco. In 1792, the Union School was incorporated as the Union School in Whitemarsh. The school was in continuous use from 1773 until 1936, except for a brief period in 1873 when it served as a lyceum. The trust fund established by Samuel Morris remains in existence today, supporting education in the townships of Whitpain, Whitemarsh and Upper Dublin in Pennsylvania.

Today, the Union School building is a privately owned residence. The museum of the Fort Washington Historical Society in the Clifton House contains a replica of the school room.

== See also ==
- Clifton House
