= Ramel =

Ramel is a masculine given name of multicultural origin. In Syriac (Sureth/Assyrian Neo-Aramaic), the name is traditionally interpreted to mean “God is exalted”, derived from the root rām (to be high, exalted) and El (God). The name appears in modern Assyrian communities as a personal name.

In French, Ramel is primarily encountered as a surname, originating from regional toponyms in southern France. It is believed to derive from Old Occitan elements related to “branch,” “twig,” or “vine shoot” (ramel or rameta), indicating a family that lived near or worked with woodland or vineyards.

In German, Ramel is also used as a surname, often considered a variant of names related to “Ramm” or “Ramelow,” which trace back to Middle High German terms meaning “raven” (ram), or to occupational and place-based names. The German usage is largely hereditary and not etymologically connected to the Syriac form.

== People ==
=== Given name ===
- Ramel Bradley, American professional basketball player who currently plays for Hapoel Holon of the Israeli Basketball Premier League
- Ramel Curry, American former professional basketball player
- Ramel Keyton (born 2000), American football player

=== Surname ===
- Brooke Ramel, American singer-songwriter
- Dominique-Vincent Ramel-Nogaret (1760–1829), French lawyer and politician
- Françoise Roch-Ramel (1931–2001), Swiss pharmacologist
- Fredrik Ramel (1872–1947), Swedish baron, governor, diplomat and officer
- Hans Ramel (1867–1957), Swedish landlord, hovjägmästare (Master of the Horse) and member of parliament
- Jean-Pierre Ramel (1768–1815), French general
- Josiah Ramel (c.2020s), known professionally as Lithe, Australian rapper, singer, songwriter, and record producer
- Lotta Ramel (born 1957), Swedish actress and director
- Juliette Ramel (born 1987), Swedish Olympic dressage rider
- Kathryn Ramel (born 1973), cricketer
- Povel Ramel (1922–2007), Swedish singer, pianist, vaudeville artist, author, and novelty song composer
- Regis de Ramel (born 1974), aviation business owner and philanthropist

== Other ==
- Ahl Ramel, small town and rural commune in Taroudant Province of the Souss-Massa-Drâa region of Morocco
- Sania Ramel Airport, airport serving Tétouan
- SS Commissaire Ramel, a French cargo-passenger ship
- the Eastern Pomerania town Rahmel; see Rumia
