= Wings Airways =

| IATA | ICAO | Call sign |
|---|---|---|
| WQ | WAW | WING SHUTTLE |
- Founded: 1976; 49 years ago
- Commenced operations: February 21, 1977; 48 years ago
- Ceased operations: Early 1991; 34 years ago
- Operating bases: Blue Bell, Pennsylvania
- Fleet size: 3 different types of aircraft.
- Headquarters: Blue Bell, Pennsylvania
- Key people: Henry McNeil, Richard Fox, William Arner

Wings Airways was a commuter airline based out of Wings Field in Blue Bell, Pennsylvania.

The airline focused primarily on shuttling passengers to nearby airports throughout the region. Wings Airways promised faster commute times to and from major airports for those living in neighboring suburban areas of Philadelphia. The primary route served by the air carrier was the short hop between Wings Field (KLOM) (BBX) in Blue Bell and the Philadelphia International Airport (KPHL)(PHL) which was a flight of less than 15 minutes. From the late 1970s to the late 1980s, Wings operated a high frequency shuttle service between LOM and PHL with up to 22 round trip flights on weekdays.

However, the airline then shutdown during the early 1990s due to the construction of Interstate 476 and other highways and freeways in the greater Philadelphia area, which made it easier for those living in the suburbs to access Philadelphia International Airport. According to a publication by 2004 newsletter from Wings Field, there were 152 operations a day at Wings Field (55,540 for the year) during the airline's peak in 1990.

== Fleet ==
Wings Airways Fleet
| Aircraft | Total |
|---|---|
| Britten-Norman Trislander | 4 |
| Britten-Norman Islander | 6 |
| de Havilland Canada DHC-6 Twin Otter | 1 |

All three of the above aircraft types featured short takeoff and landing (STOL) performance. Wings Airways was one of the few commuter airlines in the U.S. to operate the Trislander in scheduled passenger service.

== Destinations ==
United States:

- Delaware
  - Dover
- New Jersey
  - Cape May Airport - WWD
  - Millville, New Jersey (Millville Municipal Airport)
- New York
  - New York (John F. Kennedy International Airport)
- Pennsylvania
  - Allentown (Lehigh Valley International Airport)
  - Blue Bell (Wings Field) Base
  - Northeast Philadelphia (Northeast Philadelphia Airport)
  - Philadelphia (Philadelphia International Airport)
- Virginia
  - Dulles (Washington Dulles International Airport)
- District of Columbia
  - Washington D.C. (Washington National Airport)

See timetables at http://www.airtimes.com/cgat/usc/wings.htm

== See also ==
- List of defunct airlines of the United States
- Wings Field
