= Bluestone Country Club =

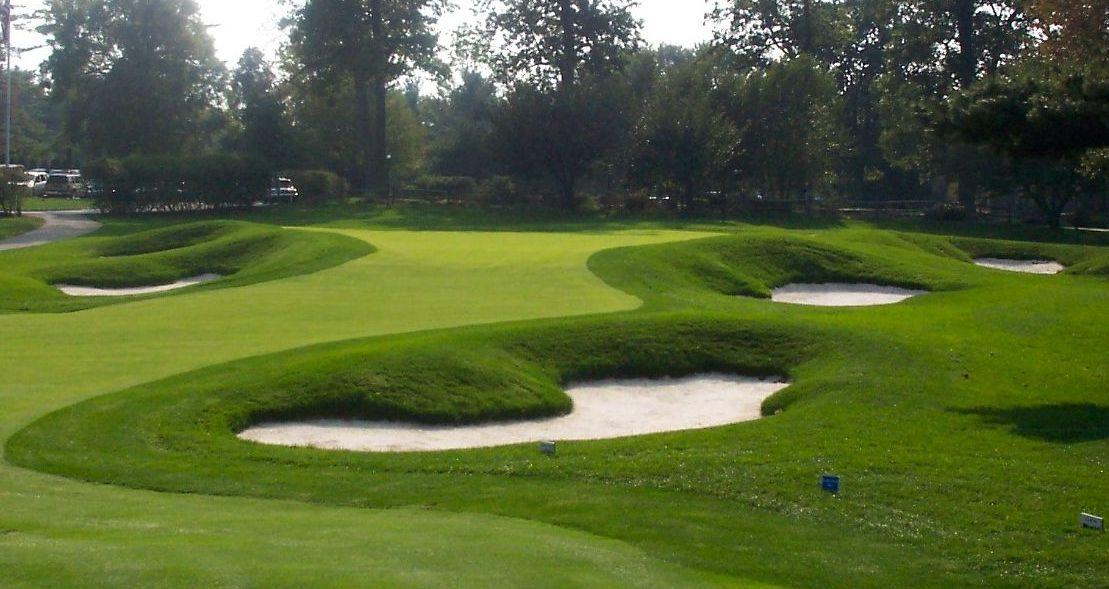
- 18th Green

- Location within Pennsylvania
- 40°09′41″N 75°16′01″W

Club information
- Location: Blue Bell, Pennsylvania, U.S.
- Established: 1949 as Meadowlands Country Club
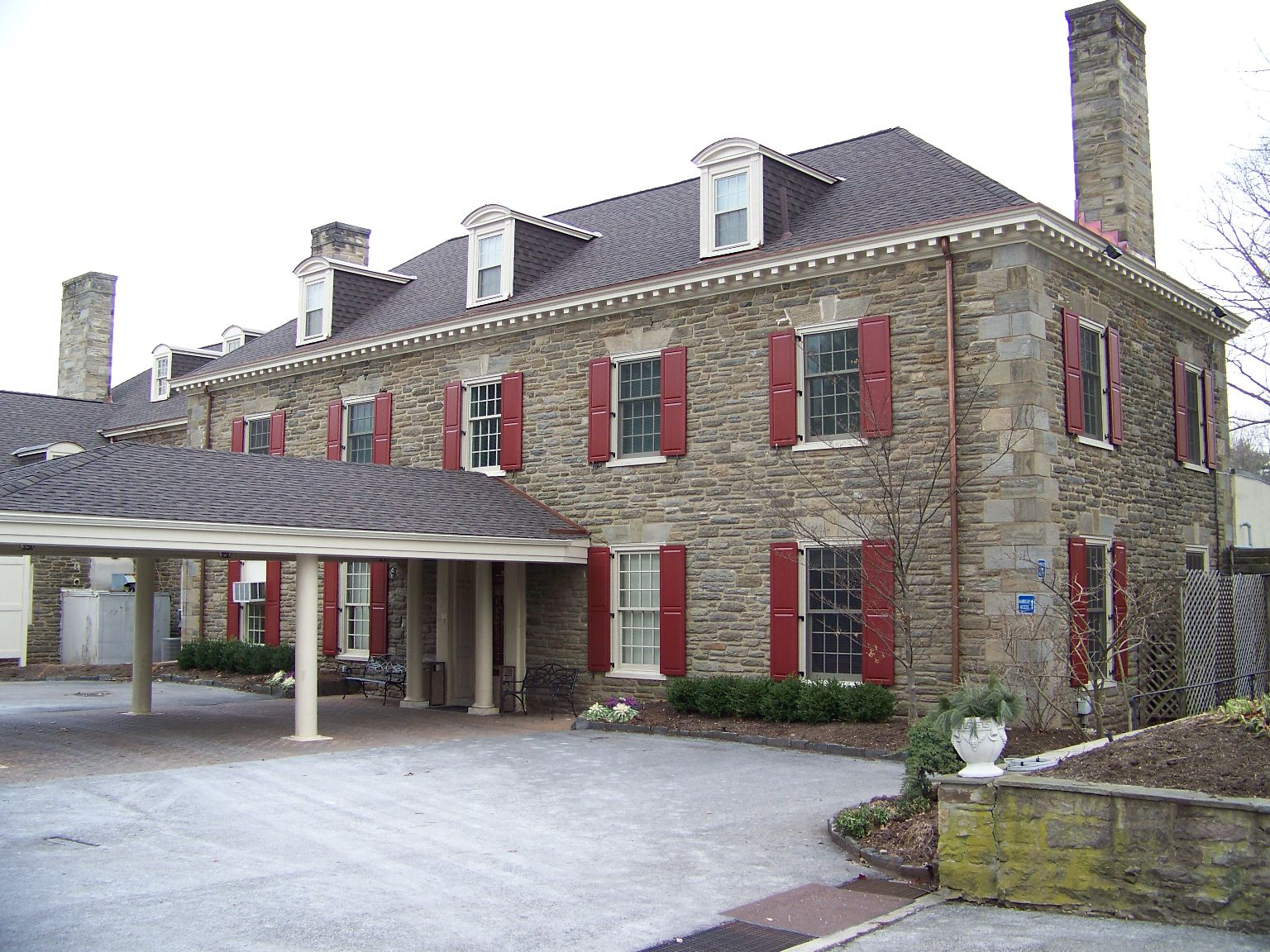
- The Main House

Bluestone Country Club is a private country club in Blue Bell, Pennsylvania, founded in 1949 as Meadowlands Country Club.

== History ==
The founding members, led by Sylvan M. Cohen, a Philadelphia attorney, included the club's first board of governors: Harry Blofstein, Morris Boehm, Alfred B. Carp, Sylvan M. Cohen, Sidney Cohn, Max E. Falik, Milton Gold, Samuel Green, Leonard Gross, Harold L. Landesberg, Ben F. Lieber, Jules Link, J. Leonard Schorr, Irvin Segal, Walter Seideman, Paul Silver, Myron B. Sloane, Edward Taxin, Howard Weiss, and Jack L. Wolgin. Sylvan Cohen was elected president. The other officers were Alfred Carp, secretary; Irvin Segal, treasurer; Jack Wolgin, vice president; Max Falik, vice president; and Harold Landesberg, vice president.

Designed by William Gordon and his son David Gordon, the Championship Course was built in former pasture land for cattle and horses. In the mid-1990s, the Maryland-based firm of Ault, Clark and Associates were brought in to make changes to the Gordon's layout. Seven new holes were added, and a were revised.

In 2004, Meadowlands member Scott Ehrlich def. Michael Tash (Tavistock CC) 5&4 at Philadelphia Cricket Club (Militia Hill) for the Philadelphia Amateur Championship. This championship has been won over the years by J. Wood Platt, Bill Hyndman, Jay Sigel, O. Gordon Brewer Jr. and George Marucci Jr. Many of these players have gone on to amateur and professional careers in golf. Scott Ehrlich has played in the NGA Pro Golf Tour.

In June 2007, Meadowlands Country Club also became the first private country club in the United States to open itself up to military families. The local Supervisors of Whitpain Township, Pennsylvania. declared Monday, June 18 Armed Forces Appreciation Day in the township. Meadowlands Country Club invited local service people who served in Afghanistan and Iraq, and their families, to use the club's recreational facilities that day. Club members served as caddies and served food to the guests.

In 2007, The Championship Course was utilized as a qualifying venue for the U.S. Amateur.

In 2016, Meadowlands was sold amid financial trouble. The club was later renamed Bluestone Country Club.
