= The Highlands (Whitemarsh, Pennsylvania) =

Historic house in Pennsylvania, United States

- U.S. National Register of Historic Places
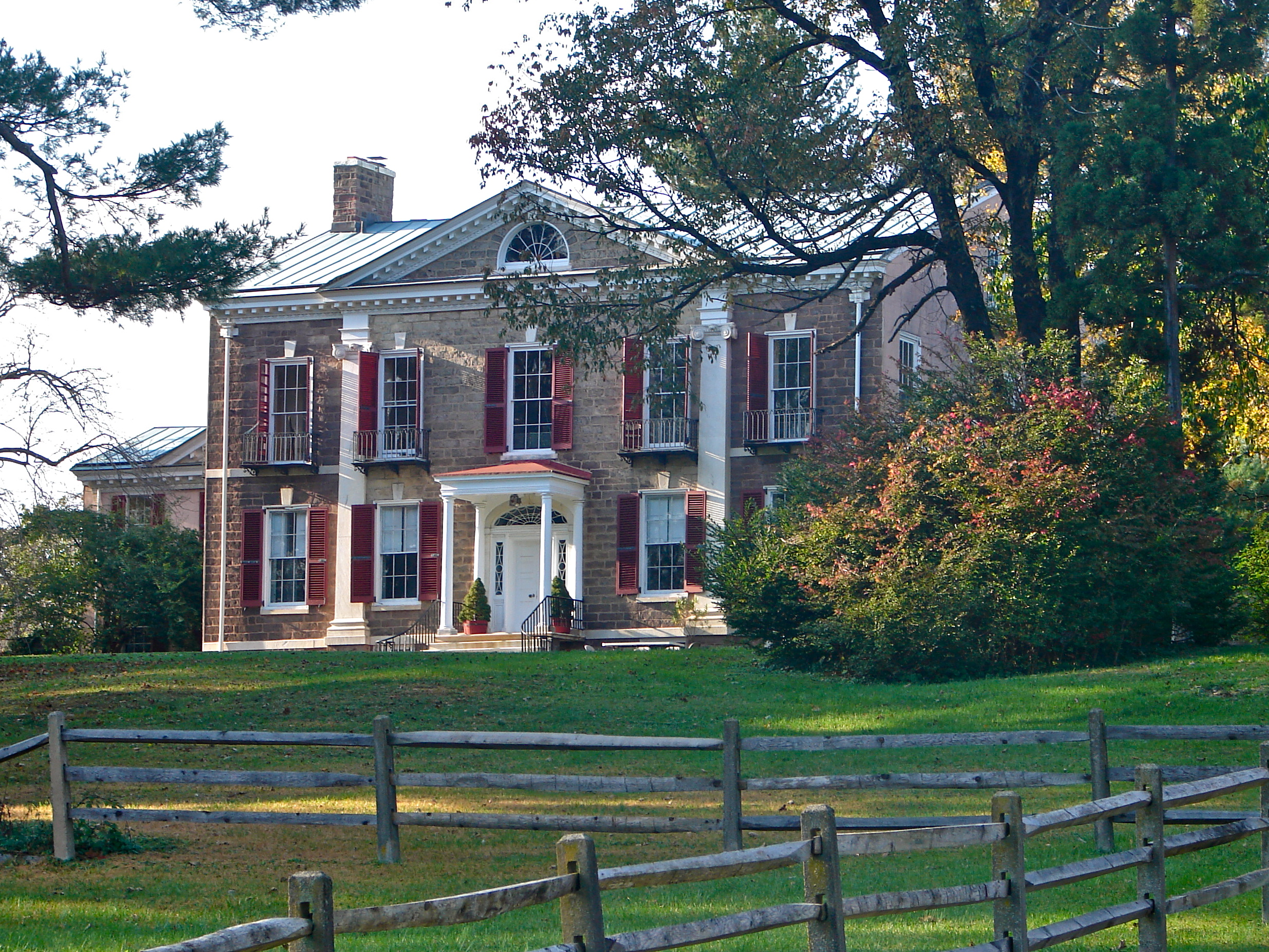

- Location within Pennsylvania Location within the United States
- Location: 7001 Sheaff Lane, Whitemarsh Township, Pennsylvania
- Coordinates: 40°8′4″N 75°13′56″W
- Area: 44 acres (180,000 m^{2})
- Built: 1794
- Architect: Col. Timothy Matlack
- Architectural style: Georgian
- NRHP reference No.: 76001653
- Added to NRHP: December 12, 1976

The Highlands is a historic building and property located near Fort Washington, Whitemarsh Township, Montgomery County, Pennsylvania, in the United States.

The Highlands was built in 1794-1796 by Philadelphia merchant and politician Anthony Morris (1766-1860), and was designed by Philadelphia politician Timothy Matlack (1730-1829). It is a large 2 1/2-story, dressed fieldstone structure in the late Georgian style. The front facade features two, two-story, Ionic order pilasters. Morris was the speaker of the Pennsylvania senate, and had signed the bill authorizing troops to suppress the Whiskey Rebellion. He was also a director of the Bank of North America (1800-1806) and a trustee of the University of Pennsylvania (1806-1817). From 1810 to 1814, he was President James Madison's unofficial envoy to Spain.

Morris sold the property to Daniel Hittner (1765-1841) in 1808. In the five years that Hittner owned the estate, he accumulated 300+ additional acres. In 1813, it was sold to wine merchant George Sheaff (1779-1851). After Sheaff's death, the heirs sold off the majority of the estate, leaving a mere 59 acres (240,000 m^{2}) remaining with Sheaff's grandson, John. In 1917, after the death of the last remaining Sheaff heir, it was sold to Miss Caroline Sinkler, and then subsequently sold to her niece Emily Sinkler Roosevelt in 1941. Roosevelt and her husband donated the property to the Commonwealth of Pennsylvania in 1957.

Today, the Highlands is a 44-acre (180,000 m^{2}) site with a late 18th-century Georgian mansion and formal gardens. It is operated as a museum and historic site by the Highlands Historical Society, a non-profit educational organization. It is available to rent for weddings and parties.

The Highlands Historical Society also runs a number of social and fund-raising events throughout the year. One of these events is the annual Highlands Craft Show which began in 1982 as a means to raise funds to support the restoration of the 2-acre (8,100 m^{2}) formal garden. The craft show has become an excellent venue where unique artisans throughout the United States can gather to display their crafts within the mansion. Some of the crafts that are offered for sale include fabric, fabric arts, pottery, hand-bags, and hand-crafted jewelry. Other popular events include a pumpkin and jack-o-lantern display which takes place around Halloween, and the Highlands Hunt Breakfast which takes place in early November. The Hunt Breakfast consists of a mock fox hunt equipped with a pack of hounds and approximately 20 local horseback riders who ride through surrounding properties, eventually returning to the mansion to rest and eat breakfast with friends and family.

== Gallery ==
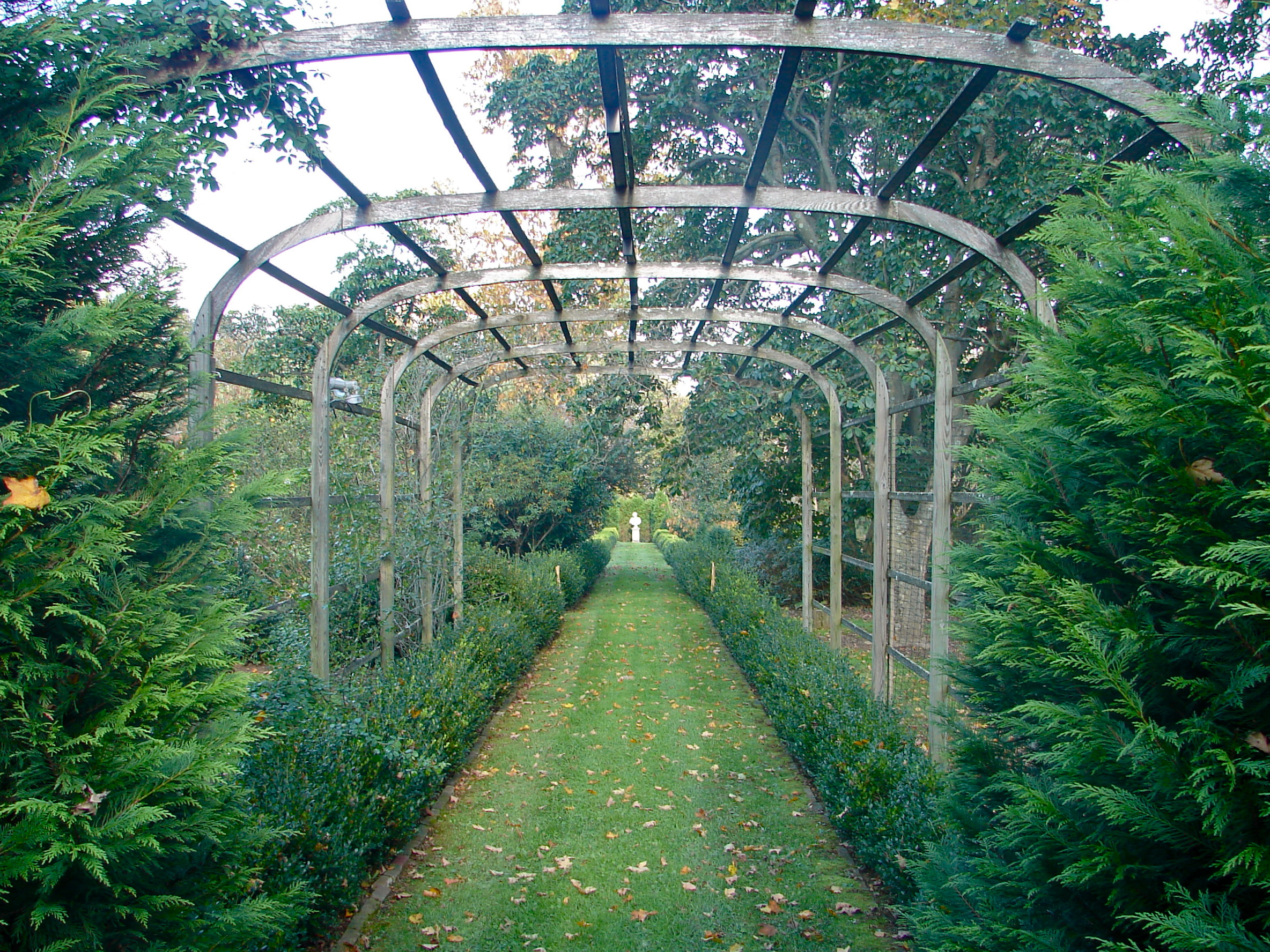
Alley in the garden

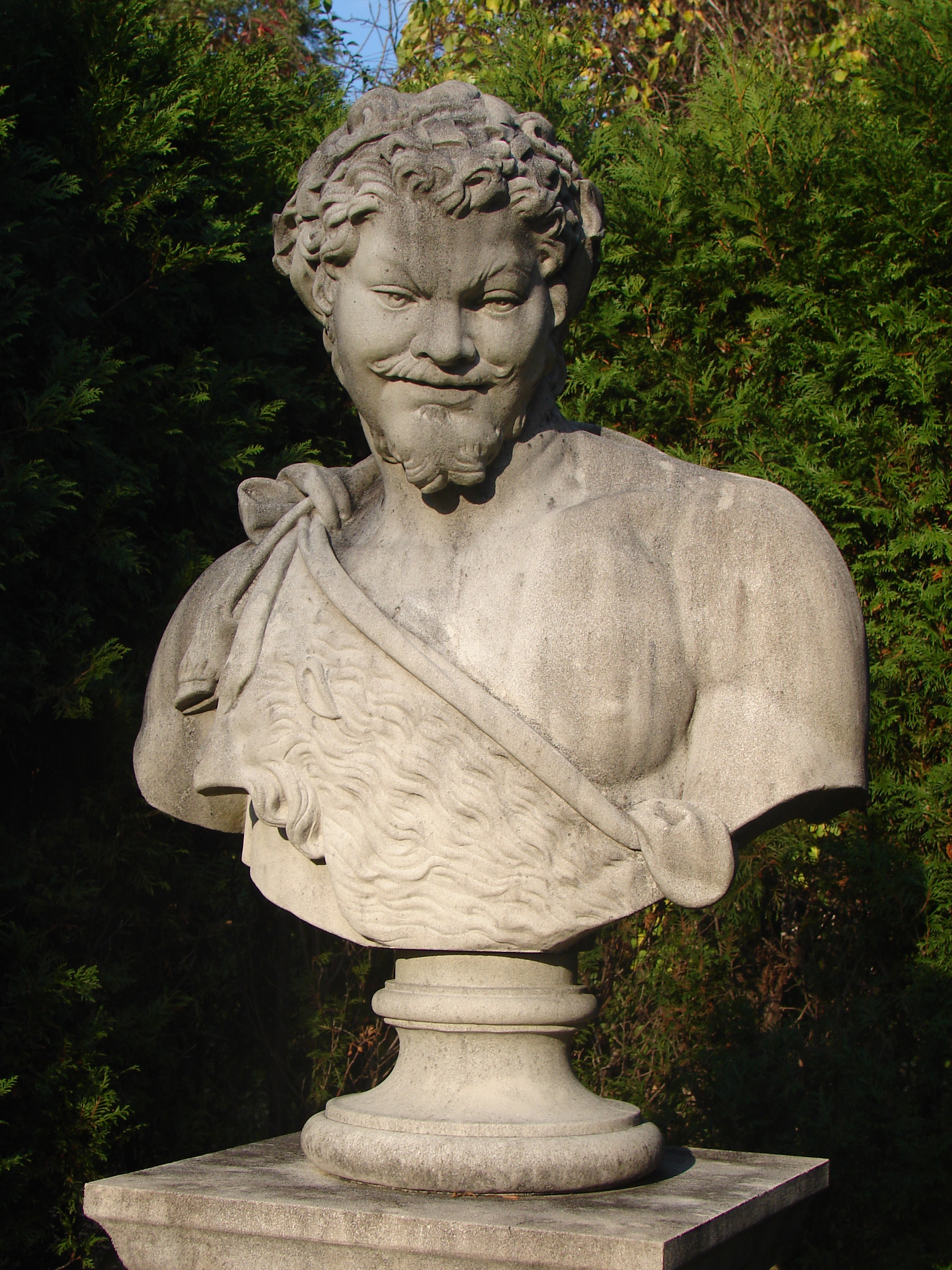
Bust of a faun in the garden

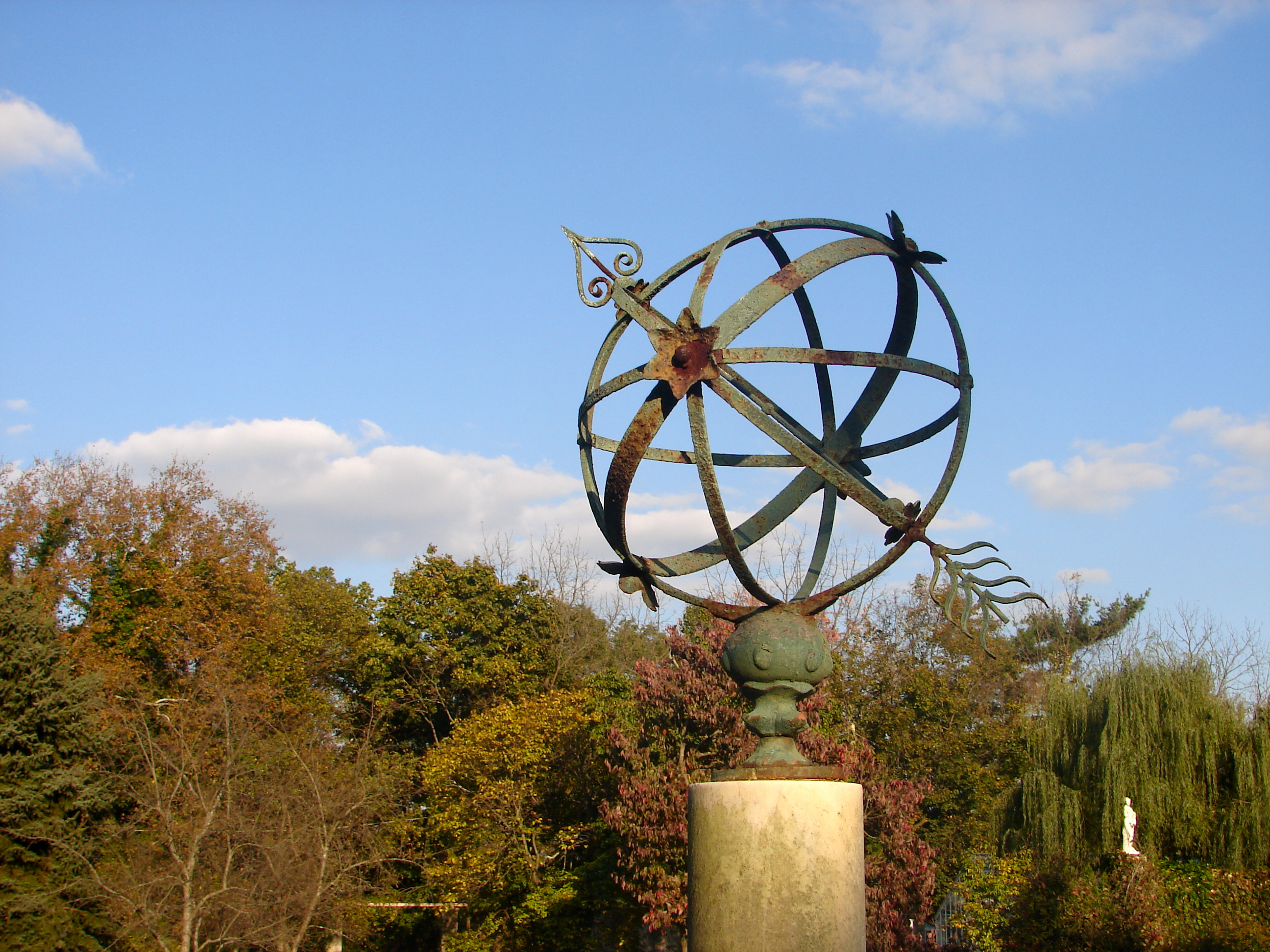
Armillary sphere in the garden

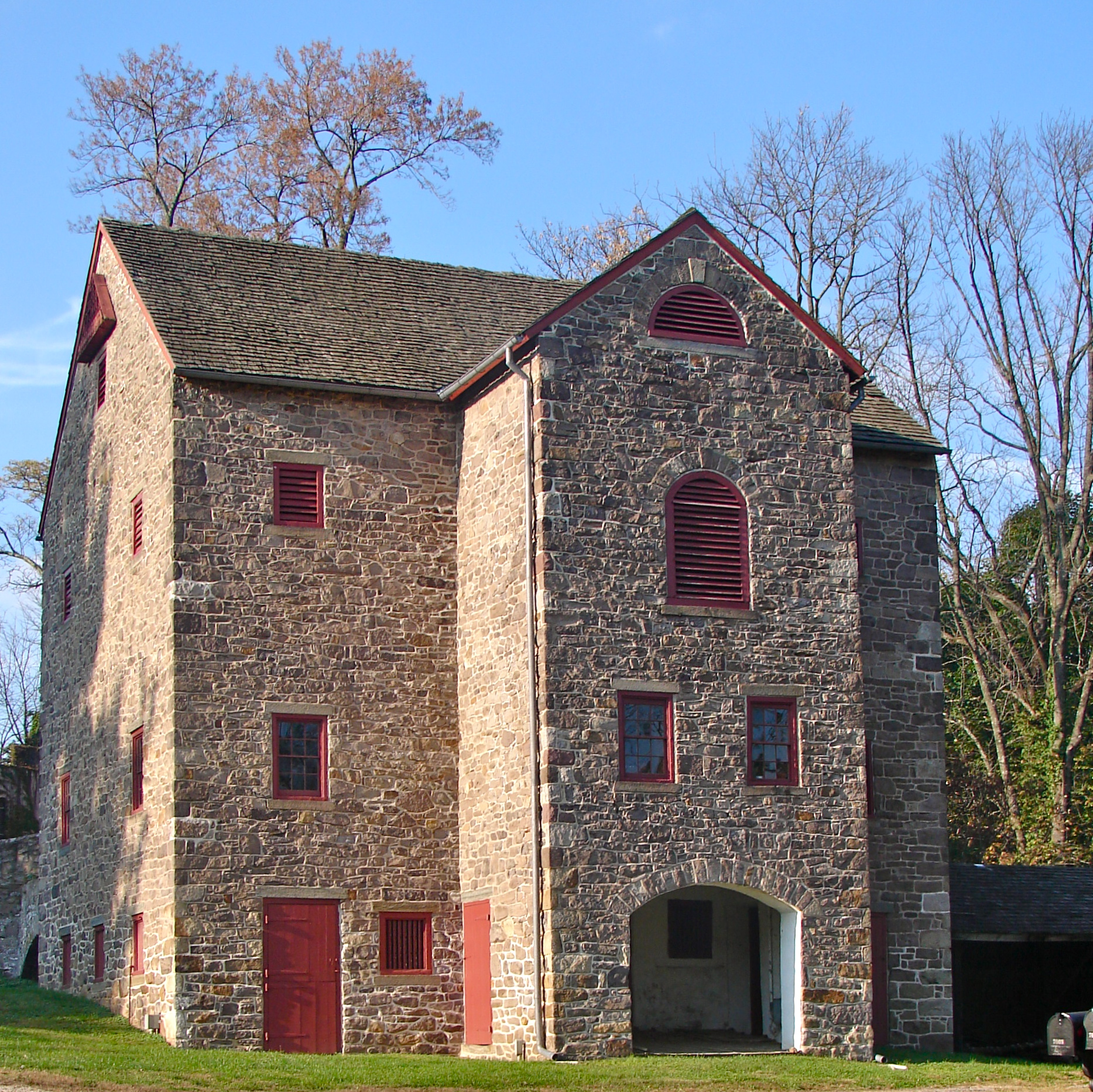
Barn from the southeast

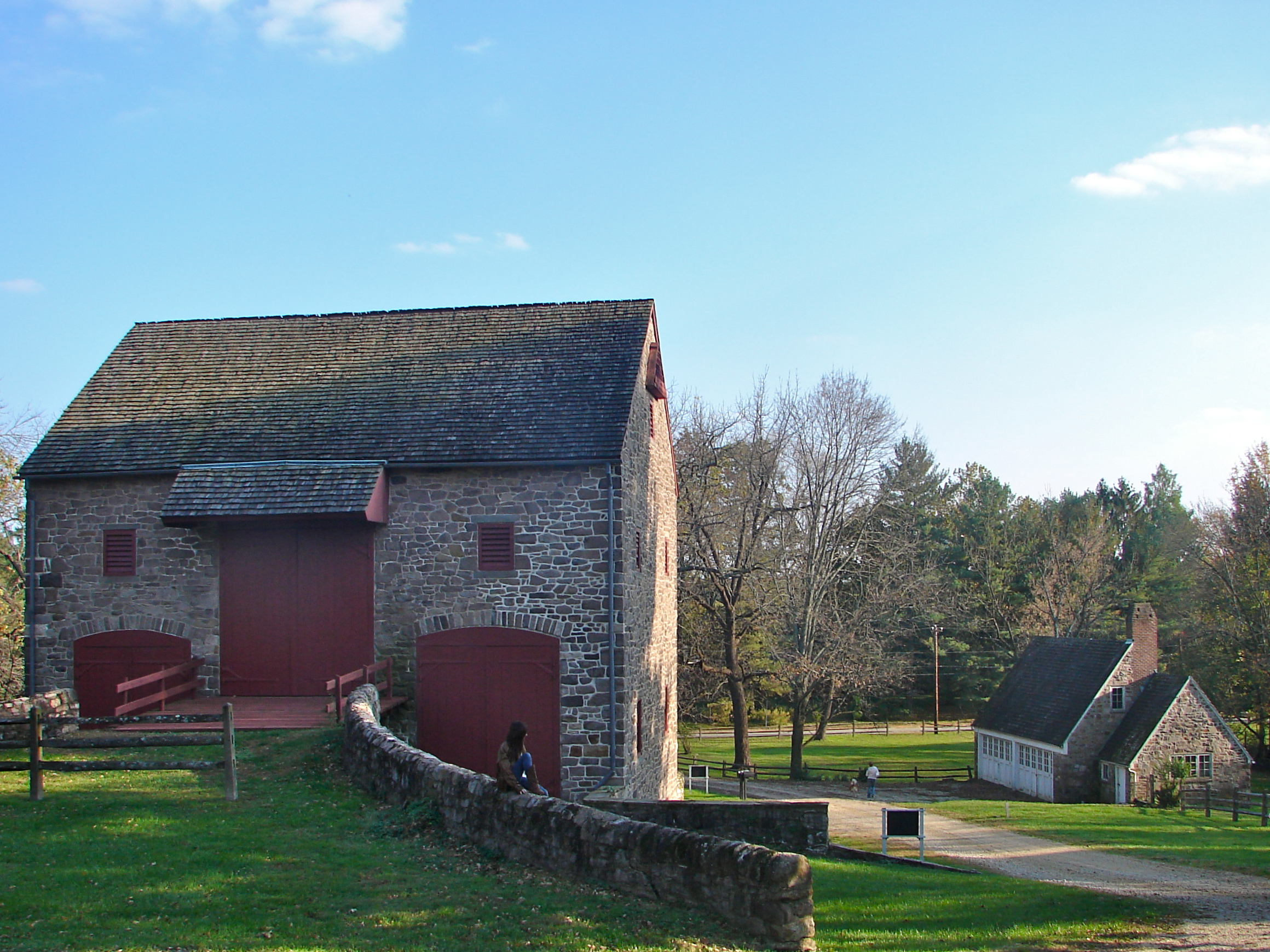
Barn from the northwest

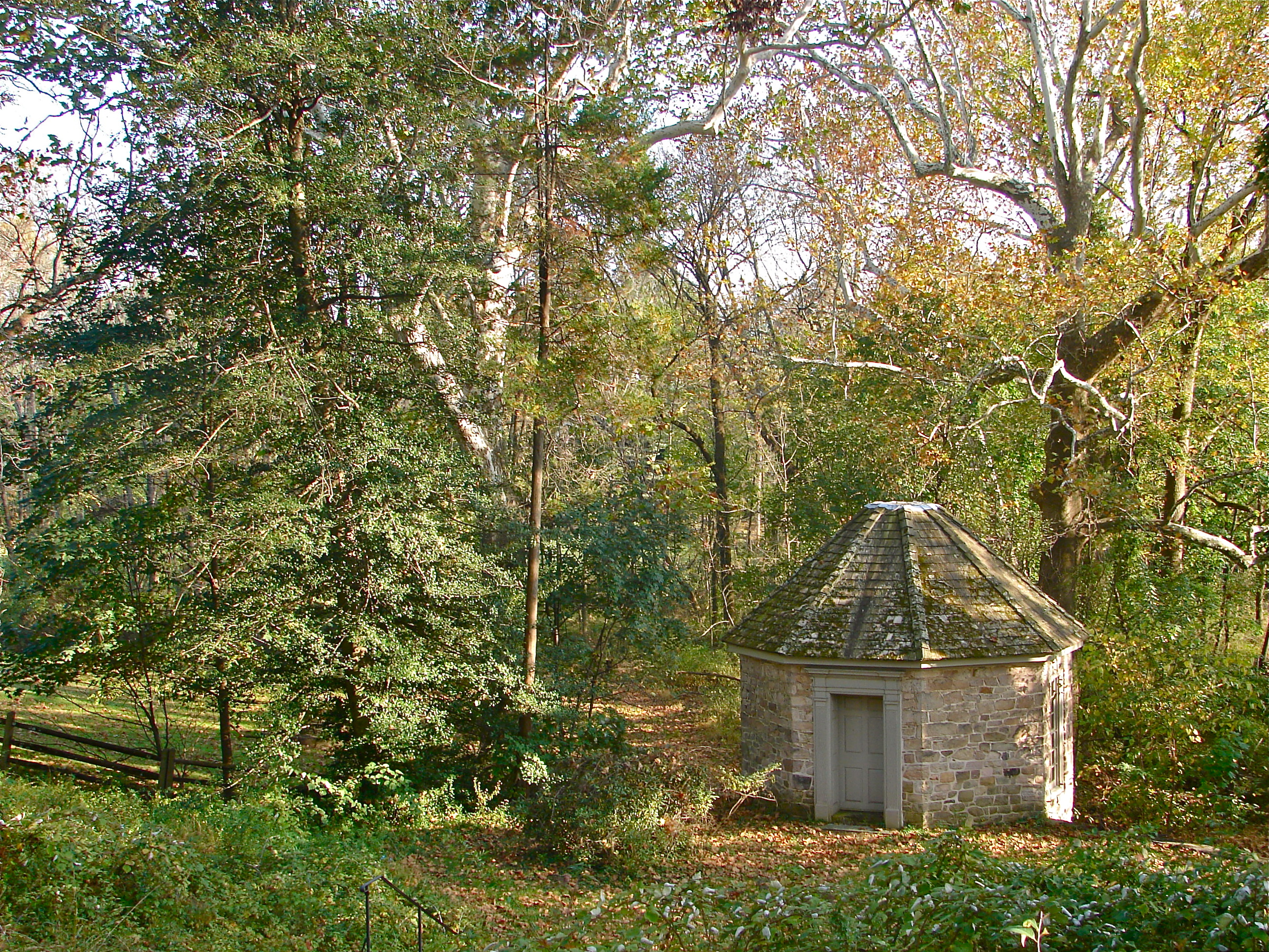
Springhouse

== Owners of the Highlands ==
- 1796 to 1808: Anthony Morris
- 1808 to 1813: Daniel Hittner
- 1813 to 1917: George Sheaff and heirs
- 1917 to 1941: Miss Caroline Sinkler
- 1941 to 1957: Emily Sinkler Roosevelt and her husband Nicholas
- 1957 to 2021: Commonwealth of Pennsylvania
- 2021 to present: Whitemarsh Township, PA
