= County Bridge No. 54 =

- U.S. National Register of Historic Places
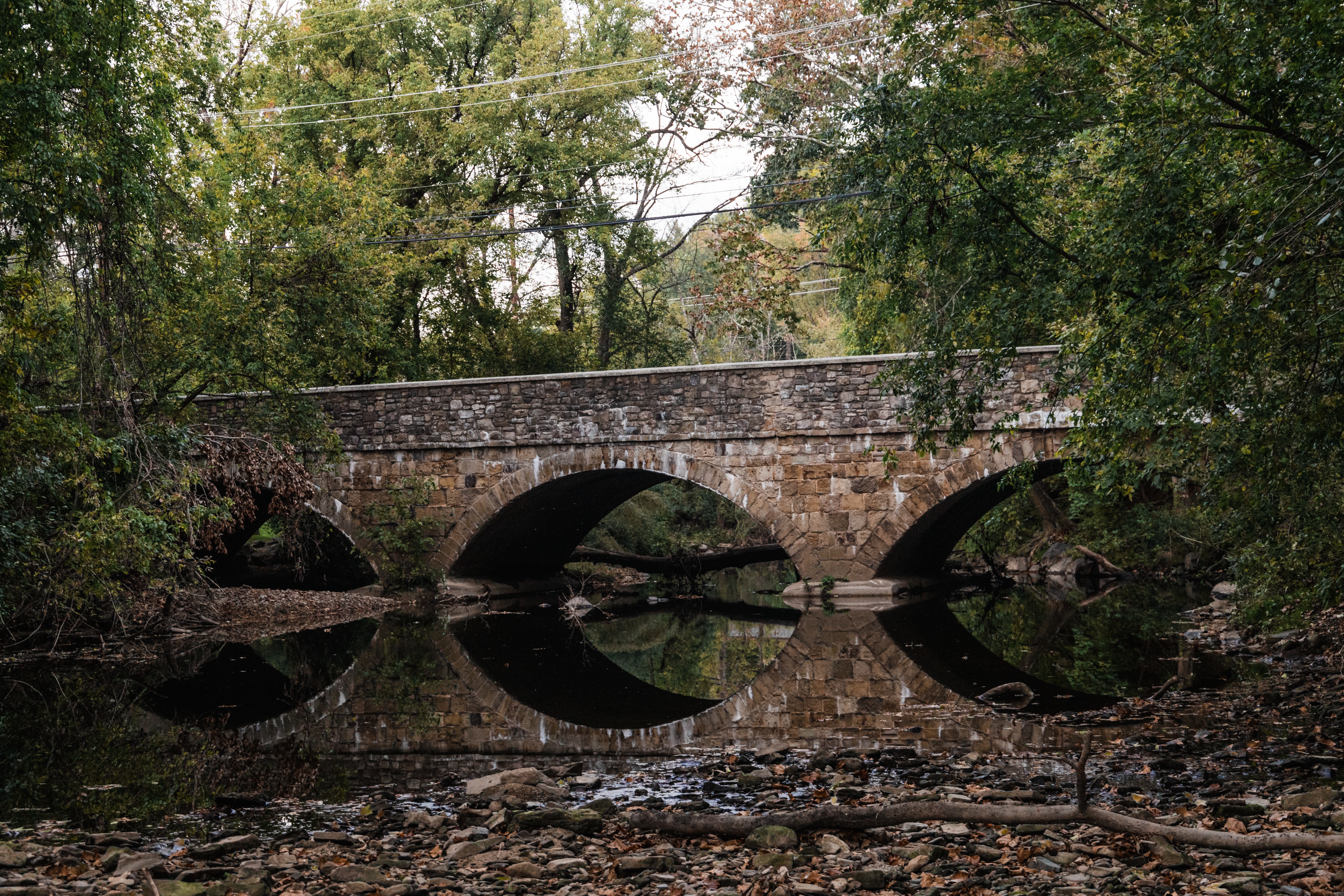
- County Bridge No. 54

- Location within Pennsylvania Location within the United States
- Location: Morris Road over a branch of Wissahickon Creek, near Prospectville, Whitemarsh Township, Pennsylvania
- Coordinates: 40°8′22″N 75°13′1″W
- Area: less than one acre
- Built: 1841, 1916
- Architectural style: Multi-span stone arch
- MPS: Highway Bridges Owned by the Commonwealth of Pennsylvania, Department of Transportation TR
- NRHP reference No.: 88000837
- Added to NRHP: June 22, 1988

County Bridge No. 54 is a historic stone arch bridge located near Prospectville in Whitemarsh Township, Montgomery County, Pennsylvania. The bridge was built in 1841 and rebuilt in 1916. It has three 28-foot-long (8.5 m) spans with an overall length of 125-foot (38 m). The bridge crosses a branch of Wissahickon Creek.

It was listed on the National Register of Historic Places in 1988.
