= Mount Joy (Whitemarsh, Pennsylvania) =

Historic house in Pennsylvania, United States

- U.S. National Register of Historic Places
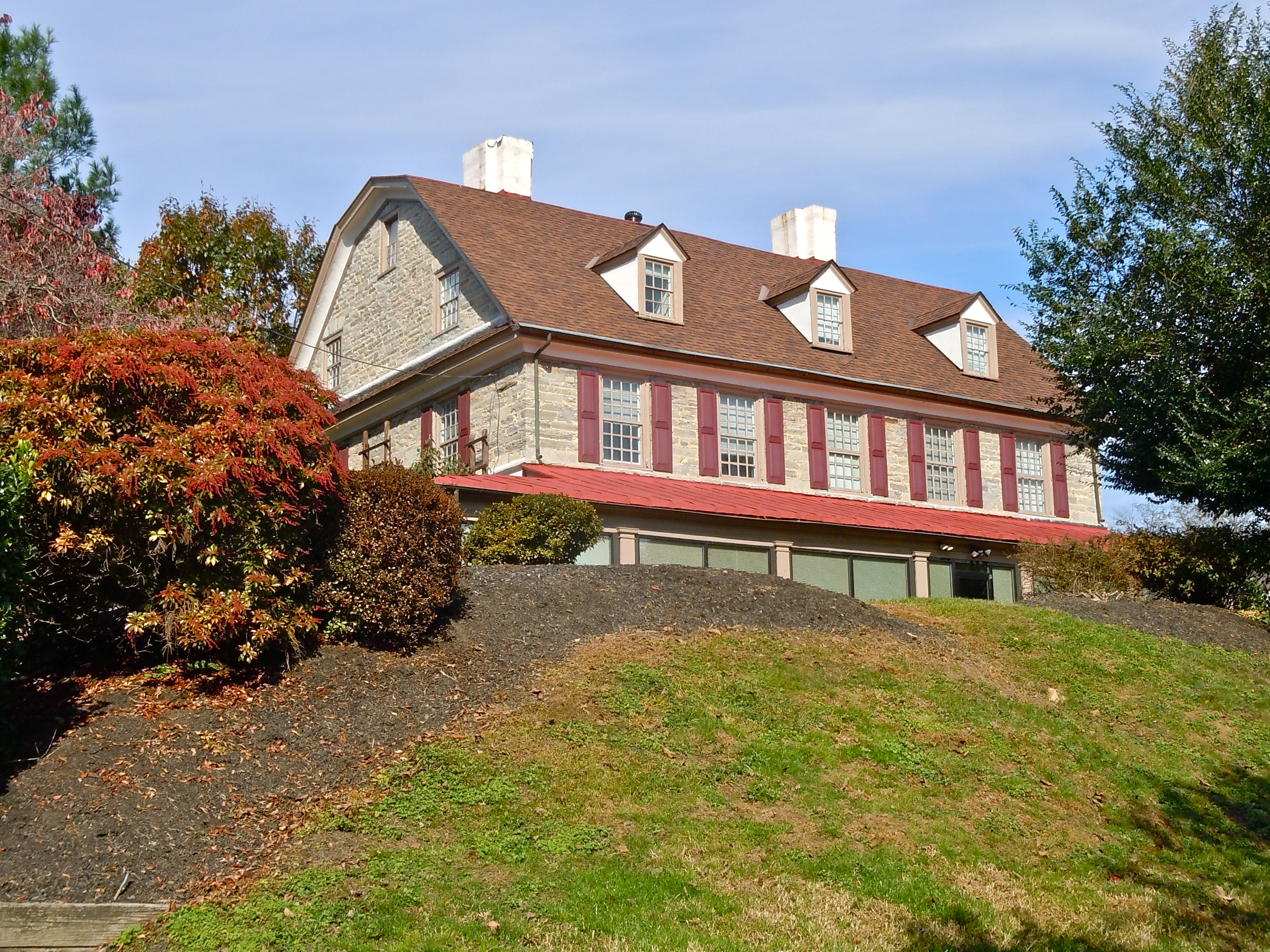
- Mount Joy, November 2011

- Location within Pennsylvania Location within the United States
- Location: North Lane and East Hector Street, Whitemarsh, Pennsylvania
- Coordinates: 40°4′36″N 75°17′12″W
- Area: 1.9 acres (0.77 ha)
- Built: c. 1735
- NRHP reference No.: 71000712
- Added to NRHP: March 11, 1971

Mount Joy, also known as the Peter Legaux Mansion, is an historic house in the Spring Mill section of Whitemarsh Township, Montgomery County, Pennsylvania, United States.

It was added to the National Register of Historic Places in 1971.

== History and architectural features ==
Built circa 1735 by Anthony Morris for his son John, this historic structure is a 2 1/2-story, five-bay, stone dwelling with a gambrel roof. It has ten fireplaces, some with iron firebacks.

Peter Legaux was the owner of "Spring Mill," a nearby gristmill that was in operation by 1704. The mill burned in 1967, and its stone ruins were demolished. Legaux also started the Pennsylvania Vine Company—which would become the first commercial vineyard in the US—on this property.

Mount Joy was added to the National Register of Historic Places in 1971.
