= Whitpain Public School =

- U.S. National Register of Historic Places
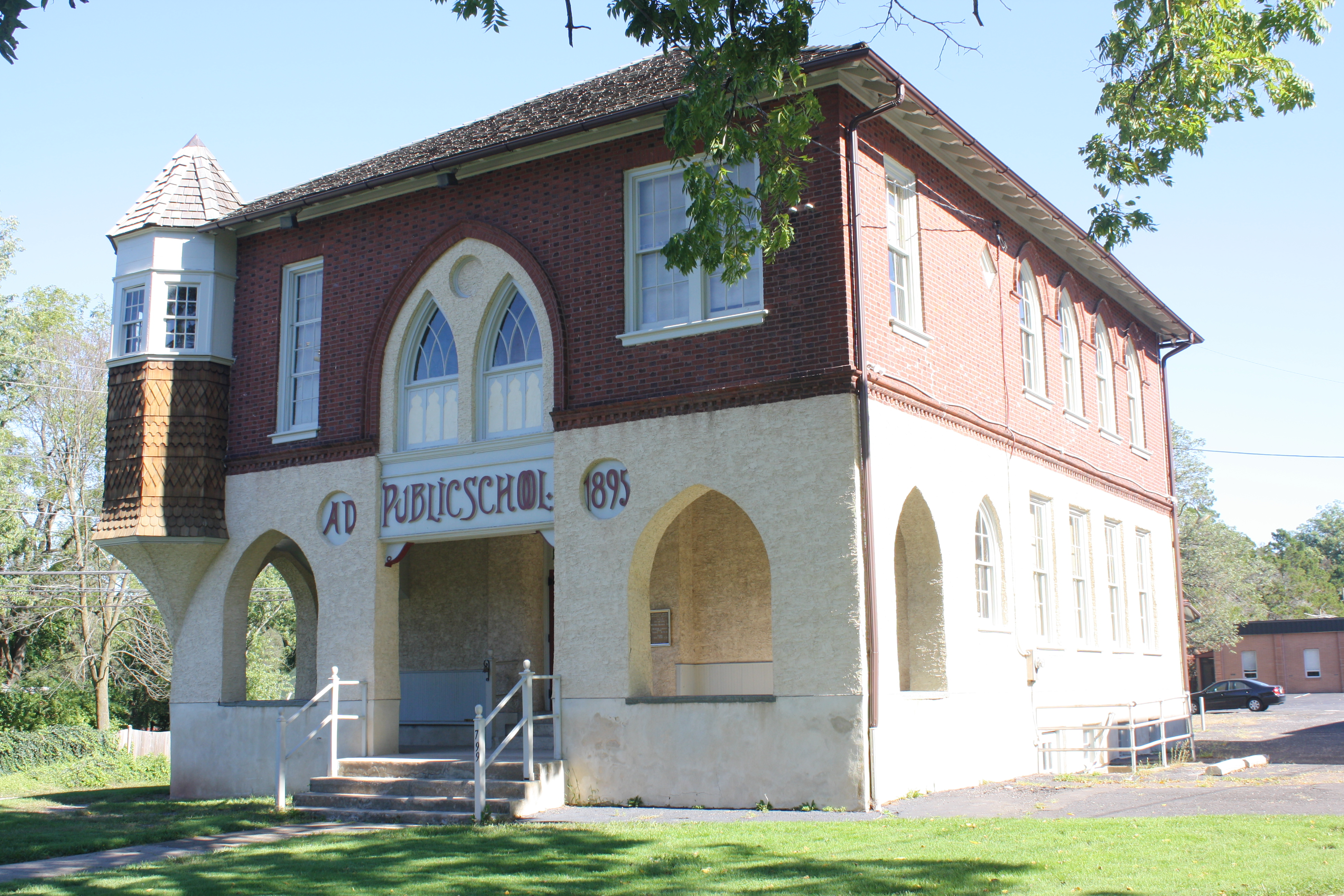
- Whitpain Public School, September 2012

- Location within Pennsylvania Location within the United States
- Location: 799 Skippack Pike, Blue Bell, Pennsylvania
- Coordinates: 40°9′27″N 75°16′27″W
- Area: less than one acre
- Built: 1895
- Architect: Baker, Victor H.; Shaeff Jr., Walter
- Architectural style: Late Victorian, Gothic, et al.
- NRHP reference No.: 06001150
- Added to NRHP: December 20, 2006

Whitpain Public School, also known as Whitpain High School and the 1895 School, is a historic school building located in Blue Bell, Montgomery County, Pennsylvania. It was built in 1895, and is a two-story, stucco covered stone and brick building. It is in a Late Victorian style with Queen Anne and Gothic Revival style details. It measures 37 feet wide by 50 feet deep, and sits on a fieldstone foundation. It features an entrance porch and numerous Gothic arches.

It was added to the National Register of Historic Places in 2006.
