= Regis de Ramel =

Regis A. de Ramel
- Born: August 20, 1974 (age 52); Alès, France
- Education: Washington College [B.A.]

Regis Antonin de Ramel (born August 20, 1974) is an aviation business owner and philanthropist. He is the owner of an aircraft management, maintenance, charter and flight training services company with locations in Wilmington, Delaware (ILG); Blue Bell, Pennsylvania (LOM); Lancaster, Pennsylvania (LNS); Winchester, Virginia [KOKV]; and Allentown, Queen City Municipal (KXLL). All four are marketed under the unifying brand of flyADVANCED.

His great-great-grandfather was two-term Mayor of Boston Frederick O. Prince, who oversaw improvements to the city's sewer and park systems. He was also a key figure in the construction of the Boston Public Library and a lineal descendant of the French philosopher Montesquieu. Great-grandfather Frederick H. Prince was a successful businessman, who made his fortune through investments in a variety of business ventures, including the Union Stockyards and Transit Company of which he served as chairman. Frederick H. Prince's son, Norman Prince, founded and then flew with the all-American Lafayette Escadrille in World War I. To form the squadron, he fought the isolationist attitudes of America, the French military fearful of spies and even the wishes of his own father, who pressed Norman into attending law school at Harvard. Norman Prince died while serving the Lafayette Escadrille in 1916. Great-grandfather Frederick Henry Prince, Jr. also joined and flew for the Escadrille.

De Ramel earned his bachelor's degree in economics from Washington College, Maryland. He earned his private pilot license at the age of nineteen. De Ramel married Sofia de Ramel in 2021; they share six children together.

== Professional career ==
de Ramel began his career at CMD Investors, Inc., a division of F. H. Prince & Co., a company which developed the first master-planned office park in the country. Moving back to Newport, Rhode Island, he founded Air Newport, an air-taxi business. In 2003, he sold Air Newport and joined Cirrus Aircraft as Regional Sales Director, covering the Mid-Atlantic region. In 2007, he left the position at Cirrus to form the partnership Stratus Alliance, an aggregation charter operation for Cirrus owners aimed at business travelers. In 2009 he purchased the assets of Advanced Aircraft at the Lancaster Airport in Lititz, Pennsylvania and formed Advanced Lancaster LLP.

In 2011, de Ramel won the contract to manage all operations of Wings Field in Blue Bell PA. The location provides flight lessons, flight charters, fuel, hangar space and aircraft maintenance and management for light jet and prop aircraft.

In 2013, de Ramel repurchased Air Newport which operates as an air taxi service under flyADVANCED.

In April 2014, he took over Aero Ways Inc. in Wilmington Delaware, offering worldwide jet charter, executive and corporate flight management, maintenance repairs (MRO) and Fixed-Base Operations (FBO) services, as well as aircraft sales. The location that was founded in 1997 and is the only CAA-certified FBO on the airfield.

In 2015, the three locations began the process of merging under a single brand, flyADVANCED Aviation Group. The location in Wilmington, DE (ILG) provides full service executive aircraft management services for both jet and prop aircraft. The Blue Bell Wings Field location (LOM) offers full executive and corporate management services for light jet and prop aircraft. The Lancaster Airport location serves exclusively as an aircraft service center.

flyADVANCED has three (3) Cirrus Aircraft Authorized Service Centers (ASC)and a Platinum Training Center. It is the largest Cirrus Authorized Service Center in the United States.

== Philanthropy ==
In 2010, the de Ramel family donated $15 million to Rhode Island Hospital's Norman Prince Neuroscience Institute (“NPNI”), the largest gift in Rhode Island Hospital's history. The institute has been featured in Providence Business News and lauded by Lifespan CEO and President, Timothy Babineau, as having "an opportunity to create a world-class neurosciences program here in Rhode Island.

de Ramel has served on the board of F. H. Prince & Co. He currently serves on the boards of: The Tower Hill School in Wilmington, DE; The Intercollegiate Studies Institute in Wilmington, DE; and the Stratus Foundation, created from the Prince Charitable Foundations in 2006. He previously served on the boards of Washington College, Chestertown, MD; Gould Academy and Oliver Hazard Perry Rhode Island (OHPRI) Education at Sea.
