= Wings Field =

Coordinates: 40°08′15″N 075°15′54″W

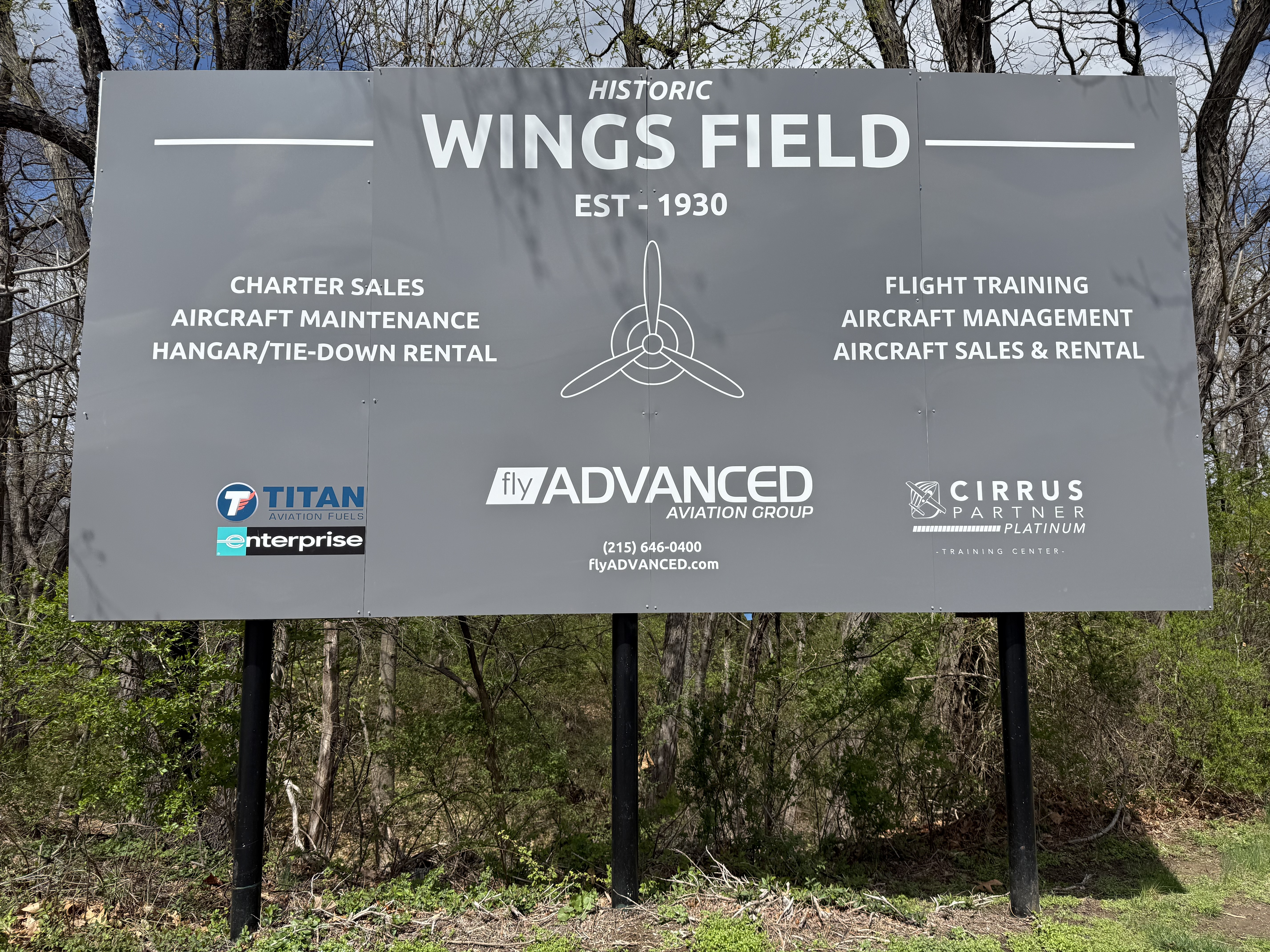
- IATA: BBX; ICAO: KLOM; FAA LID: LOM

Summary
- Airport type: Public
- Owner: Wings Field Preservation Assoc.
- Operator: flyADVANCED/flyGATEWAY
- Serves: Philadelphia
- Location: Blue Bell, Whitpain Township, Montgomery County, Pennsylvania
- Elevation AMSL: 302 ft / 92 m
- Website: www.flyadvanced.com

Map
- Location of airport in Pennsylvania LOM (the United States)

Runways
Direction	Length		Surface
Direction	ft	m	Surface
6/24	3,700	1,127	Asphalt

Statistics (2014)
- Aircraft operations: 36,500
- Based aircraft: 111
- Source: Federal Aviation Administration

Wings Field (IATA: BBX, ICAO: KLOM, FAA LID: LOM) is a general aviation airport in the Blue Bell section of Whitpain Township in Montgomery County, Pennsylvania, serving the western and northern Philadelphia suburbs. The airport was founded in 1928. It is located about three miles (5 km) northwest of the Philadelphia city limits.

== History ==
In May 1930, John Story Smith and Jack Bartow Founded "Wings Port". On 24 April 1932, The Philadelphia Aviation Country Club was founded at the field. The country club was the location of meetings of members that eventually founded the worldwide Aircraft Owners and Pilots Association in 1939.

In 2011, investor and aviation business owner Regis de Ramel was awarded the contract to manage all operations of Wings Field through his company flyADVANCED. The field currently provides flight lessons, flight charters, fuel, hangar space and aircraft management for light jet and prop aircraft.

== Facilities ==
Wings Field covers 217 acres (88 ha) and has one asphalt runway, 6/24, 3,700 ft × 75 ft (1,128 m × 23 m). In the year ending December 31, 2014, the airport had approximately 36,500 aircraft operations, an average of 100 per day: 83% general aviation, 17% air taxi and <1% military. 111 aircraft are based at this airport: 90% single-engine, 9% multi-engine, <1% jet and <1% helicopter.

The Fixed-Base Operator (FBO) on site is FlyAdvanced which was founded in 2011.

flyGATEWAY is the flight school on the field; it has a Part 141 career-focused flight school with multiple locations in PA & DE, along with a Cirrus Certified Platinum Training Center.

== Ground Transportation ==
=== Road ===
Wings Field has road access from the Norristown interchange of the Pennsylvania Turnpike (I-276) in Plymouth Meeting.

== Bus ==
SEPTA's Route 95 bus provides service to Willow Grove, Plymouth Meeting, and Gulph Mills, from a stop at the intersection of Norristown Road, Narcissa Road, and Stenton Avenue.

=== Rental cars ===
Rental cars are available via reservation through Enterprise. Additionally, a Chrysler Pacifica crew car is also available for transient pilots on a first-come, first-served basis for short-term use within the 10-mile area.

== Past airlines ==
Wings Airways was a commuter airline based at Wings Field. Its main route was the short hop to Philadelphia International Airport, a flight of less than 15 minutes. From the late 1970s to the late 1980s, Wings Airways operated a shuttle between Wings Field and PHL with up to 22 round trip flights on weekdays and flew nonstop to New York City JFK Airport at one point. The airline used Britten-Norman Islanders, Britten-Norman Trislanders and de Havilland Canada DHC-6 Twin Otters.

== Aircraft Boneyard ==
Wings Field has an on-site boneyard for derelict aircraft behind the upper hangars. This area is reserved for use as a storage location for damaged aircraft. Aircraft deemed a total loss by insurance companies awaiting transport are stored at this site. Additionally, this location serves as a storage location for abandoned aircraft.

== See also ==
- List of airports in Pennsylvania
- Wings Airways
