= Dawesfield =

Historic house in Pennsylvania, United States

- U.S. National Register of Historic Places
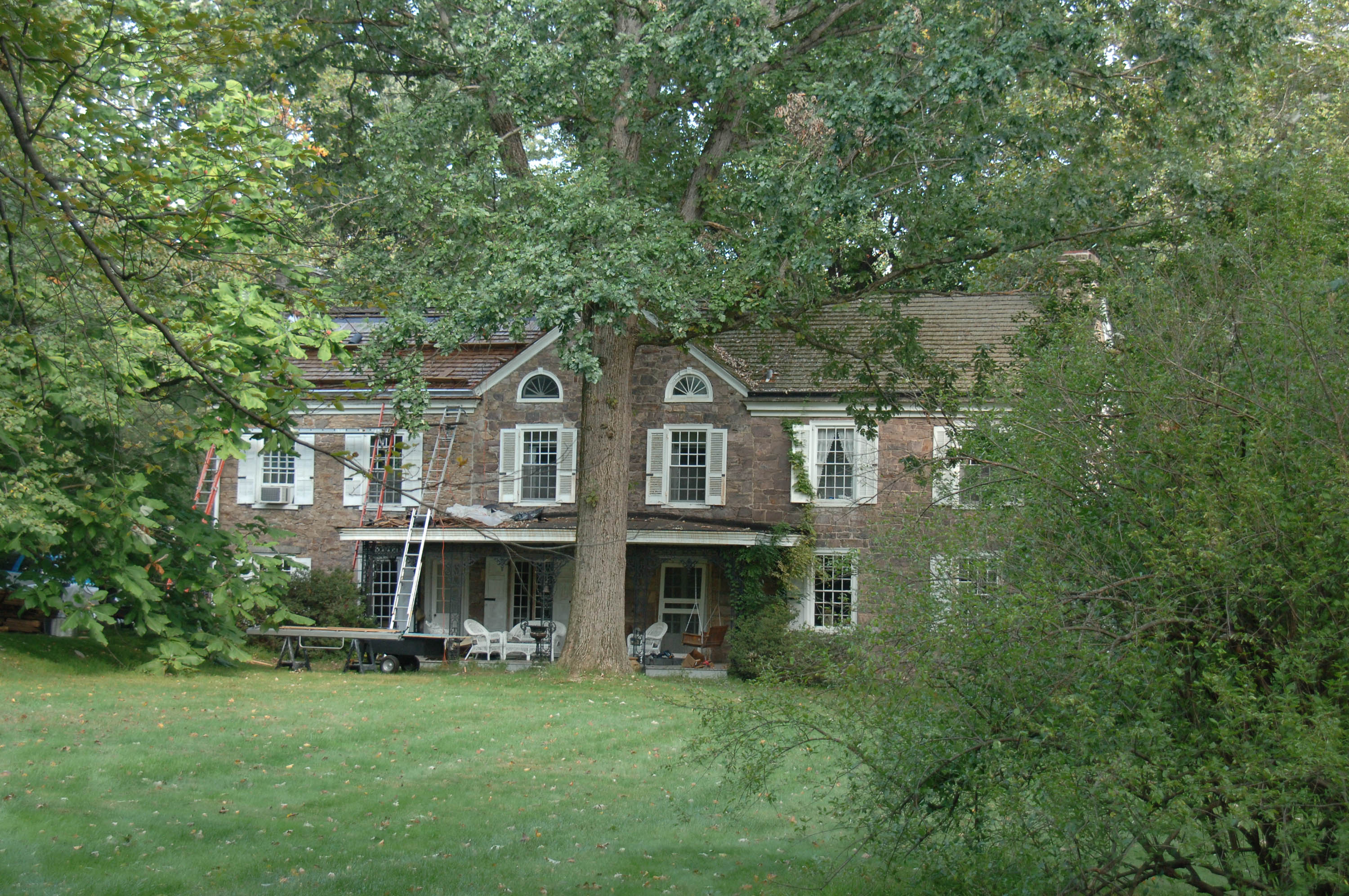

- Location within Pennsylvania Location within the United States
- Location: 565 Lewis Ln., Ambler, Whitpain Township, Pennsylvania
- Coordinates: 40°9′12″N 75°14′53″W
- Area: 11.2 acres (4.5 ha)
- Built: 1736
- Architect: Willing, Charles
- Architectural style: Colonial Revival, Federal
- NRHP reference No.: 91000318
- Added to NRHP: March 29, 1991

Dawesfield, also known as Camp Morris, is an historic country house estate located in Ambler in Whitpain Township, Montgomery County, Pennsylvania. The property has eleven contributing buildings, one contributing site, and one contributing structure. They include the two-and-one-half-story, stone main dwelling (c. 1736–1870), stone barn (1795, 1937), stone tenant house (1845), frame farm manager's house (1884), and eight stone-and-frame outbuildings (1736-1952). The property features landscaped grounds, a stone wall, and terraced lawns.

It was added to the National Register of Historic Places in 1991.

== History and features ==
Dawesfield, which belonged to James Morris, served as General George Washington's headquarters after the Battle of Germantown from October 20 to November 2, 1777.

== Gallery ==
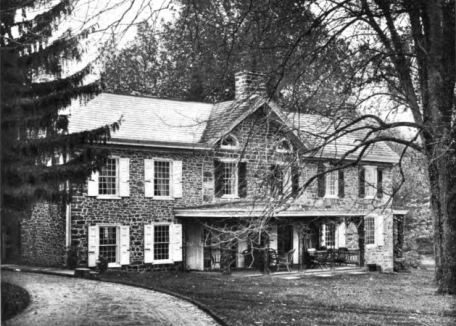
Dawesfield House, ca. 1908

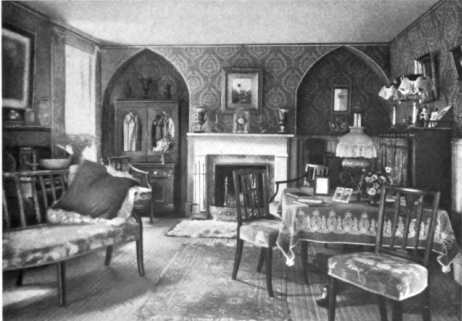
The North Parlor

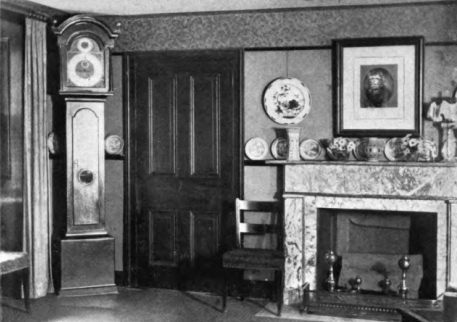
The Dining Room

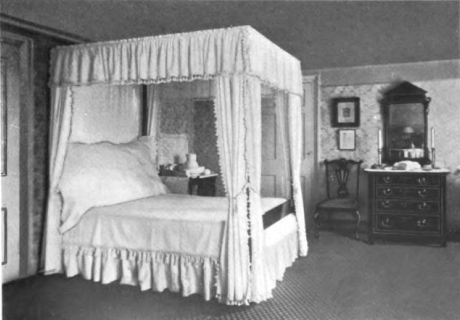
Bedroom used by George Washington

== See also ==
- List of Washington's Headquarters during the Revolutionary War
