= Clifton House, Pennsylvania =

Historic building in Fort Washington, Pennsylvania

Coordinates: 40°07′59″N 75°12′51″W

Clifton House, previously known as Sandy Tavern, is a historic building located at 473 Bethlehem Pike in Fort Washington, Pennsylvania.

During the autumn of 1777, George Washington's Continental Army spent six weeks camped at nearby Whitemarsh. Colonels Clement Biddle (the "Quaker General" and member of one of Philadelphia's prominent families) and Stephen Moylan, and General George Wheedon, were quartered here during the encampment.

The house that currently stands on the property was built in 1801. At the time of the American Revolution, it was known as the Sandy Tavern.

Today, the Clifton House is a library and museum operated by the Fort Washington Historical Society, and also serves as the society's headquarters.

== See also ==
- Hope Lodge

== Sources ==
- Federal Writers' Project (1940). Pennsylvania: A Guide to the Keystone State. US History Publishers. ISBN 9781603540377.
