= Blue Bell, Pennsylvania =

Unincorporated community in Pennsylvania, US

Blue Bell
- Census-designated place
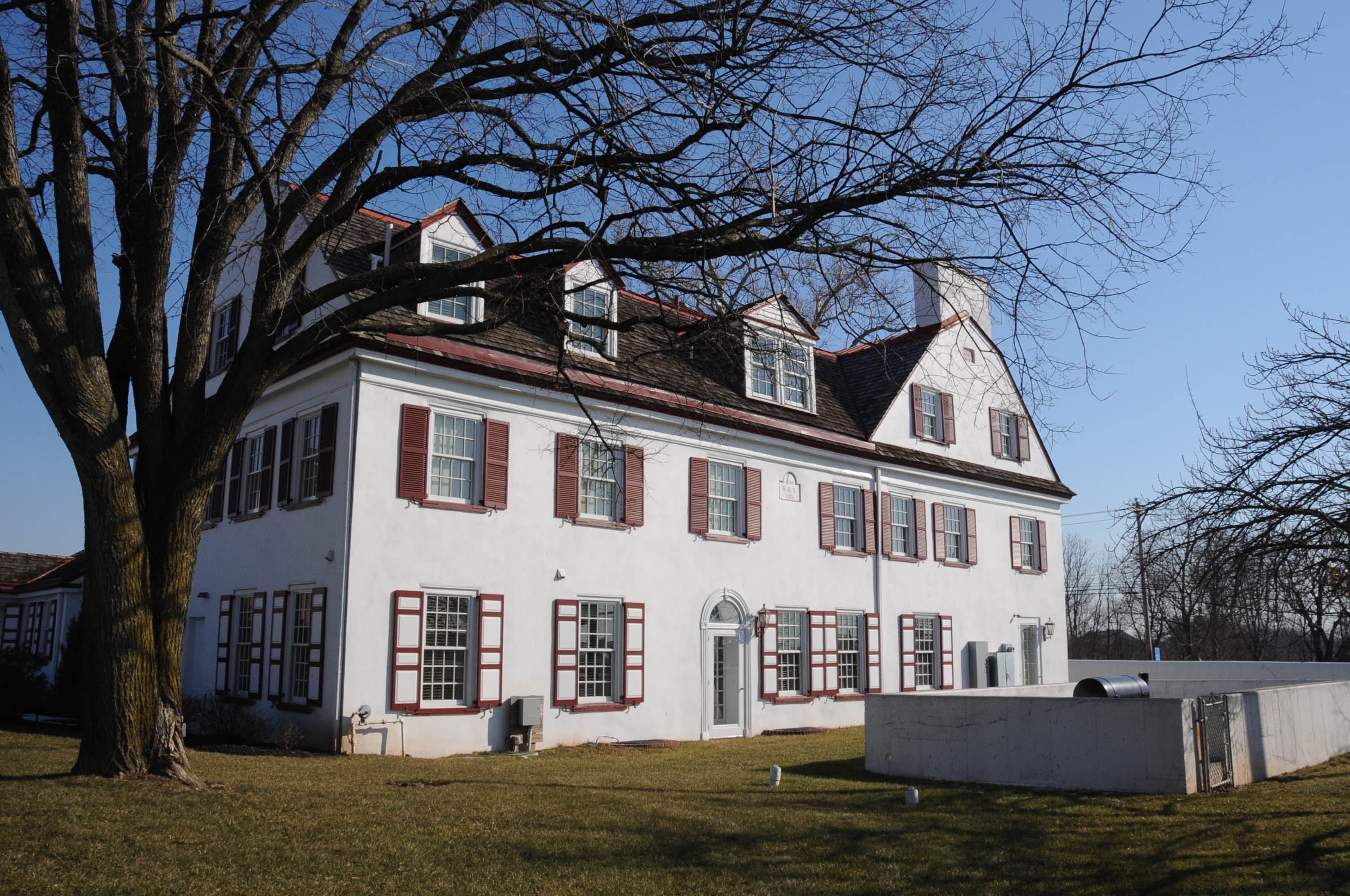
- Normandy Farmstead

- Location of Blue Bell in Pennsylvania Blue Bell (the United States)
- Coordinates: 40°08′41″N 75°16′08″W
- Country: United States
- State: Pennsylvania
- County: Montgomery
- Township: Whitpain

Area
  - Total: 5.39 sq mi (13.96 km^{2})
  - Land: 5.39 sq mi (13.96 km^{2})
  - Water: 0 sq mi (0.00 km^{2})
- Elevation: 358 ft (109 m)

Population (2020)
  - Total: 6,506
  - Density: 1,207/sq mi (466.1/km^{2})
- Time zone: UTC-5 (EST)
  - Summer (DST): UTC-4 (EDT)
- ZIP code: 19422
- Area codes: 215/267/445, 610/484
- FIPS code: 42-07224

Blue Bell is a census-designated place (CDP) in Whitpain Township, Pennsylvania, United States. As of the 2020 census, its population was 6,506.

Blue Bell was originally known as Pigeontown, after the large flocks of the now-extinct passenger pigeons that once gathered there. The town was renamed in 1840 after the historically prominent Blue Bell Inn.

Blue Bell is known for its large executive-style mansions, major business parks, community shopping facilities, and small businesses. It is one of the most affluent areas outside the Main Line communities in the Philadelphia area. In July 2005, Money magazine ranked Blue Bell 14th on its list of the "100 Best Places to Live in the United States".

== History ==
Whitpain Public School was added to the National Register of Historic Places in 2006. The “Dutchman” is a well-known historical landmark within the town of Blue Bell.

== Geography ==
Blue Bell is located at 40°8′41″N 75°16′8″W (40.144759, -75.268752). According to the United States Census Bureau, the CDP has a total area of 5.4 square miles (14 km^{2}), all land.

While the CDP of Blue Bell proper consists of an area roughly centered upon the namesake Inn, in recent years the name "Blue Bell" has become informally synonymous with the larger surrounding area within the 19422 ZIP code, including the communities of Center Square and Belfry.

The boundary between area codes 215/267/445 and 610/484 runs through Blue Bell's center.

== Demographics ==
Historical population
Census	Pop.	Note	%±
1990	6,091		—
2000	6,395		5.0%
2010	6,067		−5.1%
2020	6,506		7.2%

As of the 2000 census, there were 6,395 people, 1,424 households, and 1,827 families residing in the CDP. The population density was 1,183.0 inhabitants per square mile (456.8/km^{2}). There were 2,503 housing units at an average density of 463.0 per square mile (178.8/km^{2}). The racial makeup of the CDP was 90.32% White, 6.52% Asian, 2.42% African American, 0.02% Native American, 0.22% from other races, and 0.50% from two or more races. Hispanic or Latino of any race were 1.14% of the population.

There were 1,434 households, of which 32.0% had children under the age of 18 living with them, 68.2% were married couples living together, 5.7% had a female householder with no husband present, and 24.9% were non-families. 20.8% of all households were made up of individuals, and 8.6% had someone living alone who was 65 years of age or older. The average household size was 2.60 and the average family size was 3.03.

In the CDP, the population was spread out, with 23.8% under the age of 18, 4.7% from 18 to 24, 24.9% from 25 to 44, 29.5% from 45 to 64, and 17.0% who were 65 years of age or older. The median age was 43 years. For every 100 females, there were 94.0 males. For every 100 females age 18 and over, there were 90.2 males.

The median income for a household in the CDP was $106,617, and the median income for a family was $115,541. Males had a median income of $75,462 versus $50,481 for females. The per capita income for the CDP was $43,813. About 1.8% of families and 2.8% of the population were below the poverty line, including 2.1% of those under age 18 and 1.5% of those age 65 or over.

For the population which consists of peoples 25 years and older; 95.6% of residents have a high school diploma or higher, 61.7% have their bachelor's degree or higher, and 23.5% have their graduate or professional degree.

== Economy ==
Blue Bell is home to the global headquarters of Unisys, a provider of information technology services and products. Aetna, an insurance provider, also maintains an office in Blue Bell. UniTek Global Services, an international telecommunications, cable and satellite services company, is headquartered in Blue Bell. It is also home to the Montgomery County Community College, Wings Field Airport, Bluestone Country Club, and Blue Bell Country Club, boasting an 18-hole Arnold Palmer Signature golf course.

The most common industries for men in Blue Bell include professional, scientific, and technical services (18%), finance and insurance (10%), health care (7%), real estate and rental and leasing (6%), construction (5%), chemicals (5%), and educational services (4%). The most common industries for women in Blue Bell include professional, scientific and technical services (11%), educational services (11%), finance and insurance (7%), chemicals (5%), real estate and rental and leasing (4%), and accommodation and food services (3%).

The nearest major shopping malls are the Montgomery Mall in North Wales, the Plymouth Meeting Mall in Plymouth Meeting, and the King of Prussia Mall in King of Prussia.

== Education ==
Blue Bell is part of the Wissahickon School District which was ranked ninth, in September 2016, by Patch.com's "50 Best Places to Teach in Pennsylvania." There is also one institution of higher education in Blue Bell, the main campus of Montgomery County Community College.

== Notable people ==
- Joe Farrell (born 1994), soccer player

== See also ==
- Meadowlands Country Club
