= Whitpain Township, Pennsylvania =

Township in Pennsylvania, United States

Whitpain Township
- Township
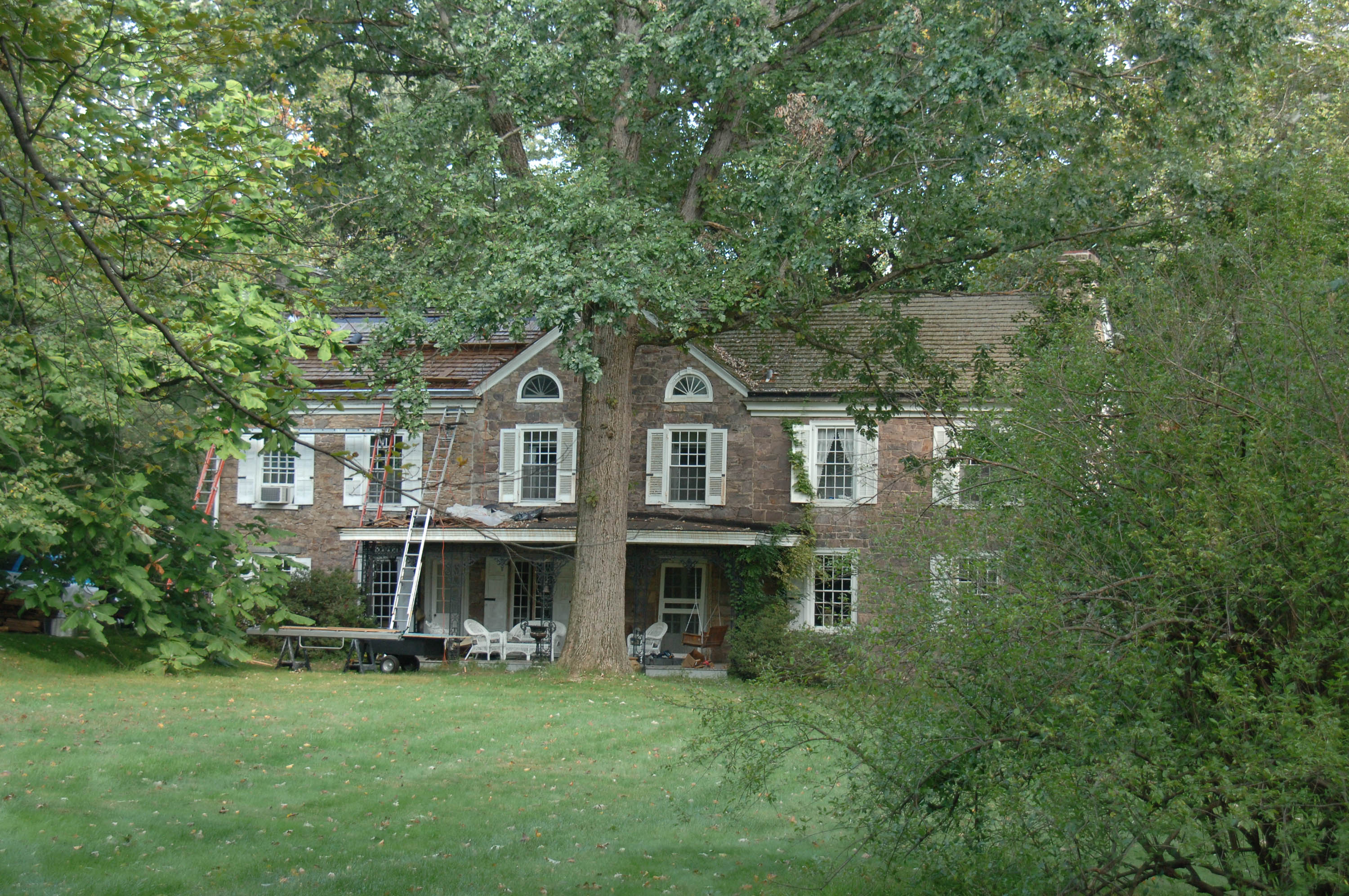
- Dawesfield

- Flag Seal

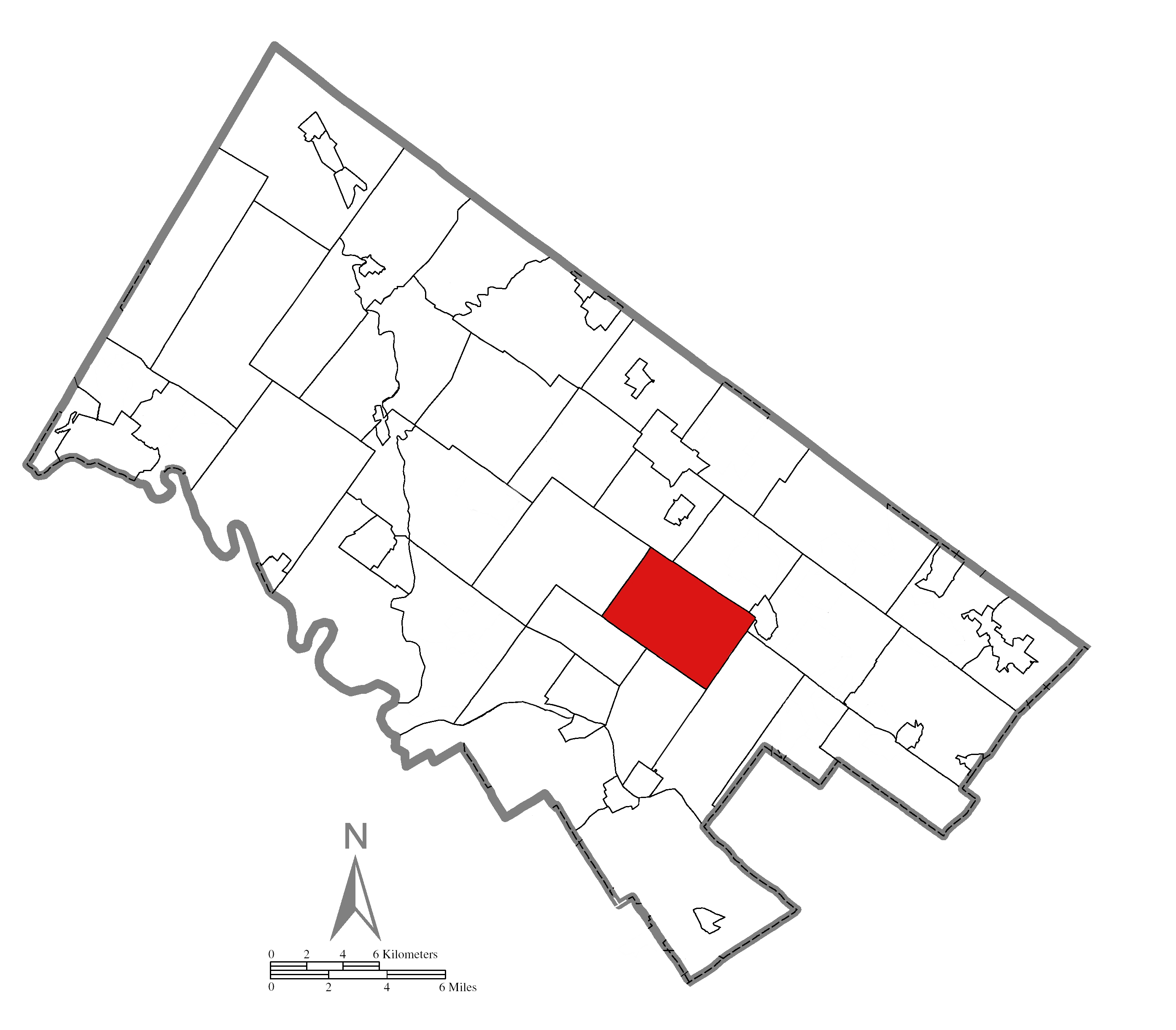
- Location in Montgomery County, Pennsylvania
- Coordinates: 40°09′21″N 75°17′02″W
- Country: United States
- State: Pennsylvania
- County: Montgomery

Area
  - Total: 12.86 sq mi (33.3 km^{2})
  - Land: 12.85 sq mi (33.3 km^{2})
  - Water: 0.01 sq mi (0.026 km^{2})
- Elevation: 259 ft (79 m)

Population (2010)
  - Total: 18,875
  - Estimate (2016): 19,308
  - Density: 1,469/sq mi (567.1/km^{2})
- Time zone: UTC-5 (EST)
  - Summer (DST): UTC-4 (EDT)
- Area codes: 610, 484
- FIPS code: 42-091-84888
- Website: whitpaintownship.org

Whitpain Township is a township in Montgomery County, Pennsylvania, United States. Founded in 1701, it has grown to a total population of 20,333 as of the 2020 census.

== Geography ==
According to the United States Census Bureau, the township has a total area of 12.9 square miles (33 km^{2}), of which 0.08% is water. Whitpain Township is approximately four and a half miles by three miles. There are two watersheds in the township, Wissahickon Creek (which was once known as "Whitpaine's Creek") and Stony Creek.

== Demographics ==
Historical population
Census	Pop.	Note	%±
1930	2,328		—
1940	2,451		5.3%
1950	3,063		25.0%
1960	7,331		139.3%
1970	9,245		26.1%
1980	11,772		27.3%
1990	15,673		33.1%
2000	18,562		18.4%
2010	18,875		1.7%
2020	20,333		7.7%
U.S. Decennial Census

As of the 2010 census, the township was 80.0% White, 5.2% Black or African American, 0.1% Native American, 10.9% Asian, and 1.3% were two or more races. 2.6% of the population were of Hispanic or Latino ancestry.

As of the census of 2000, there were 18,562 people, 6,960 households, and 5,206 families residing in the township. The population density was 1,436.3 inhabitants per square mile (554.6/km^{2}). There were 7,305 housing units at an average density of 565.3 per square mile (218.3/km^{2}). The racial makeup of the township was 86.31% White, 4.69% African American, 0.06% Native American, 7.82% Asian, 0.23% from other races, and 0.89% from two or more races. Hispanic or Latino of any race were 1.33% of the population.

There were 6,960 households, out of which 34.0% had children under the age of 18 living with them, 66.3% were married couples living together, 6.5% had a female householder with no husband present, and 25.2% were non-families. 21.3% of all households were made up of individuals, and 9.2% had someone living alone who was 65 years of age or older. The average household size was 2.64 and the average family size was 3.10.

In the township the population was spread out, with 25.0% under the age of 18, 5.1% from 18 to 24, 27.0% from 25 to 44, 27.9% from 45 to 64, and 14.9% who were 65 years of age or older. The median age was 41 years. For every 100 females, there were 93.1 males. For every 100 females age 18 and over, there were 89.2 males.

The median income for a household in the township was $88,933, and the median income for a family was $103,613. Males had a median income of $68,125 versus $44,079 for females. The per capita income for the township was $41,739. About 1.7% of families and 3.1% of the population were below the poverty line, including 3.7% of those under age 18 and 3.3% of those age 65 or over.

== History ==
Whitpain is one of the oldest townships in Montgomery County. Richard Whitpaine, a London butcher, purchased a 4,500-acre (1,800 ha) tract of land as part of William Penn’s "Holy Experiment". His 16-year-old son, Zechariah, travelled to Pennsylvania on the ship Welcome with Penn in 1682 to settle his father's properties and escape persecution of his Quaker beliefs. By 1685, Zechariah had established a plantation house along Wissahickon Creek near Mount Pleasant, with his bride Sarah Songhurst, whom he had met on the Welcome.

In Holme's Map of 1681, Whitpain Township is called "Whitpain's Creek". Whitpain Township has been an independent township since 1701, as it appears as "Whitpain's Township" in the survey of all the townships in the Commonwealth ordered by William Penn. The borders of Whitpain Township changed dramatically in 1733, when Worcester Township was created, taking away a significant portion of its area. For a brief period in 1762, Whitpain and Plymouth Township, by act of the Assembly, became one district with one supervisor from each township. Dissatisfaction by the populace of both townships led the Assembly to repeal the act in 1763.

By 1734, Whitpain Township had 24 landowners. It maintained steady growth for more than two centuries, expanding from 771 people in 1800 to 3,063 people in 1950. In recent years, the township has experienced rapid growth. Today, Whitpain Township is home to over 18,000 residents.

Early settlers to Whitpain Township were farmers. Industry came to the region in 1727, when Jacob Yost began a weaving enterprise in Centre Square. Charles Mather built an additional mill in 1804. Although a rural farming community for decades, the growth of recent years has included business development, making Whitpain Township home to several of the Philadelphia region's largest corporations, including Aetna US Healthcare and Unisys.

Although today Whitpain Township is home to residents of many religions and nationalities, its earliest settlers were Protestant and Quaker. Prior to the Revolutionary War, the township had two churches: Boehm's Reformed Church (circa 1740), and St. John's Lutheran Church (circa 1769).

Whitpain Township earned a place in history during the Revolutionary War, when George Washington and many of his generals spent time in the township. Dawesfield, a home on Lewis Lane, is considered the most significant historic site in the township because it was Washington's headquarters from October 21 to November 2, 1777. Dawesfield was listed on the National Register of Historic Places in 1991.

=== Communities within Whitpain Township ===
Today, Whitpain Township is a composite of several small communities established before and after the Revolutionary War. They include West Ambler, Center Square, Blue Bell, Broad Axe, Custer, Franklinville, Washington Square and Belfry.

Most of Whitpain Township is covered by the Blue Bell, Pennsylvania ZIP code. In recent years the name "Blue Bell" has become largely synonymous with much of the township, eclipsing many of the older community designations.

== Government ==
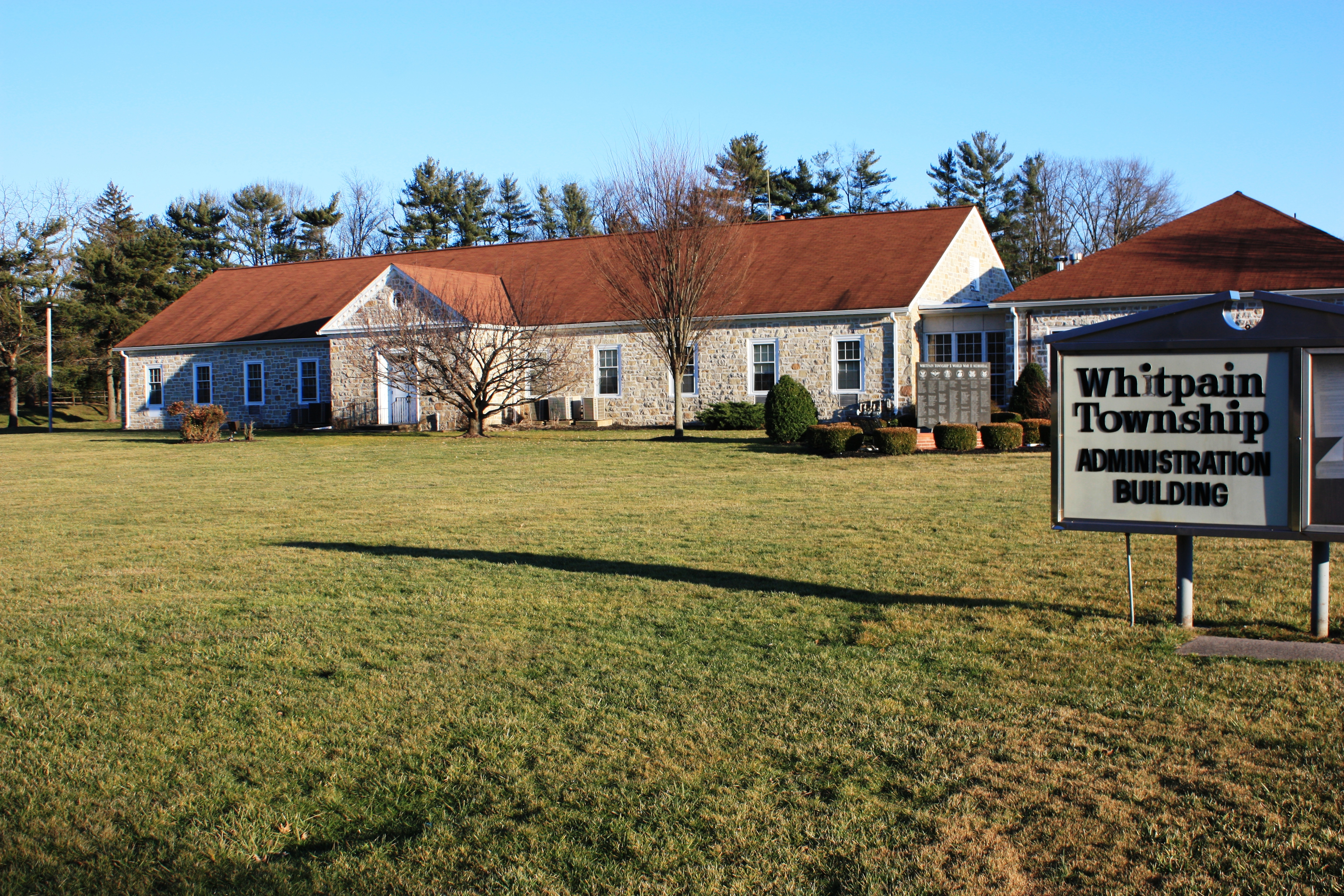
Whitpain Township municipal building

Presidential elections results
Year	Republican	Democratic
2020	34.9% 4,763	63.5% 8,660
2016	36.6% 4,306	59.2% 6,953
2012	47.8% 5,373	51.3% 5,760
2008	43.3% 4,855	56.2% 6,299
2004	48.4% 5,334	51.1% 5,631
2000	49.4% 4,842	48.6% 4,763
1996	49.4% 4,086	42.3% 3,501
1992	47.6% 3,953	35.5% 2,954

Under Pennsylvania law, Whitpain Township is a Township of the Second Class. It is governed by a five-member Board of Supervisors elected at-large by the electorate. Members of the Board of Supervisors serve six year terms. Every two years, two of the seats come up for election. The exception is in the sixth year in the cycle, when only one seat comes up for election.

Most, if not all, of the executive and legislative powers allocated to Whitpain Township in the State Second Class Township Code are vested in the Board of Supervisors. The Board of Supervisors is empowered to appoint professionals to assist it in the operation of the Township and to furnish advice and counsel on technical matters. Additionally, the Board appoints all the members of the various boards and commissions as well as the Zoning Hearing Board and the Planning Commission. Also, the Board of Supervisors hears conditional use applications in accordance with the Municipalities Planning Code and the Whitpain Township Zoning Ordinance. The levying of township taxes and the appropriations to the various departments and subsidiary boards and commissions is the responsibility of the Board of Supervisors. During the months of November and December, public hearings are held for the purpose of reviewing the budget for the following year.

The current membership of the Board of Supervisors (as of the election of November 2023) consists of:

- Scott Badami, Chair
- Kimberly J. Koch, Vice Chair
- Jeffrey Campolongo, Secretary
- Joyce Keller, Treasurer
- Sara Selverian, Assistant Secretary

The township government is located at 960 Wentz Road, Blue Bell, PA 19422.

Federally, Whitpain Township is part of the 4th Congressional District, represented by Democrat Madeleine Dean.

== Economy ==
Unisys and Kappa Publishing Group are headquartered in Blue Bell in Whitpain Township.

=== Top employers ===
According to Whitpain Township's 2022 Annual Comprehensive Financial Report, the top employers in the township are:

#	Employer	# of Employees
1	Henkels & McCoy Inc.	1,002
2	Montgomery County Community College	904
3	Pharmaceutical Research Associates	494
4	Aetna	402
5	Hansen Properties	356
6	ICON Clinical Research	349
7	Kencrest Services	332
8	Giant Food Stores	324
9	Siemens	288
10	United Biosource LLC	256

== Education ==
The Wissahickon School District provides public education to the children of Whitpain Township, as well as those from Lower Gwynedd Township and Ambler Borough. Within the township are three of the district's five elementary schools: Blue Bell Elementary School, Shady Grove Elementary School, and Stony Creek Elementary School. Wissahickon Middle School and Wissahickon High School are located outside of the township.

Also situated within the township is one college, Montgomery County Community College.

== Transportation ==
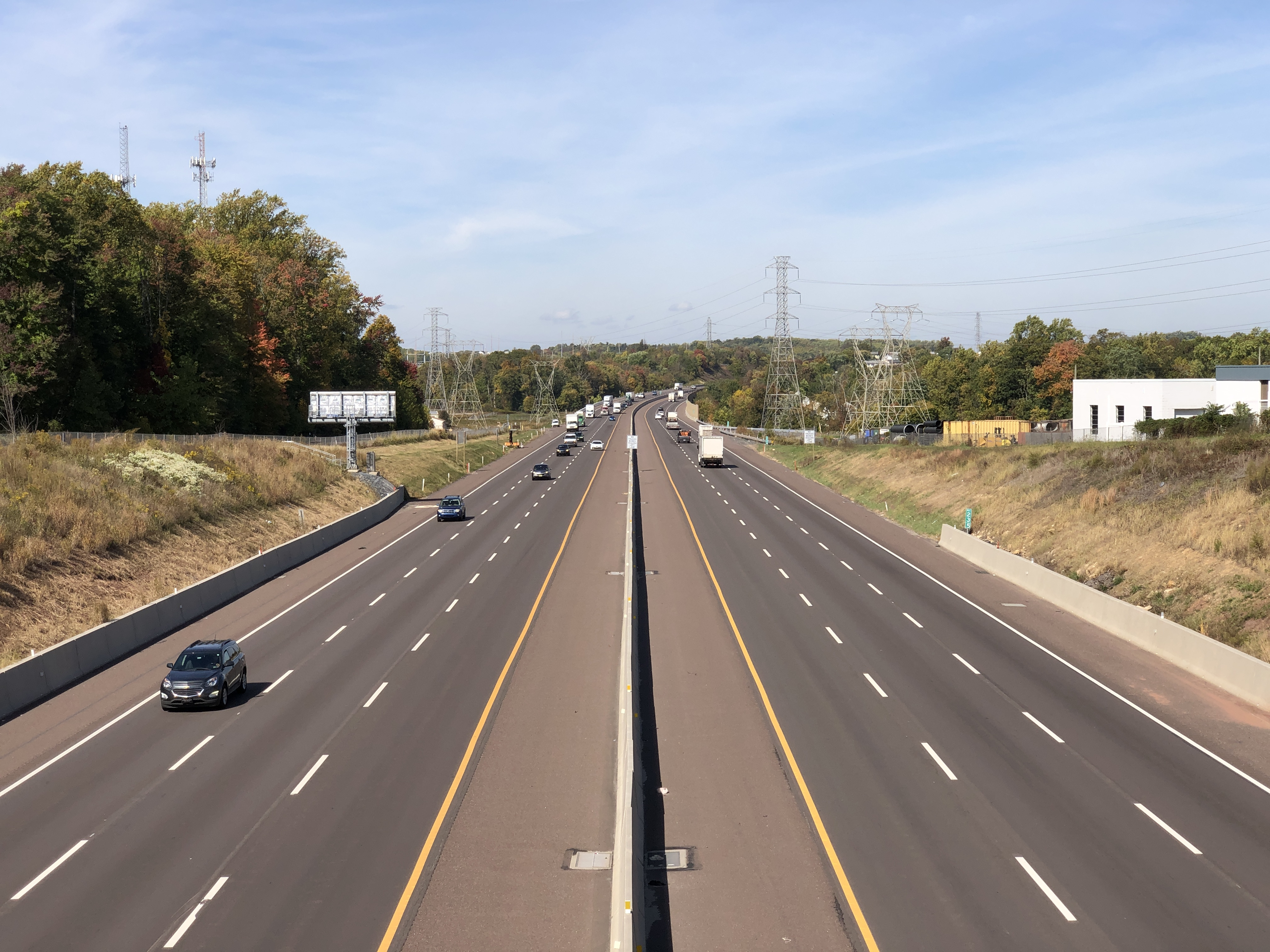
I-476/Pennsylvania Turnpike Northeast Extension northbound in Whitpain Township

As of 2021 there were 90.03 miles (144.89 km) of public roads in Whitpain Township, of which 3.00 miles (4.83 km) were maintained by the Pennsylvania Turnpike Commission (PTC), 19.02 miles (30.61 km) were maintained by the Pennsylvania Department of Transportation (PennDOT) and 68.01 miles (109.45 km) were maintained by the township.

The major roadways in Whitpain Township are U.S. Route 202 (DeKalb Pike) and Pennsylvania Route 73 (Skippack Pike). The two roadways intersect in Center Square. Both roads are mostly two-lane highways, though US 202 is currently under construction to become a four-lane divided highway throughout the township. Other key roads within the township include Penllyn-Blue Bell Pike and Walton Road. Butler Pike, North Wales Road, Township Line Road and Morris Road are all major roads that mainly form the boundaries of the township.

Interstate 476 (the Northeastern Extension of the Pennsylvania Turnpike) passes through the township but, as it has no interchanges within the township boundaries, is not directly accessible.

The township contains one airport, Wings Field. It is used for general aviation.

Several train lines cross the township. There are no active passenger train stations within the township borders, but several are located in neighboring municipalities, including North Wales and Ambler, which are both served by SEPTA Regional Rail's Lansdale/Doylestown Line. SEPTA provides Suburban Bus service to Whitpain Township along routes 94, 95, 96, and 98.

== Community associations ==
=== Whitpain Residents Organization ===
A community association known as WhitpainResidents was founded in 2006 as a non-profit group with the stated goal of promoting "responsible development and preserving the quality of life in Whitpain Township." The group rose to prominence through the vocal opposition to a planned hospital on grounds formerly occupied by Unisys.
