= Plymouth-Whitemarsh High School =

Public high school in Plymouth Meeting, Pennsylvania, United States

Plymouth Whitemarsh High School

Location
- 201 East Germantown Pike; Plymouth Meeting, (Montgomery County), Pennsylvania 19462; United States; 40°05′59″N 75°16′13″W

Information
- Type: Public high school
- School district: Colonial School District
- Principal: Jason Bacani
- Teaching staff: 108.50 (FTE)
- Grades: 9–12
- Gender: Co-educational
- Enrollment: 1,597 (2023–2024)
- Student to teacher ratio: 14.72
- Campus: Large Suburban
- Colors: Colonial Blue; Scarlet
- Athletics: PIAA District 1
- Athletics conference: Suburban One League
- Mascot: Colonials
- Publication: The Continental
- Newspaper: Town Crier
- Yearbook: Milestone
- Website: https://pw.colonialsd.org/

Plymouth Whitemarsh High School is a public high school in Plymouth Meeting, Pennsylvania, United States. It is part of the Colonial School District, and serves Plymouth Township, Whitemarsh Township, and the Borough of Conshohocken .

Plymouth Whitemarsh is accredited by the Middle States Association of Colleges and Schools. The curriculum is aligned with state and national standards and offers more than 200 courses, including 24 Advanced Placement (AP) courses audited by the College Board and more than 30 honors level courses. A technical education program is available through the Central Montco Technical High School.

== Sports and traditions ==
- Boys' basketball: Six District 1 championships and three state titles (1963, 1997 and 2010). PIAA AAAA players of the year: C.J. Aiken (2010) and Jaylen Bond (2011).
- Girls' basketball: 2017 Suburban One American champion (22–0 regular season, 14-0 conference), 2018 SOL American champion. 1985 PIAA AAAA state runner-up. 1983 District 1 AAA champions. 2022 Undefeated PIAA AAAAAA State Champions (perfect 34–0 season)
- Golf: PW won Suburban One American titles in 2007, 2008, and 2009.
- Boys' tennis: League championships in 2008 and 2009.
- Girls' tennis: Christina Keiser District 1 AAA champion in 2011, 2012 and 2013 and PIAA AAA state champion in 2012.
- Football: Suburban One American champions in 2005, 2011, 2012, 2013, 2016 and 2019. In the 1990s Plymouth Whitemarsh Football placed 8th in winning percentage in the state of Pennsylvania out of 563 High Schools with a record of 94–20–2, including seven league championships. In the early 1970s, the Colonials had a 33-game unbeaten streak.
- Bowling: 2006 Suburban One individual champion Chris Lawler. 2007 Suburban One individual champion Kevin Rexroth. 2010 Suburban One Continental/American boys co-champions with Norristown. Chris Hammes in 2008 and Julius Selfinger in 2012 bowled perfect games. PW's bowling program began in 2004.
- Baseball: 1994 State Champions, ranked 6th best high school baseball team in the country in USA Today. SOL American champions in 2019.
- Boys' lacrosse: 2011 marked the Colonials' first Suburban One American Boys Lacrosse title in PW history, playing to an undefeated 12-0 league campaign. Also won the 2012 Suburban One American title with a 12-0 league campaign, plus the Colonials earned their first District 1 playoff victory in 2012. Playoff appearances (2009 to 2016.
- Girls' lacrosse: League champions in 2004, 2016, 2018.
- Field hockey: Suburban One American champions (2013 to 2019).
- Softball: 2008 Suburban One American quad-champions with Methacton, Upper Merion, and Cheltenham. PW recorded lone playoff victory in 2009. District 1 AAAA appearances: 2008 (first round), 2009 (first and second rounds), 2011 (first round), and 2016 (first round). Dana Moyer has coached the Lady Colonials since spring 2011.
- Cheerleading: Numerous first place wins each year as well as bids to national competitions in Florida, Virginia, and Pittsburgh.
- Ice hockey:2008-2009 SHSHL A Champions, 2019-2020 SHSHL A Champions. 13 Flyers Cup Appearances have been made by the team, with recent success making the tournament five consecutive seasons (2018–19 to 2022–23).
- Boys' soccer: Suburban One Liberty Boys Soccer champions in 1985. Suburban One American champions in 2013 with a 13-l league mark sharing with Upper Dublin, earning the eighth seed in the District One AAA tournament advancing to the second round (lost 1–0 to visiting nine Bensalem) after its first-ever District One playoff victory (1–0 home victory against visiting 25 Harriton in first round). Suburban One American champions 2014 with a 13–1 league record, earning the fifth place seed in the District One AAA tournament advancing to the quarterfinals (lost 2–1 to Central Bucks East in overtime). Also advanced to second round of districts in 2015 and 2017.
- Girls' soccer: Suburban One American champion in 2011 and 2014. PIAA District 1 AAA playoff appearances in 2010 (round one loss), 2011 (round one loss), 2013 (round one loss), and 2014 (won first-round game, lost second round). District 1 AAAA playoff appearances in 2017 (round one loss) and 2019 (round one win, round two loss).
- Girls' volleyball: District 1 AAAA runner-up and PIAA AAAA state quarterfinalist in 2016. Suburban One Continental/American champion (2016 to 2018); also won conference titles (1983 to 1989 and 1999; District 1 champion in 1984).
- Swimming: Matt Golebiewski was a four-time state champion, winning the 200- and 500-yard freestyle as a junior in 2004 and then repeating the double in 2005. In the 200, he broke the state record at the time.
- Wrestling: Justin Giovinco captured the PIAA AAA state championship in 1998 and 1999 at the 140 lbs. and 145 lbs. weight classes. Giovinco finished his career with a 144–8 record and went on to wrestle at the University of Pittsburgh. John Michael Staudenmayer won the PIAA, AAA state championship in 2011 at the 171 lbs. weight class. Staudenmayer finished his career with a 168–11 record and went on to wrestle at the University of North Carolina. Long-time coach Bob Lorence retired in 2008 and finished with a 357–180–6 career coaching record. Lorence was inducted into the Southeast Pennsylvania Hall of Fame in 2002 and the PIAA Wrestling Hall of Fame in 2006.
- Marching band: In November 2024, the Plymouth Whitemarsh Marching Colonials won a Cavalcade of Bands state championship against 14 other highly competitive marching bands in the Independence A Division with a score of 92.85. The band also took home awards for High Visual, High Auxiliary, and High Overall Effect. Their 2024 season show was titled "The Golden Rule" and led by Director Bobbey Biddle and 7 other staff members.
- Indoor color guard. In the 2024 MAIN color guard season managed to claim an undefeated season winning their champs competition with as score of 93.92 on April 20, 2024 in the CURE insurance arena in new jersey

== Colonial Players ==
The Colonial Players are an extra curricular theatre program founded in 1977 that strives to produce professional-quality musicals and plays. They serve primarily to enhance live theatre performances in the local community and to give students an opportunity to express themselves. The musical production's earn critic acclaim by the Greater Philadelphia Cappies, a high school theatre awards program, and took home their first Cappie award in 2006 in Props and Effects for the design of an oversized piano in Big, The Musical. In 2009, the Colonial Players earned 13 Cappie nominations for their production of Little Shop of Horrors, "Best Show" being among them. The Colonial Players' production of How to Succeed in Business Without Really Trying was nominated for 16 Cappie Awards, the most of any school participating in the Greater Philadelphia Cappies. In the 2012–2013 season, the Colonial Players put on Father of the Bride and Guys and Dolls, which was well revered by the high school Cappie reviewers.

== Notable alumni ==
- C. J. Aiken, basketball player
- Beth Anders, 1984 Summer Olympics field hockey caption and bronze medalist
- Owen Biddle, bass guitarist, The Roots
- Jaylen Bond, basketball player
- Craig Borten, screenwriter, Dallas Buyers Club
- Dan Borislow, telecom entrepreneur and inventor of Magicjack
- Joe Daley, former professional golfer

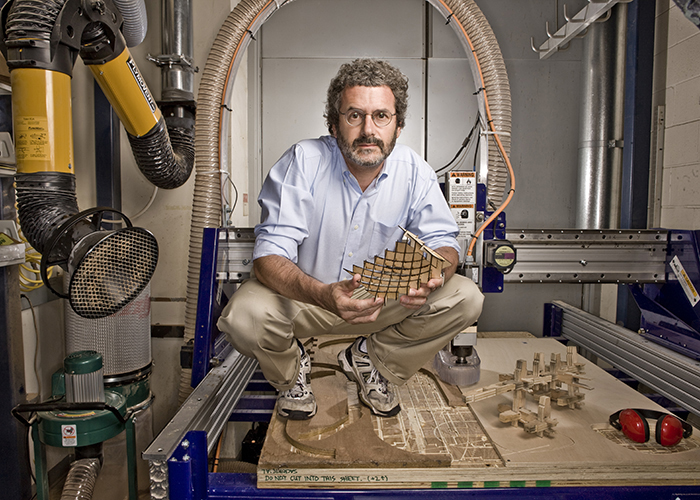
Neil Gershenfeld in 2008

- Jacqui Frazier-Lyde, attorney, boxer, and daughter of former professional boxer Joe Frazier
- Marvis Frazier, boxer and son of Joe Frazier
- Neil Gershenfeld, professor, Massachusetts Institute of Technology
- Curtis King, former professional baseball pitcher, St. Louis Cardinals
- James Martin, Jesuit priest, author, and commentator
- Tom Mitchell, former professional football player, Baltimore Colts, Oakland Raiders, and San Francisco 49ers
- John Pergine, former professional football player, Los Angeles Rams and Washington Redskins
- Michael Rubin, founder and CEO of Fanatics
- John Salmons, former professional basketball player
- Steve Schlachter, former American-Israeli basketball player in the Israeli Basketball Premier League
- Da'Rel Scott, former professional football running back, New York Giants
- Christopher Wilkinson, Academy Award-nominated screenwriter, producer, and director
