= Colonial School District =

Colonial School District is a name shared by several school districts in the United States.

- Colonial School District of New Castle County, Delaware
- Colonial School District of Montgomery County, Pennsylvania

== See also ==
- Colonial School, Paris, a defunct higher education institution in France
