= East Norriton Township, Pennsylvania =

Township in Pennsylvania, US

East Norriton Township
- Township
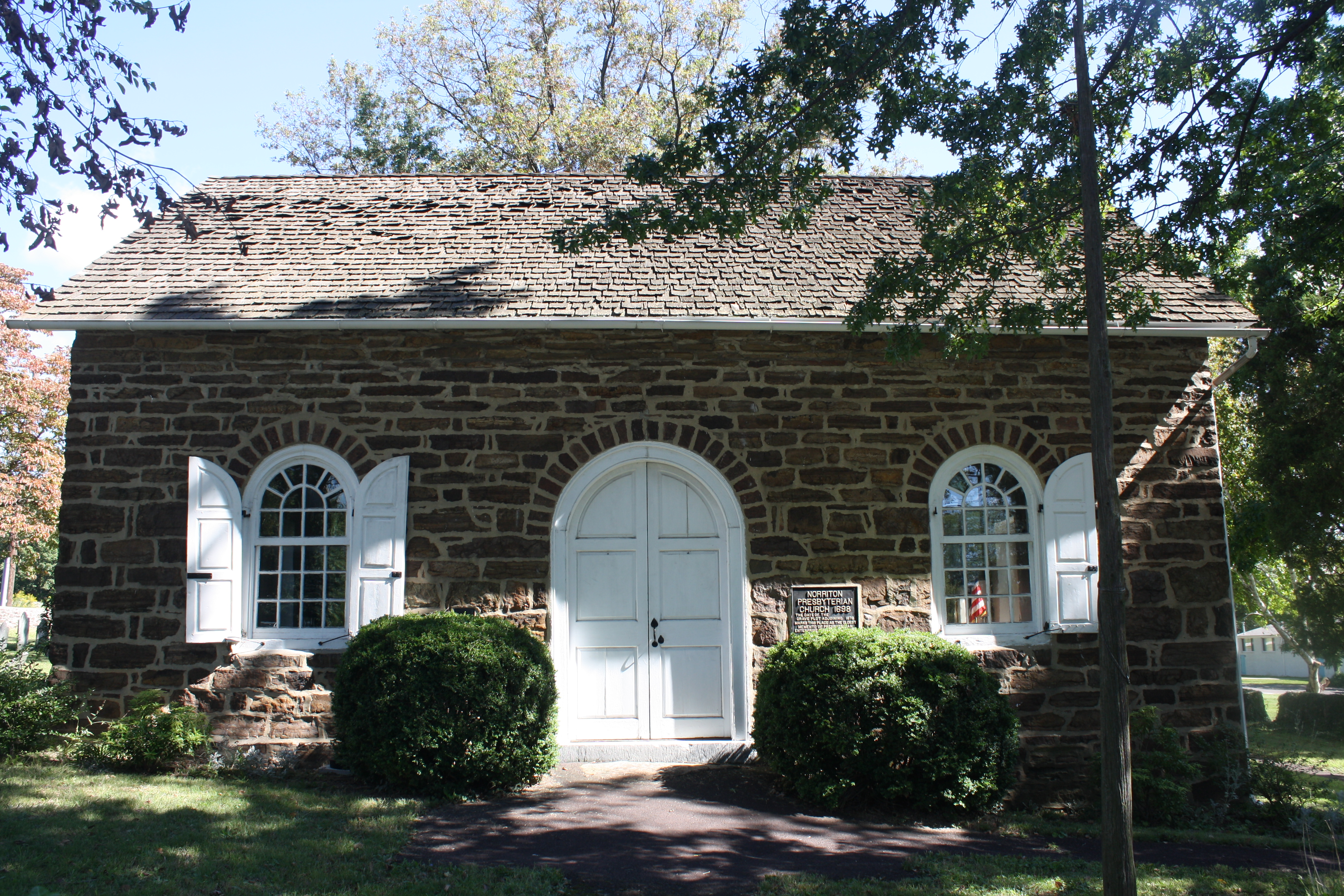
- Old Norriton Presbyterian Church

- Seal

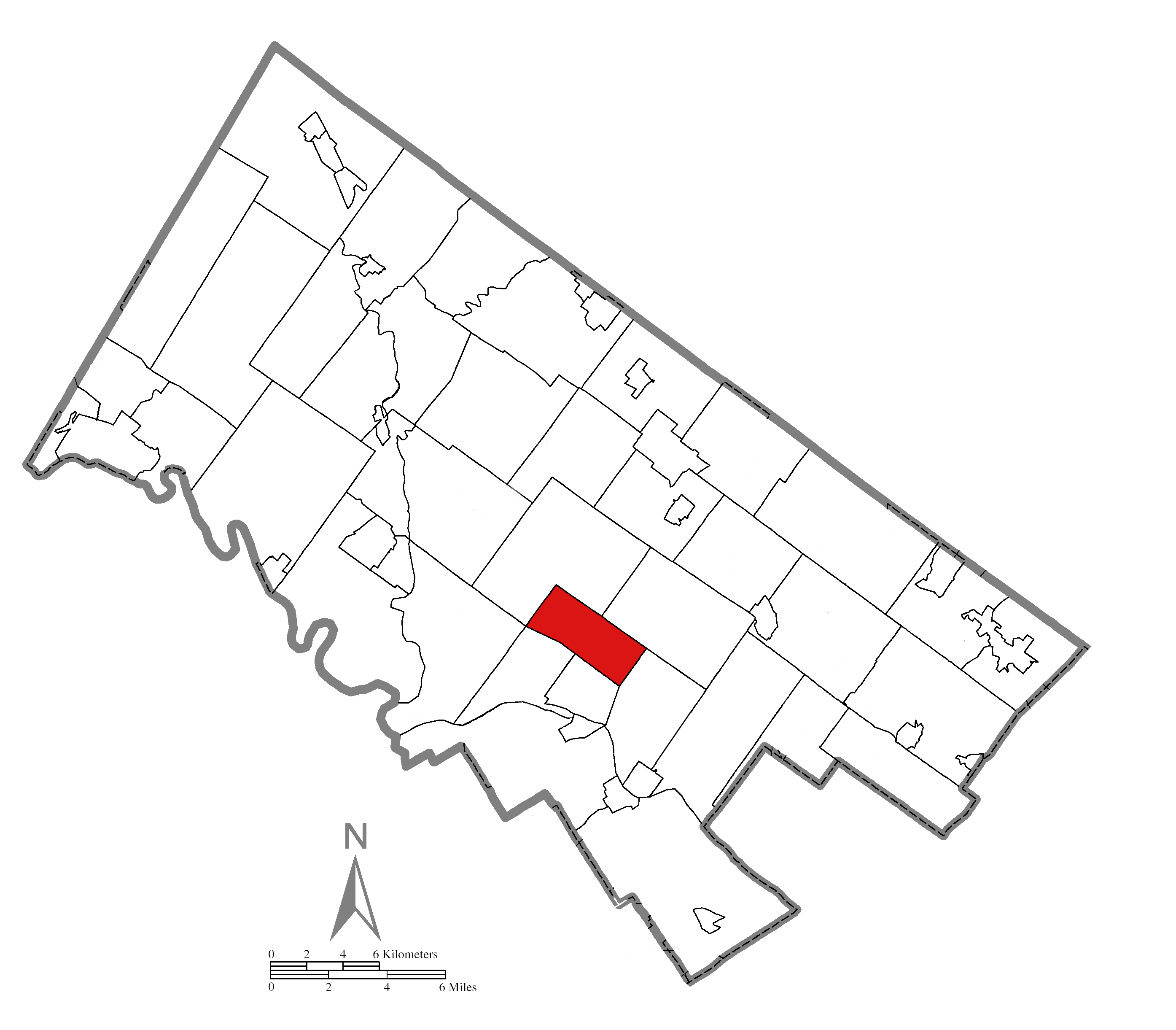
- Location of East Norriton Township within Montgomery County, Pennsylvania
- Coordinates: 40°09′00″N 75°19′46″W
- Country: United States
- State: Pennsylvania
- County: Montgomery

Area
  - Total: 6.07 sq mi (15.71 km^{2})
  - Land: 6.05 sq mi (15.68 km^{2})
  - Water: 0.012 sq mi (0.03 km^{2})
- Elevation: 194 ft (59 m)

Population (2010)
  - Total: 13,590
  - Estimate (2016): 14,080
  - Density: 2,326.2/sq mi (898.14/km^{2})
- Time zone: UTC-5 (EST)
  - Summer (DST): UTC-4 (EDT)
- Area code: 610
- FIPS code: 42-091-21600
- Website: www.eastnorritontwp.org

East Norriton Township is a township in Montgomery County, Pennsylvania, United States. The population was 13,590 at the 2010 census. It is served by the Norristown Area School District.

== History ==
On March 9, 1909, Norriton Township was divided into East Norriton Township and West Norriton Township.

The Barley Sheaf Inn and Old Norriton Presbyterian Church are listed on the National Register of Historic Places.

== Geography ==
East Norriton Township is located at 40°8′55″N 75°19′58″W (40.148744, -75.33291).

According to the U.S. Census Bureau, the township has a total area of 6.1 square miles (16 km^{2}), of which 6.1 square miles (16 km^{2}) is land and 0.16% is water. East Norriton was recognized by Business Week as one of the nation's top five Best Affordable Suburbs in 2009. East Norriton is a former farming community 8 miles (13 km) northwest of Philadelphia's city limits, consisting of residential, commercial, and industrial areas. Shopping malls close to East Norriton are the Plymouth Meeting Mall, which is the closest one at 4 miles (6.4 km) away, and the King of Prussia Mall. The township is situated on the US 202 corridor, north of King of Prussia and Norristown. East Norriton has a little league program.

=== Neighboring municipalities ===
- Worcester Township (north)
- Whitpain Township (east)
- Plymouth Township (southeast)
- Norristown (south)
- West Norriton Township (southwest)
- Lower Providence Township (tangent to the west)

== Government and politics ==
Presidential elections results
Year	Republican	Democratic
2024	39.8% 3,658	59.2% 5,437
2020	39.0% 3,516	59.9% 5,399
2016	40.5% 3,230	55.4% 4,418
2012	44.4% 3,322	54.3% 4,068
2008	42.4% 3,173	56.8% 4,248
2004	47.6% 3,282	52.0% 3,584
2000	45.9% 2,726	51.2% 3,038
1996	44.3% 2,405	45.6% 2,477
1992	44.0% 2,682	37.4% 2,281

East Norriton Township is a second-class township that elects five supervisors at-large.

- Dennis DeSanto Jr., Chair
- Ashley DiPiero, Vice-chair
- Joseph Gavanus
- Kevin McDevitt
- Laura Rivera

== Demographics ==
Historical population
Census	Pop.	Note	%±
1930	1,624		—
1940	1,948		20.0%
1950	2,987		53.3%
1960	7,773		160.2%
1970	11,837		52.3%
1980	12,711		7.4%
1990	13,324		4.8%
2000	13,211		−0.8%
2010	13,590		2.9%
2020	14,021		3.2%

As of the 2010 census, the township was 82.0% White, 9.0% Black or African American, 0.1% Native American, 6.3% Asian, and 1.5% were two or more races. 3.2% of the population were of Hispanic or Latino ancestry.

As of the census of 2000, there were 13,211 people, 5,156 households, and 3,547 families residing in the township. The population density was 2,172.7 inhabitants per square mile (838.9/km^{2}). There were 5,310 housing units at an average density of 873.3 per square mile (337.2/km^{2}). The racial makeup of the township was 88.79% White, 6.06% African American, 0.13% Native American, 3.84% Asian, 0.39% from other races, and 0.80% from two or more races. Hispanic or Latino of any race were 1.17% of the population.

There were 5,156 households, out of which 24.7% had children under the age of 18 living with them, 58.4% were married couples living together, 7.2% had a female householder with no husband present, and 31.2% were non-families. 25.4% of all households were made up of individuals, and 11.2% had someone living alone who was 65 years of age or older. The average household size was 2.45 and the average family size was 2.97.

In the township the population was spread out, with 18.8% under the age of 18, 6.1% from 18 to 24, 29.2% from 25 to 44, 25.4% from 45 to 64, and 20.4% who were 65 years of age or older. The median age was 42 years. For every 100 females there were 90.8 males. For every 100 females age 18 and over, there were 88.1 males.

The median income for a household in the township was $60,536, and the median income for a family was $70,162. Males had a median income of $49,737 versus $33,642 for females. The per capita income for the township was $28,749. About 1.9% of families and 2.9% of the population were below the poverty line, including 2.1% of those under age 18 and 5.9% of those age 65 or over.

== Transportation ==
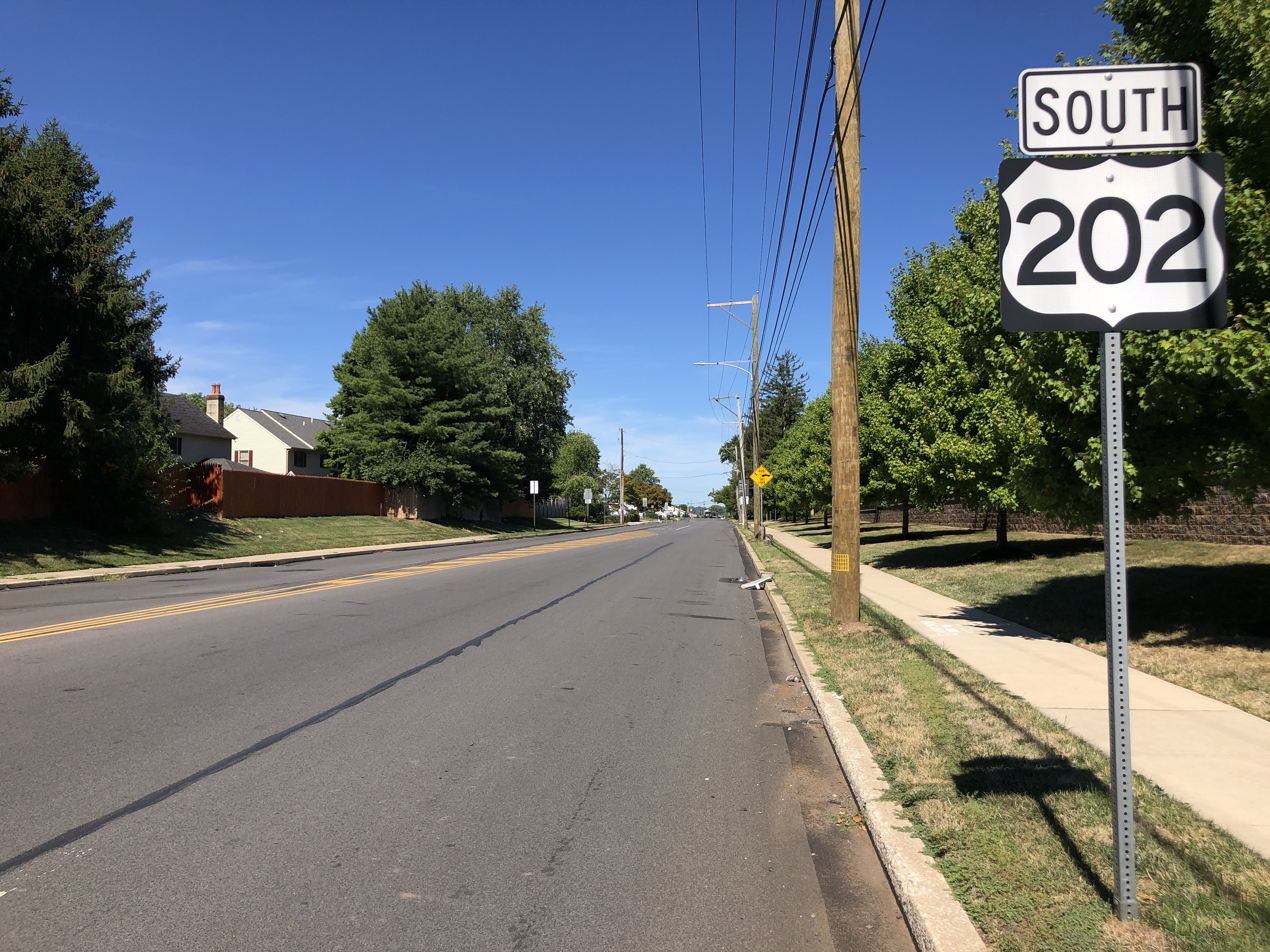
US 202 southbound along East Norriton's border with Norristown

As of 2018, there were 66.54 miles (107.09 km) of public roads in East Norriton Township, of which 16.50 miles (26.55 km) were maintained by the Pennsylvania Department of Transportation (PennDOT) and 50.04 miles (80.53 km) were maintained by the township.

US 202 is the only numbered highway directly serving the township. It mostly follows Dekalb Pike along a northeast-southwest alignment across the southeastern portion of East Norriton. Southbound US 202 breaks off from Dekalb Pike to follow Johnson Highway along the border with Norristown for a short stretch before turning left into Norristown via Markley Street.

SEPTA provides Suburban Bus service to East Norriton Township along Route 90, which runs between the Norristown Transportation Center and the Plymouth Meeting Mall; Route 96, which runs between the Norristown Transportation Center and Lansdale; and Route 98, which runs between the Norristown Transportation Center and Blue Bell via the Plymouth Meeting Mall.

== Economy ==
Einstein Medical Center, the major hospital for Montgomery County sits on 87 acres, the former land of Wood's Golf Center

Genuardi's, a division of Safeway Inc., formerly had its headquarters in the township.

== Education ==
The township is in the Norristown Area School District.

Holy Rosary Regional Catholic School in Plymouth Meeting and Plymouth Township is the area Catholic school. It was formed in 2012 by the merger of Our Lady of Victory in East Norriton, Epiphany of Our Lord School in Plymouth Meeting, and St. Titus in East Norriton.

== See also ==
- Norristown
