= Cold Point Historic District =

Historic district in Pennsylvania, United States

- U.S. National Register of Historic Places
- U.S. Historic district
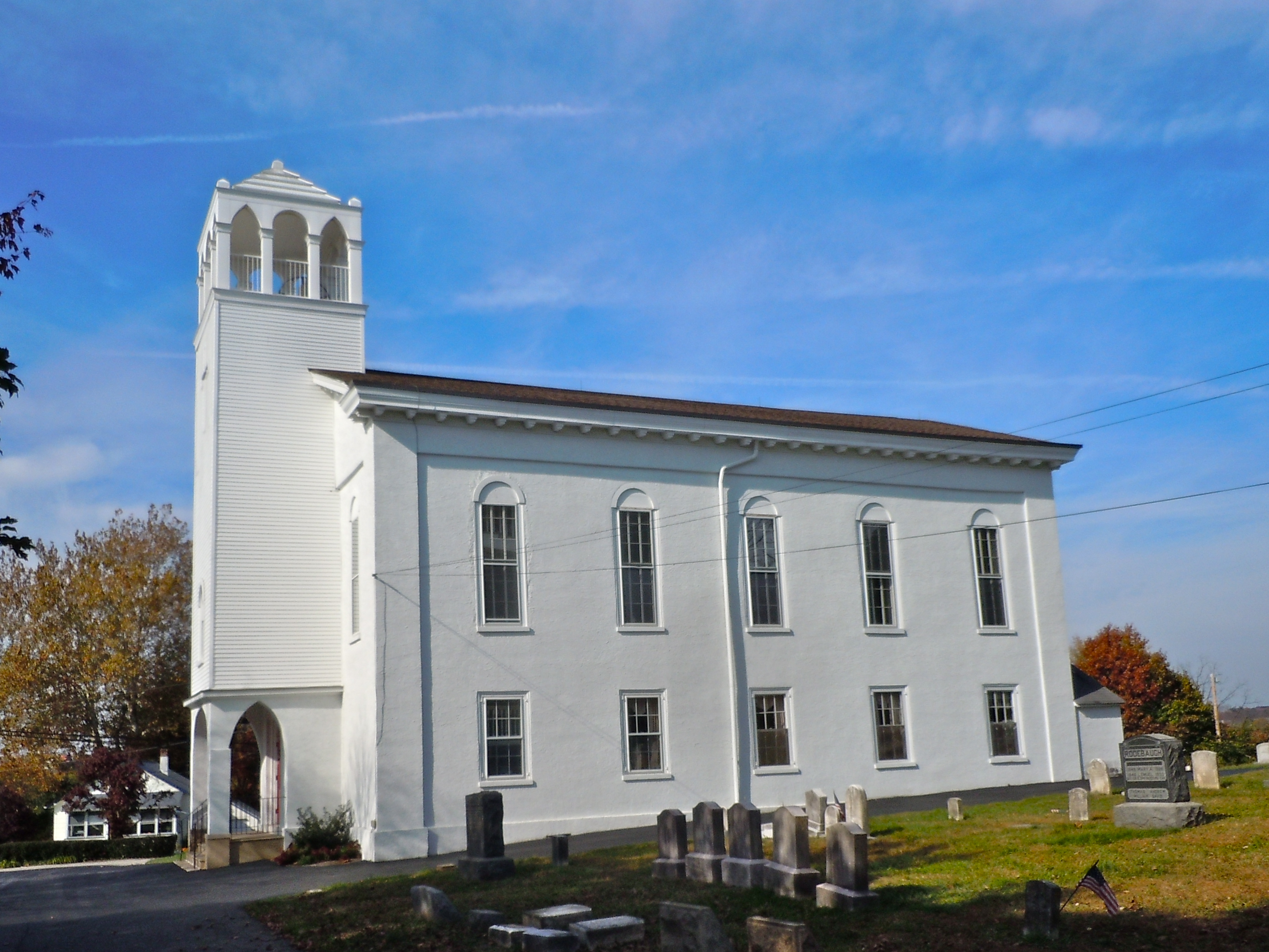
- Cold Point Baptist Church, November 2011

- Location within Pennsylvania Location within the United States
- Nearest city: Interstate 276, Butler Pike, Militia Hill and Narcissa Roads, Plymouth Township and Whitemarsh Township, Pennsylvania
- Coordinates: 40°06′52″N 75°16′06″W
- Area: 157 acres (64 ha)
- Architect: Multiple
- Architectural style: Greek Revival, Gothic
- NRHP reference No.: 83002261
- Added to NRHP: September 9, 1983

Cold Point Historic District is a national historic district located in Plymouth Township and Whitemarsh Township, Montgomery County, Pennsylvania. It is an eastward extension of the Plymouth Meeting Historic District. It encompasses 62 contributing buildings and 1 contributing site dated from 1745 to 1878 in the Village of Cold Point. It includes predominantly 2 1/2-story, stuccoed rubble stone structures dated to the early- to mid-19th century. A few reflect the Greek Revival and Gothic Revival styles. Notable buildings include the separately listed Alan West Corson Homestead, Cold Point Baptist Church and burial ground, and Cold Point School.

It was added to the National Register of Historic Places in 1983.

On the line adjoining Plymouth and Whitemarsh townships is an elevation known as Cold Point, where there is a scattered hamlet, containing on the Whitemarsh side more than a dozen houses. The Cold Point Baptist Church, located at this place, was first known as the Plymouth Church, and the locality became a preaching-place about 1842, when the Rev. Robert Young, then pastor of the Chestnut Hill Baptist Church, began service in the school-house, which then stood opposite the present church. The corner-stone of the old stone church edifice was laid in the summer of 1845, and after completion was in use until 1867. The corner-stone of the present stone house, sixty by forty feet, was laid in August of that year and completed and dedicated in 1868 and is still used. It stands a short distance west of the old church.

The membership is about one hundred and fifty. The grounds occupy about two and a half acres and are kept in neat condition. We find on the tombstones the names of Freas, Rodebaugh, Lysinger, Fight, Phipps, Hellings, Williams, White, Sands, Bisbing, Hallet, Rex, Coulson, Moore, Robinson, Fisher, Nagle, Schlater, Yetter, Butler, Kirk, Radcliff, Getman, Wood, Jones, Childs, Wimmer, Roberts, Heller, Gilbert and Dewees.

From these grounds a fine view is obtained of the surrounding country, particularly towards the north and west, embracing the greater portion of Plymouth township. Near this is the residence of the late Alan W. Corson, well known as a teacher, surveyor, nurseryman and botanist, who died June 21, 1882, aged ninety-five years. — History of Montgomery County (1884).

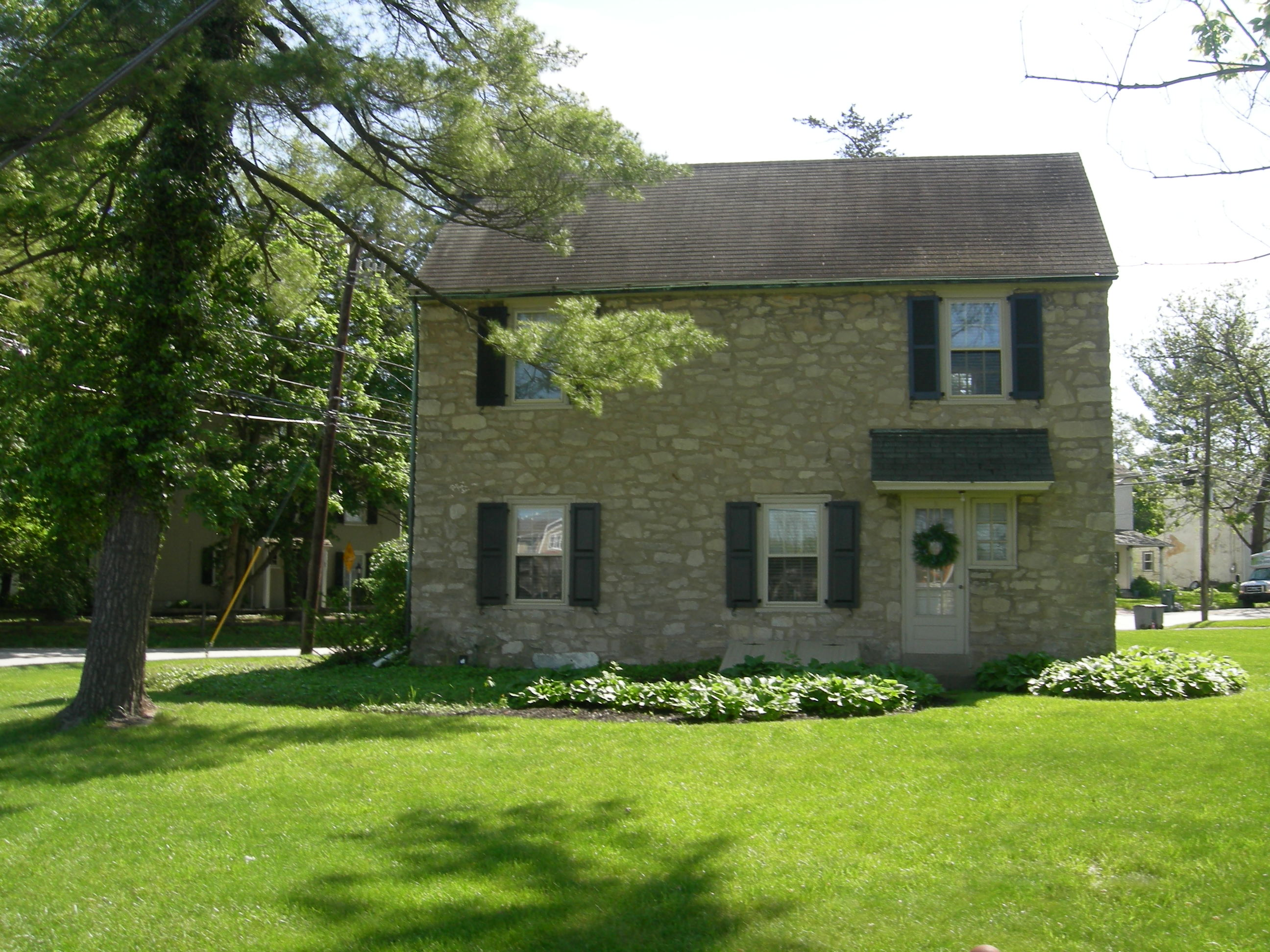
Cater-Corner House (built c.1739), 2 Flourtown Road.
