= Barley Sheaf Inn =

- U.S. National Register of Historic Places
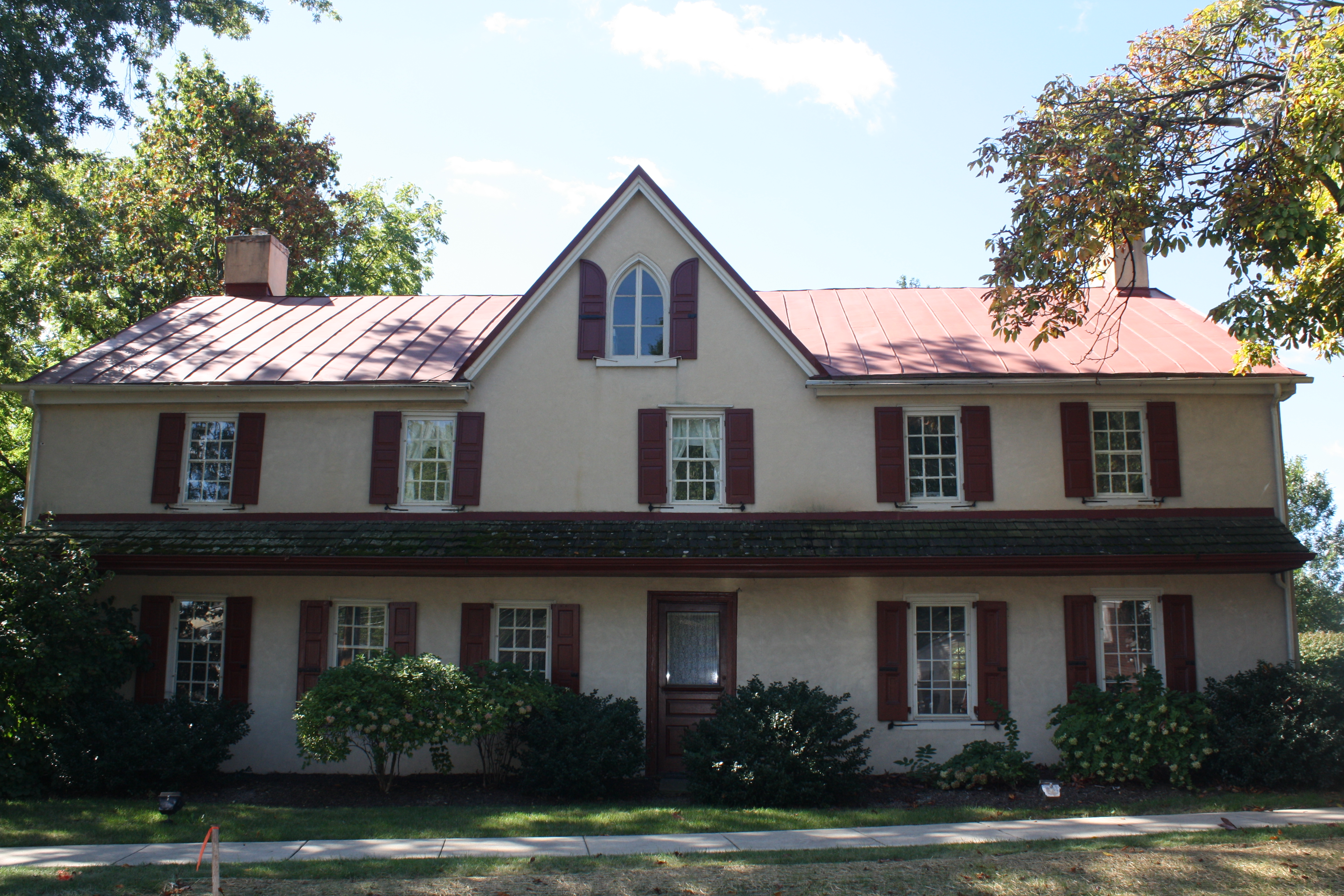
- Barley Sheaf Inn. September 2012.

- Location within Pennsylvania Location within the United States
- Location: North of Norristown at 420 West Germantown Pike, East Norriton Township, Pennsylvania, U.S.
- Coordinates: 40°8′55″N 75°20′5″W
- Area: 1 acre (0.40 ha)
- Built: before 1784
- NRHP reference No.: 80003580
- Added to NRHP: December 10, 1980

Barley Sheaf Inn is a historic inn and tavern located at East Norriton Township, Montgomery County, Pennsylvania. It is a 2 1/2-story, plastered stone building, 60 feet wide and 46 feet deep, with a frame rear addition. Also on the property are a contributing barn and wagon shed. From 1784 to about 1787, it housed the first Montgomery County courthouse. It housed an inn and tavern until 1861, after which it was a private residence. In 1980, it housed professional offices.

It was added to the National Register of Historic Places December 10, 1980.

== See also ==
- Contributing property
- Cultural landscape
- Property type (National Register of Historic Places)
- State Historic Preservation Office
