= Steve Schlachter =

American-Israeli basketball player

Steve Schlachter סטיב שלכטר
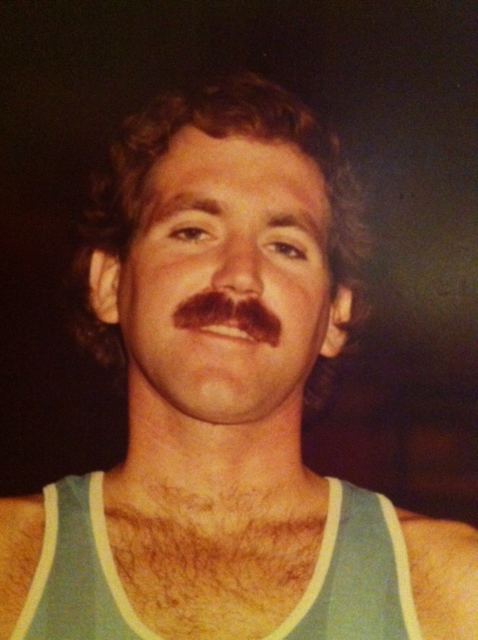

Personal information
- Born: June 30, 1954 (age 72) Plymouth Meeting, Pennsylvania, U.S.
- Listed height: 6 ft 9 in (2.06 m)
- Listed weight: 240 lb (109 kg)

Career information
- High school: Plymouth-Whitemarsh (Plymouth Meeting, Pennsylvania)
- College: Delaware (1973–1976)
- NBA draft: 1976: undrafted
- Playing career: 1977–1995
- Position: Forward / center

Steve Schlachter (Hebrew: סטיב שלכטר; born June 30, 1954) is an American-Israeli former basketball player. He played the forward and center positions. He competed for 16 seasons in the Israel Basketball Premier League, and played for the Israeli national basketball team.

== Biography ==
Schlachter's hometown is Plymouth Meeting, Pennsylvania, and he is Jewish. Schlachter is 6 ft 9 in (206 cm) tall, and weighs 240 pounds.

He attended Plymouth-Whitemarsh High School.

Schlachter then attended the University of Delaware. He played for the Delaware Fightin' Blue Hens in 1973–76. He made aliyah, becoming an Israeli citizen.

He played 16 seasons in the Israel Basketball Premier League. Schlachter competed between 1977 and 1995 for Israeli teams Hapoel Ramat Gan, Maccabi Haifa, and Bnei Herzliya Basket.

Schlachter played for the Israeli national basketball team. He competed for it in the 1981 FIBA European Championship for Men, 1983 FIBA European Championship for Men, and 1985 FIBA European Championship for Men.
