= Plymouth Meeting, Pennsylvania =

Unincorporated community in Pennsylvania, US

- Census-designated place
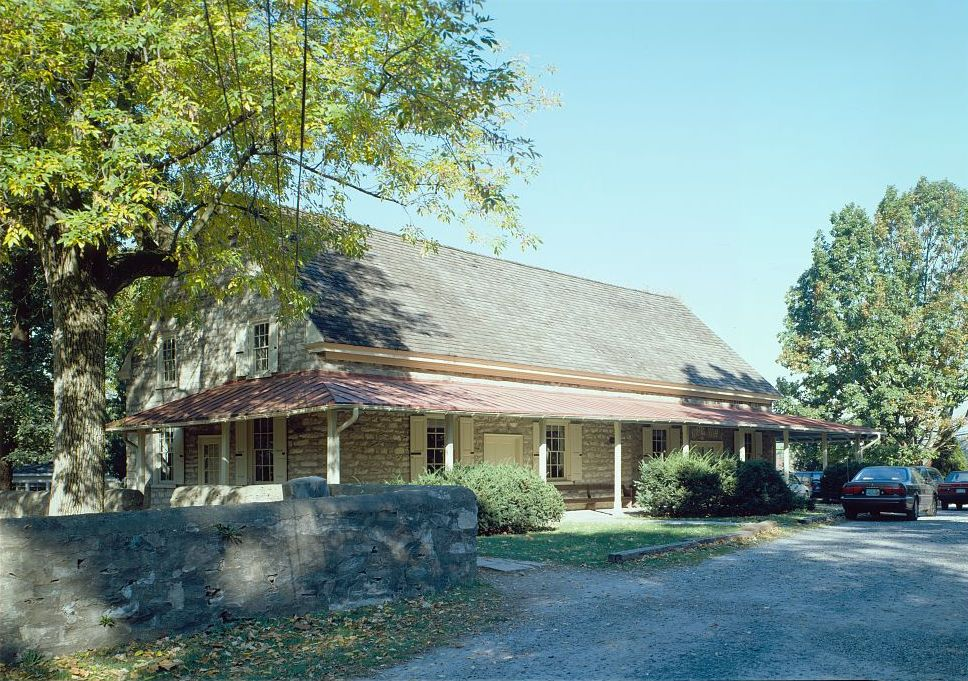
- Plymouth Friends Meetinghouse

- Location within Pennsylvania Location within the United States
- Coordinates: 40°06′08″N 75°16′28″W
- Country: United States
- State: Pennsylvania
- County: Montgomery
- Township: Plymouth, Whitemarsh
- Founded: 1686

Area
  - Total: 3.91 sq mi (10.12 km^{2})
  - Land: 3.91 sq mi (10.12 km^{2})
  - Water: 0 sq mi (0.00 km^{2})
- Elevation: 184 ft (56 m)

Population (2020)
  - Total: 7,452
  - Density: 1,906.9/sq mi (736.24/km^{2})
- Time zone: UTC-5 (Eastern (EST))
  - Summer (DST): UTC-4 (EDT)
- ZIP Code: 19462
- Area codes: 610 and 484
- GNIS feature ID: 1184137

Plymouth Meeting is a census-designated place (CDP) that straddles Plymouth and Whitemarsh Townships in Montgomery County, Pennsylvania, United States. The settlement was founded in 1686.

The population of Plymouth Meeting was 7,452 as of the 2020 census. Plymouth Meeting is home to the Colonial School District, the Plymouth Meeting Mall and several large office parks and shopping centers. It is home to IKEA's U.S. headquarters. The confluence of the Pennsylvania Turnpike (I-276), the Mid-County Expressway/"Blue Route" (I-476) and the Northeast Extension of the Pennsylvania Turnpike (I-476) at the Mid-County Interchange occurs at Plymouth Meeting. This interchange contributes to regional commerce and was a major driver for business and retail development.

Plymouth Meeting is located 18.7 miles (30.1 km) northwest of Philadelphia City Hall, and 47 miles (76 km) southeast of Allentown. Northwestern Avenue, Philadelphia's western boundary at Chestnut Hill, is about 3 miles (4.8 km) southeast of the intersection of Germantown Pike and Butler Pike, in Plymouth Meeting.

== History ==
=== 17th century ===
Plymouth Meeting was settled by members of the Religious Society of Friends, or Quakers. They sailed from Devonshire, England, on the ship Desire, arriving in Philadelphia on June 23, 1686. The settlement takes its name from the founders' hometown of Plymouth in Devon. The Plymouth Friends Meetinghouse was built in 1708, at the southwest corner of what are now Germantown and Butler Pikes.

=== 18th century ===
In 1754, Benjamin Davis received a license to keep an inn on Ridge Pike at Plymouth Creek. This inn, the Seven Stars, was shown on maps as early as 1759. It was demolished in 1975 to make way for the Midcounty Expressway.

Early records indicate that one person was elected as "road supervisor" and tax collector. The roads were mostly dirt, and repair and maintenance was often auctioned off to the lowest bidder, usually a farmer who had large properties and kept many men and horses, and the smaller farmers worked on the roads for them.

Tax records show that many taxpayers paid their taxes by working on the roads. From 1846 to 1854 the road supervisor was paid one dollar per day for his work as supervisor and collector of taxes. Men working on the roads received $.80 per day and boys received $.40 per day. For the use of a double team of horses with a wagon or cart, one was paid $1.75 per day.

During the Revolutionary War, in May 1778, the Plymouth Friends Meetinghouse served as a temporary military hospital. General George Washington, then at Valley Forge, learned that a British force intended to seize the area and cut off movement of the Continental Army. He sent Marquis de Lafayette and 2,100 troops to counter. They camped around the meetinghouse on the night before the May 19 Battle of Barren Hill. The next morning the British arrived with a massive force of 16,000, and tried to cut off any escape route. Lafayette instead took advantage of the Americans' knowledge of local roads, and escaped with minimal casualties.

=== 19th century ===
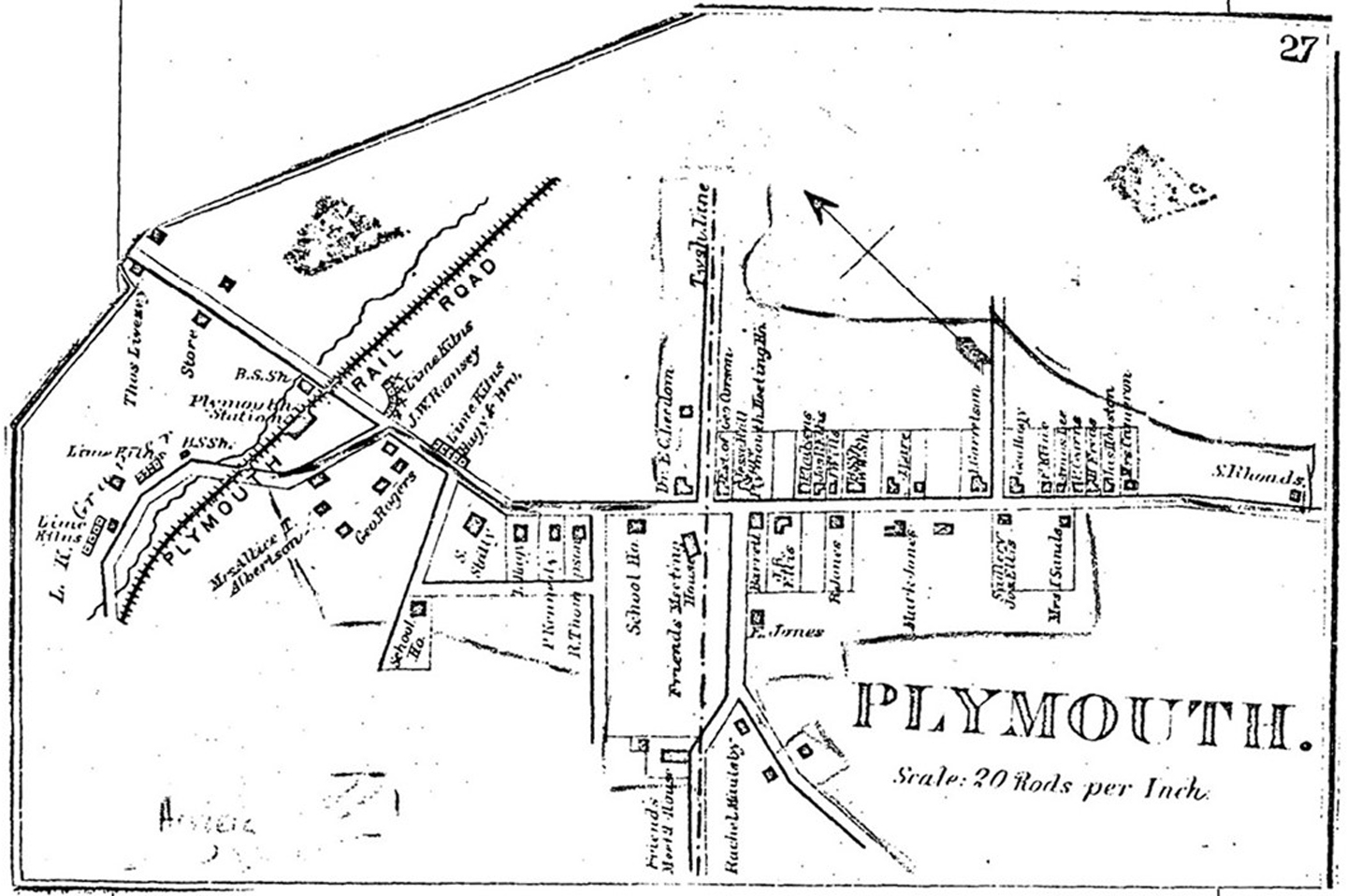
Plymouth Meeting, in the 1871 Hopkins Atlas, plate 27

Plymouth Meeting House is the name of a village situated at the intersection of the Plymouth and Perkiomen turnpikes, on the township line. On this [Plymouth] side is the meeting house, school house and four houses; and in Whitemarsh two stores, a blacksmith and wheelwright shop, post office and twenty-four houses. The houses in this village are chiefly situated along the Perkiomen or Reading pike, nearly adjoining one another, and being of stone, neatly white washed, with shady yards in front, present to the stranger and agreeable appearance. In the basement of the Library building the Methodists hold worship. This is an ancient settlement, whose history dates back nearly to the arrival of William Penn, and is marked as a village on Lewis Evans' map of 1749. The post office was established here before 1827. In 1832 there were but ten houses here. — History of Montgomery County (1858).

In the early 19th century the Hickorytown Hotel, on Germantown Pike opposite Hickory Road, was a prominent road house. Robert Kennedy, an officer in the Revolution, operated the inn in 1801. In 1806 it was kept by Frederick Dull and in 1825, Jacob Hart. In the beginning of the 19th century it was a training place for the 36th Regiment of the Pennsylvania Militia and the Second Battalion of Montgomery County. The Friendship Company for the Protection against Horse Stealing was organized there in 1807. Township elections were held there, and a Hickorytown post office was established in May 1857.

==== Transportation and industry ====
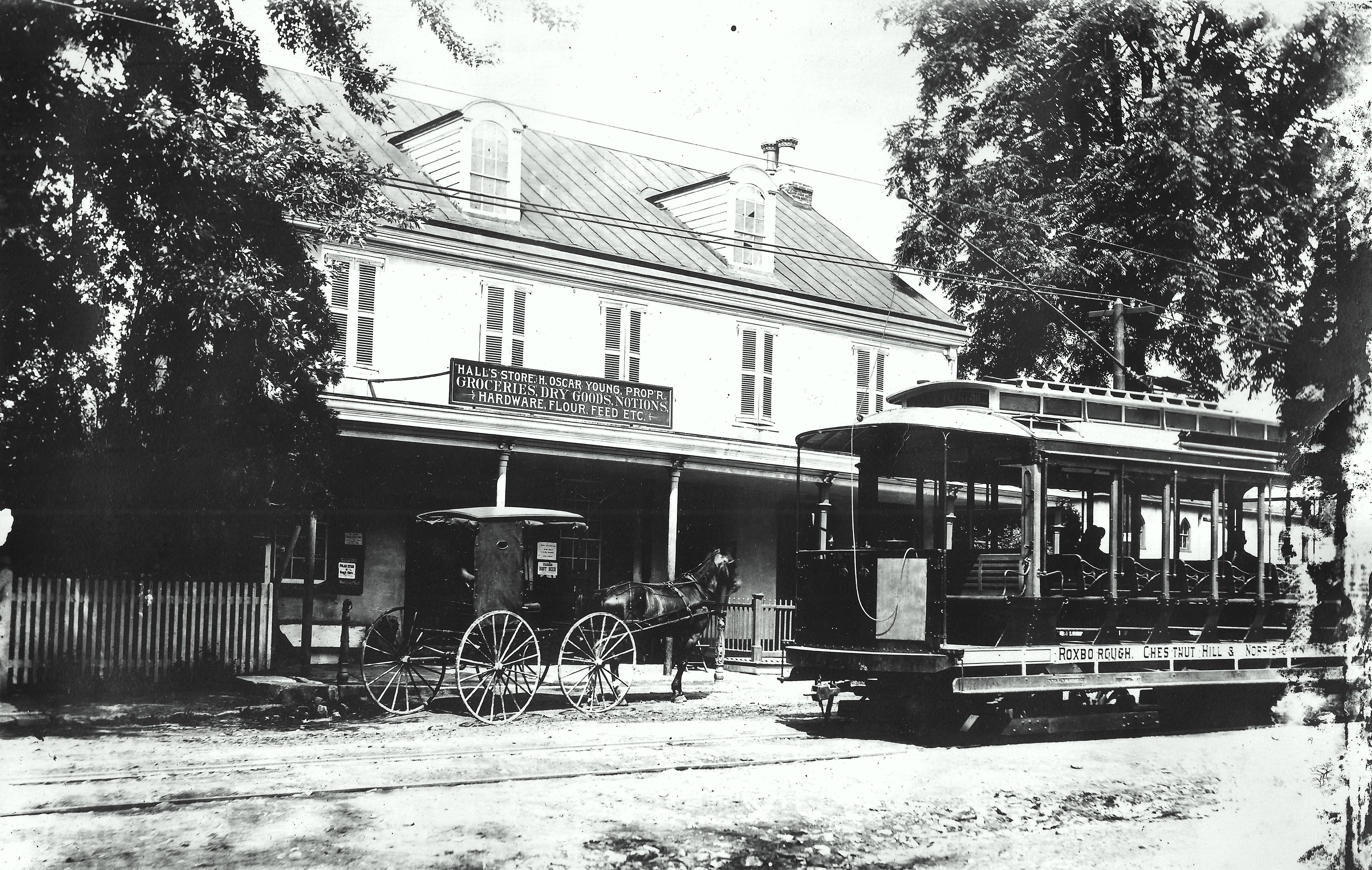
Old Post Office and General Store, 5 E Germantown Pike, c.1900. Note the Roxborough, Chestnut Hill & Norristown trolley.

What is now Germantown Pike was ordered laid out by the Provincial Government in 1687 as a "cart road" from Philadelphia to Plymouth Meeting. The actual road was paved in 1804, at a cost of $11,287. A road from Plymouth Meeting to Gwynedd appears to have been built in 1751. What is now Chemical Road, following Plymouth Creek, was opened in 1759 to provide access to a new gristmill.

The Philadelphia, Germantown, and Norristown Railroad was built along the Schuylkill River through Plymouth Township and commenced operation in 1835. For most of its history, this railroad was part of the Reading Railroad system. Today these tracks are SEPTA's Manayunk/Norristown Line.

The Plymouth Railroad was built in 1836 to serve some 20 lime kilns operating along the route between Conshohocken and Cold Point. In 1870, the line was acquired by the Philadelphia and Reading Railroad and was rebuilt and extended to Oreland at a junction with the North Penn Railroad. The line was abandoned by the 1970s.

The Schuylkill Valley Division of the Pennsylvania Railroad was built parallel to the Reading Railroad tracks along the Schuylkill River, opening for service in 1884. Rail service ended in the 1970s and the track-bed is now occupied by the multi-use (pedestrian and bicycle) Schuylkill River Trail.

The Trenton Cutoff branch of the Pennsylvania Railroad was built in 1891. The Trenton Cutoff is now owned by Norfolk Southern and is known as the Morrisville Line.

In the 1890s, electric trolley lines were built through Plymouth Meeting. The trolleys ran along the shoulder of Germantown Pike and connected Chestnut Hill and Norristown. The trolley along the shoulder of Butler Pike was a short shuttle known as the Harmonville Dinkey, running between Germantown Pike and Ridge Pike (0.7 miles). Dinkey passengers transferred to Conshohocken-bound trolleys at the corner of Ridge Pike and Butler Pike.

Among early industries in Plymouth Township was the Hickorytown Forge operated by the Wood family, and a forerunner of the present Alan Wood Steel Company. The name Plymouth Furnace appears in the records about 1847 and was engaged in the manufacture of nails.

In 1863, the Plymouth Iron Company was organized with a capital of $30,000.00. The company purchased the property of Colwell Furnace, which is located just west of the present Colwell Lane adjoining the development known as Farmview Village.

==== Abolition ====
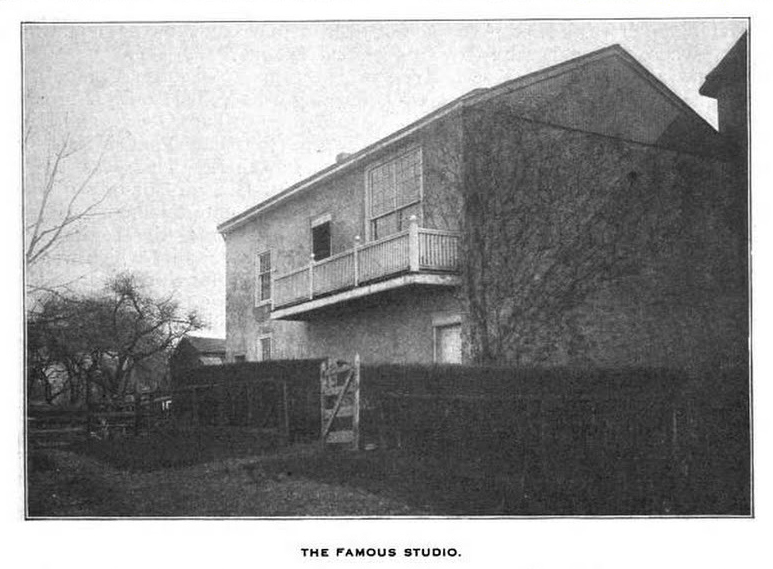
Abolition Hall was built by George Corson in 1856 to house anti-slavery meetings. From 1881 to 1895 it was the studio of painter Thomas Hovenden. 1909 photo

Slave holding was condemned by the Society of Friends in 1754. At the time of the American Revolution, slavery was legal in every one of the 13 Colonies. With the 1780 Gradual Abolition Act, the Pennsylvania legislature became the first state government to implement a gradual abolition of slavery. But completing that process took 67 years.

The Maulsby and Corson families of Plymouth Meeting were early abolitionists, sheltering runaway slaves beginning in the 1810s, and turning their properties into stations on the Underground Railroad. The Fugitive Slave Act of 1850 increased the penalties for giving assistance to an escaped slave to six months in federal prison and a $1,000 fine.

On July 18, 1855, Colonel John H. Wheeler, a North Carolina slaveholder and the new U.S. Minister to Nicaragua, traveled by train from Washington, D.C. to New York City, to be followed by a voyage to Central America. He was accompanied by his wife and children, and his slaves Jane Johnson and her two sons. At Philadelphia, the train passengers had to switch to a ferry to cross the Delaware River. Wheeler locked Johnson and her sons in a hotel room, while he and his family took the afternoon to visit his wife's parents. Johnson's screams for help were heard by a Black porter, who contacted William Still of the Pennsylvania Anti-Slavery Society, who in turn contacted attorney Passmore Williamson. Still and Williamson met Wheeler at the ferry and explained the Pennsylvania law to him and Johnson. Johnson chose to walk away from slavery and, as a pair of Black dockworkers restrained Wheeler, she and her sons were driven away in carriages. The trio were secreted to Boston. Johnson returned to Pennsylvania the following month as a surprise witness in the August 29 trial of William Still and the five dockworkers. Still and three of the dockworkers were acquitted of assault; while the other two were found guilty, spent a week in jail and paid a $10 fine. Following her testimony, Johnson was hidden for several days at George and Martha Corson's house in Plymouth Meeting, to prevent her being kidnapped and returned to slavery.

Johnson's escape to freedom exposed a loophole in the Fugitive Slave Act—because Wheeler had voluntarily brought them into Pennsylvania, Johnson and her sons were not fugitives across state lines, thus, Pennsylvania law rather than federal law applied. The Johnson verdict established that slaveholders could be stripped of their human property who accompanied them while passing through a free state. The Johnson incident was viciously condemned, especially in the South.

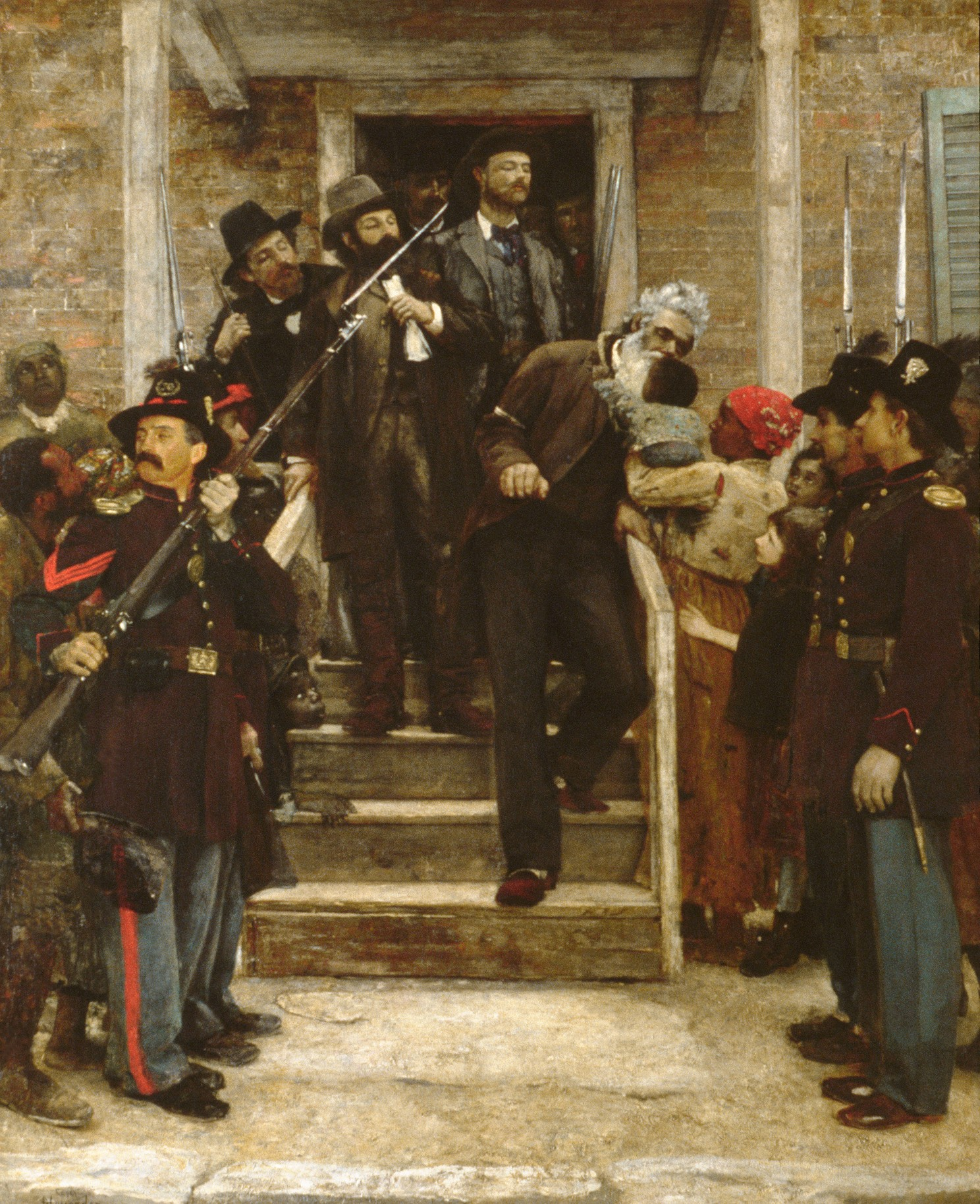
Thomas Hovenden, The Last Moments of John Brown (1884), Metropolitan Museum of Art

Following the suspicious burning of a church that had hosted abolitionist speakers, local churches and schools began denying abolitionists permission to use their buildings. In response, George Corson built Abolition Hall (1856), an addition to his barn at Germantown and Butler Pikes. The hall could accommodate up to 200 people, and hosted speakers such as Frederick Douglass, Harriet Beecher Stowe, Lucretia Mott, Mrs. Stephen Foster and William Lloyd Garrison.

Abolition Hall later became the studio of painter Thomas Hovenden, who married George Corson's daughter Helen, also a painter, in 1881. Perhaps inspired by the righteous arguments that had been made in that same room a generation earlier, Hovenden painted The Last Moments of John Brown (1884), a posthumous portrait of the radical abolitionist and insurrectionist kissing a Black baby as he is led to the gallows.

Hovenden was noted for his genre scenes of American life, many featuring his Plymouth Meeting neighbors, black and white, as models. He succeeded Thomas Eakins as instructor in painting at the Pennsylvania Academy of Fine Arts in 1886. Perhaps Hovenden's most famous painting, Breaking Home Ties (1890), is in the collection of the Philadelphia Museum of Art.

=== 20th century ===
Growth continued for Plymouth Meeting during the 1900s which led to the advent of the Pennsylvania Turnpike, the Plymouth Meeting Mall, high-rise and garden apartment complexes, industries and office buildings.

For most of their existence, the trolley lines were operated by the Reading Transit & Light Company (no relation to the Reading Railroad). In addition to passengers, during the 1910s freight was handled by the RT&L trolleys; an abandoned wooden track-side freight platform near the northwest corner of Germantown Pike and Butler Pike survived into the 1950s. The Harmanville Dinkey was replaced with buses in 1927. The Germantown Pike trolleys ceased operation in December 1931. The trolley that ran from Norristown to Conshohocken through Black Horse, Seven Stars and Harmanville was replaced with buses in September 1933. The roadside trolley tracks were quickly torn up and the adjacent two-lane Ridge Pike, and Butler Pike south of Ridge Pike, were widened to accommodate ever-increasing motor vehicle traffic.

The first school in the township was established by the Plymouth Meeting Society of Friends in 1780, although some records indicate an earlier school. A school was established at Cold Point in 1821. Public schools, established under the system authorized by the legislature in 1834, included Cold Point School, Plymouth Valley School, the Eight Square school, the Sandy Hill school and the North Star school.

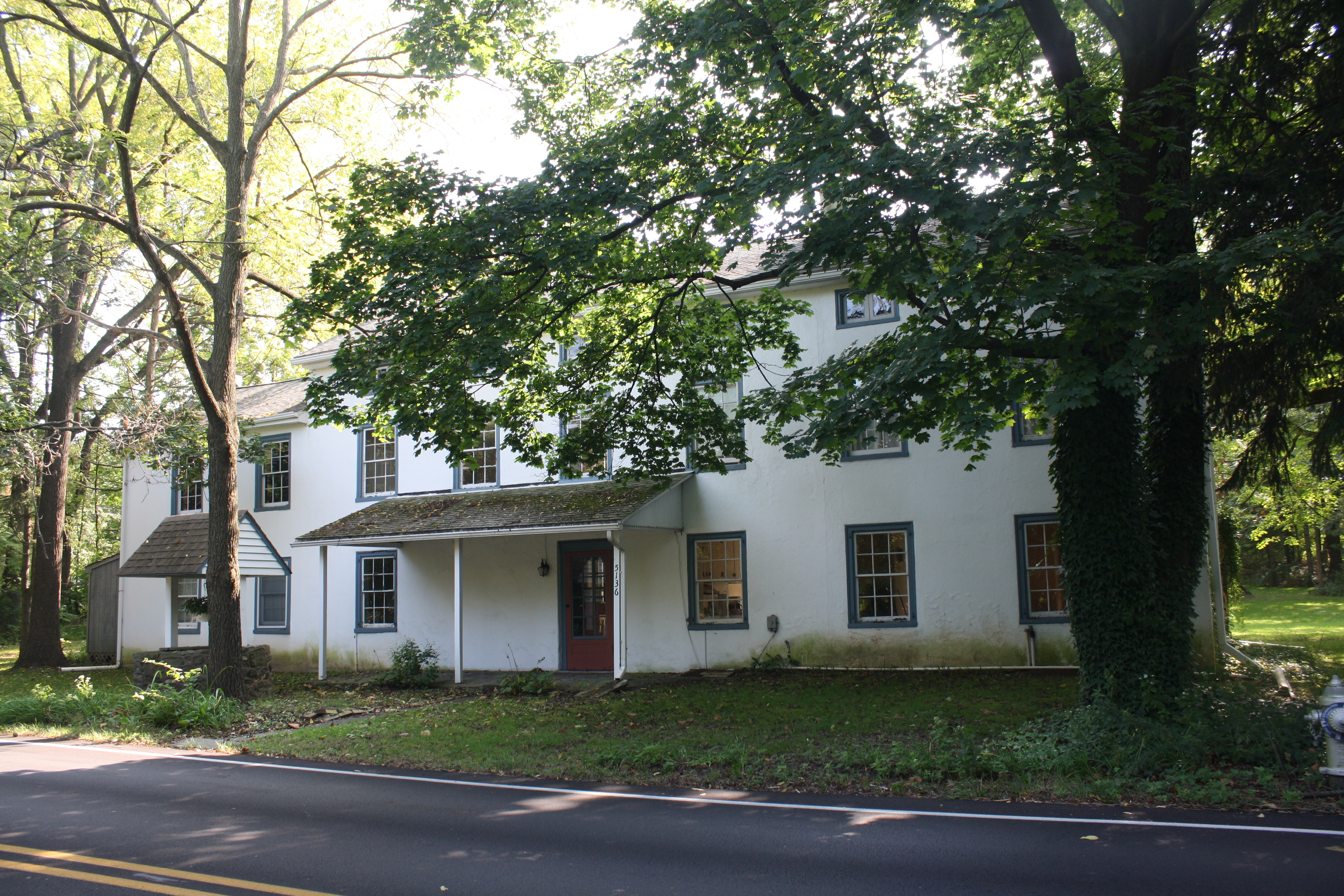
The Alan West Corson Homestead, at 5130 Buter Pike, was a station on the Underground Railroad. It was listed on the National Register of Historic Places in 1971.

Plymouth became a township of the first class in January 1922. Isaac J. Sheppard became township secretary from that time until his retirement in 1952. Under the new form of government the board changed from "road supervisors" to "Township Commissioners".

In 1925, the Board of Health was organized. Plumbing inspection began in 1934. In 1939, Plymouth adopted a "modern" zoning ordinance. A building code ordinance was adopted. In 1947, the first subdivision ordinance was adopted. In 1952, the Township Planning Commission was created, and a Recreation Committee was established to study recreation needs.

Plymouth Township adopted a Home Rule Charter in 1972. This allows a municipality to take any governmental or administrative actions it requires, unless such actions are prohibited by general laws of the Commonwealth.

The Plymouth Meeting Historic District, Alan West Corson Homestead, Plymouth Friends Meetinghouse, and Hovenden House, Barn and Abolition Hall were listed on the National Register of Historic Places in 1971.

== Geography ==
Plymouth Meeting is located primarily within Plymouth Township, with a smaller portion lying within Whitemarsh Township. According to the United States Census Bureau, the CDP has a total area of 3.8 square miles (9.8 km^{2}), all land. Plymouth Township is immediately adjacent to the Schuylkill River, but all river frontage is occupied by industry. Currently a bike trail is under development for river access.

Interstate 476 and the Pennsylvania Turnpike pass through the township. The area is easily accessible to Interstate 76 and the "Main Line" points across the river.

== Demographics ==
Historical population
Census	Pop.	Note	%±
1990	6,241		—
2000	5,593		−10.4%
2010	6,177		10.4%
2020	7,452		20.6%

As of the 2010 census, the CDP was 82.2% Non-Hispanic White, 6.2% Black or African American, 8.4% Asian, 0.6% were Some Other Race, and 1.4% were two or more races. 2.1% of the population were of Hispanic or Latino ancestry.

As of the census of 2000, 5,593 people, 2,215 households, and 1,557 families resided in the CDP. The population density was 1,478.8 inhabitants per square mile (571.0/km^{2}) living in 2,285 housing units at an average density of 604.2 per square mile (233.3/km^{2}). The racial makeup of the CDP was 89.34% White, 3.40% African American, 0.09% Native American, 0.29% Asian, 0.14% from other races, and 0.73% from two or more races. Hispanic or Latino of any race were 0.91% of the population.

28.4% of households had children under age 18 living with them, 59.5% were married couples living together, 7.9% had a female householder with no husband present, and 29.7% were non-families. 25.0% of all households were made up of individuals, and 12.1% had someone living alone who was 65 years of age or older. The average household size was 2.49 and the average family size was 3.00.

In the CDP, the population was spread out, with 22.7% under the age of 18, 5.6% from 18 to 24, 28.1% from 25 to 44, 24.2% from 45 to 64, and 19.4% who were 65 years of age or older. The median age was 41 years. For every 100 females, there were 94.8 males. For every 100 females age 18 and over, there were 89.5 males.

The median income for a household in the CDP was $57,601, and the median income for a family was $71,585. Males had a median income of $50,813 versus $38,906 for females. The per capita income for the CDP was $31,254. About 3.0% of families and 4.0% of the population were below the poverty line, including 4.2% of those under age 18 and 4.6% of those age 65 or over.

== Notable people ==
- Joseph K. Corson, American Civil War soldier and Medal of Honor winner
- Jim Drucker, former Commissioner of the Continental Basketball Association, former Commissioner of the Arena Football League, and founder of NewKadia Comics
- Father James J. Martin, Jesuit priest, writer, editor-at-large of America magazine, and New York Times Best-Selling author
- Steve Schlachter, American-Israeli basketball player

== Attractions ==
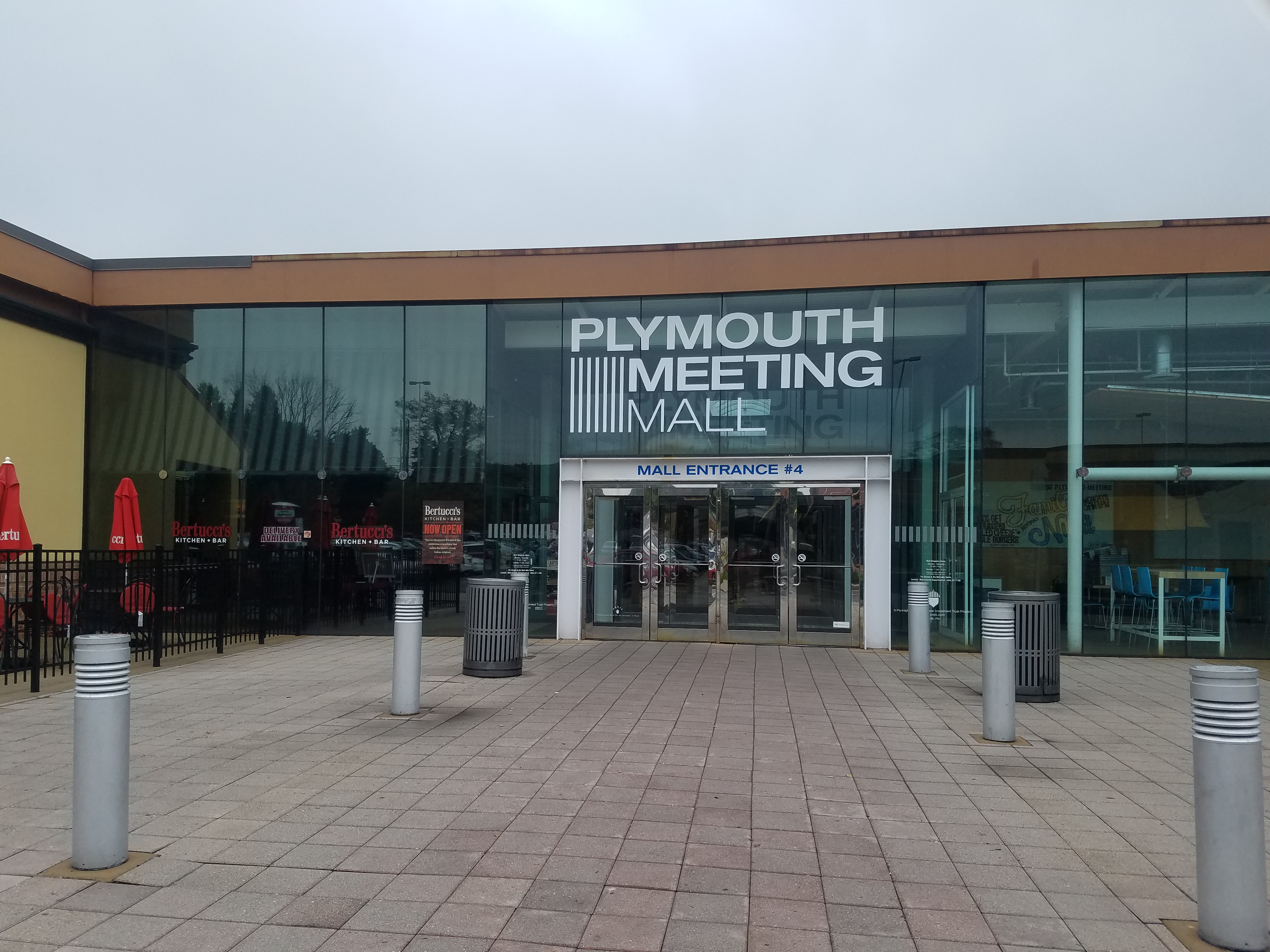
Plymouth Meeting Mall

The historic Plymouth Friends Meetinghouse, built in 1708, is located within the town.

Plymouth Meeting is home to the Plymouth Meeting Mall, which has AMC Theatres adjacent to it, as well as dining and entertainment spots. Boscov's, Burlington, Dick's Sporting Goods, Michaels, and Edge Fitness serve as the anchor stores to the mall.

== Institutions ==
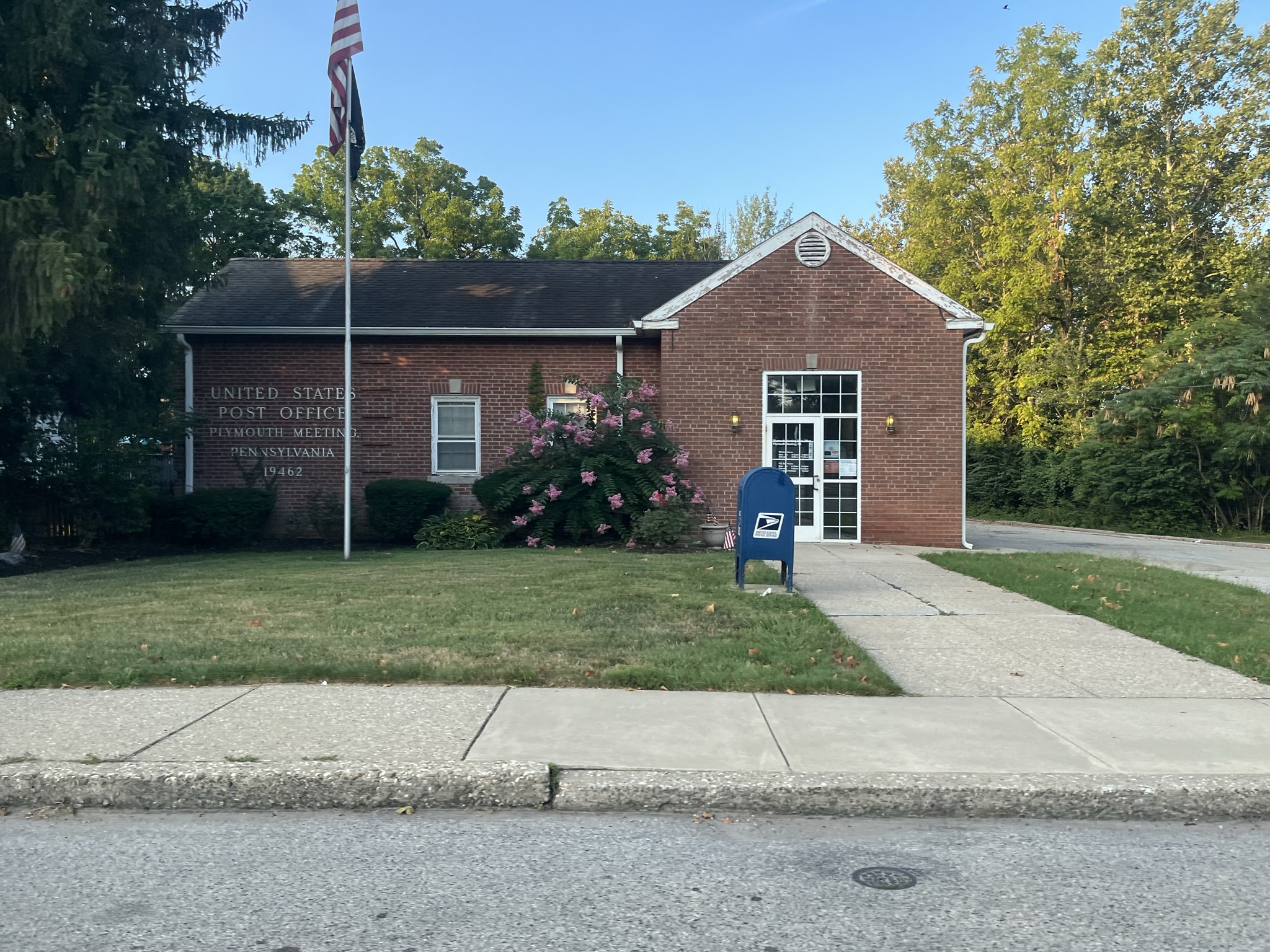
Plymouth Meeting Post Office, located in Whitemarsh Township

Plymouth Meeting spans both Plymouth Township and Whitemarsh Township. The term "Plymouth Meeting" generally refers to the eastern section of Plymouth Township, although Plymouth Meeting Post Office is located on the Whitemarsh Township side of the border. The border area between the townships is also referred to as "Plymouth Whitemarsh," a name used by the local high school.

La Salle University previously maintained a satellite campus in Plymouth Meeting, offering M.B.A. and Clinical-Counseling Psychology M.A. classes at the Metroplex Corporate Center. This location ceased operations as of December 2024.

Villanova University maintains its baseball facilities on the grounds of the Greater Plymouth Community Center at Villanova Ballpark at Plymouth. The park features a walking trail, sand volleyball courts, indoor basketball courts, and a swimming pool. Concerts are held in the summer, and a bocce league is active.

Plymouth Meeting is home to Odyssey Fastpitch Softball, a competitive girls' travel/tournament softball organization that fields teams in the 16U and 18U age groups. The organization is based in Montgomery County, Pennsylvania.

Plymouth Township has an extensive park system, including the Greater Plymouth Community Center and 11 parks comprising approximately 149 acres. East Plymouth Valley Park is also located there.

== Education ==
The Colonial School District covers all portions of the CDP. It maintains its headquarters just south of Plymouth Meeting in Whitemarsh Township. Colonial is regarded as one of the top school districts in the state with consistently high standardized testing results. The two townships share a high school with the borough of Conshohocken.

Holy Rosary Regional Catholic School is the area Catholic school. It was formed in 2012 by the merger of Epiphany of Our Lord School in Plymouth Meeting, Our Lady of Victory in East Norriton Township, and St. Titus in Norristown.
