= Old Norriton Presbyterian Church =

Historic church in Pennsylvania, United States

- U.S. National Register of Historic Places
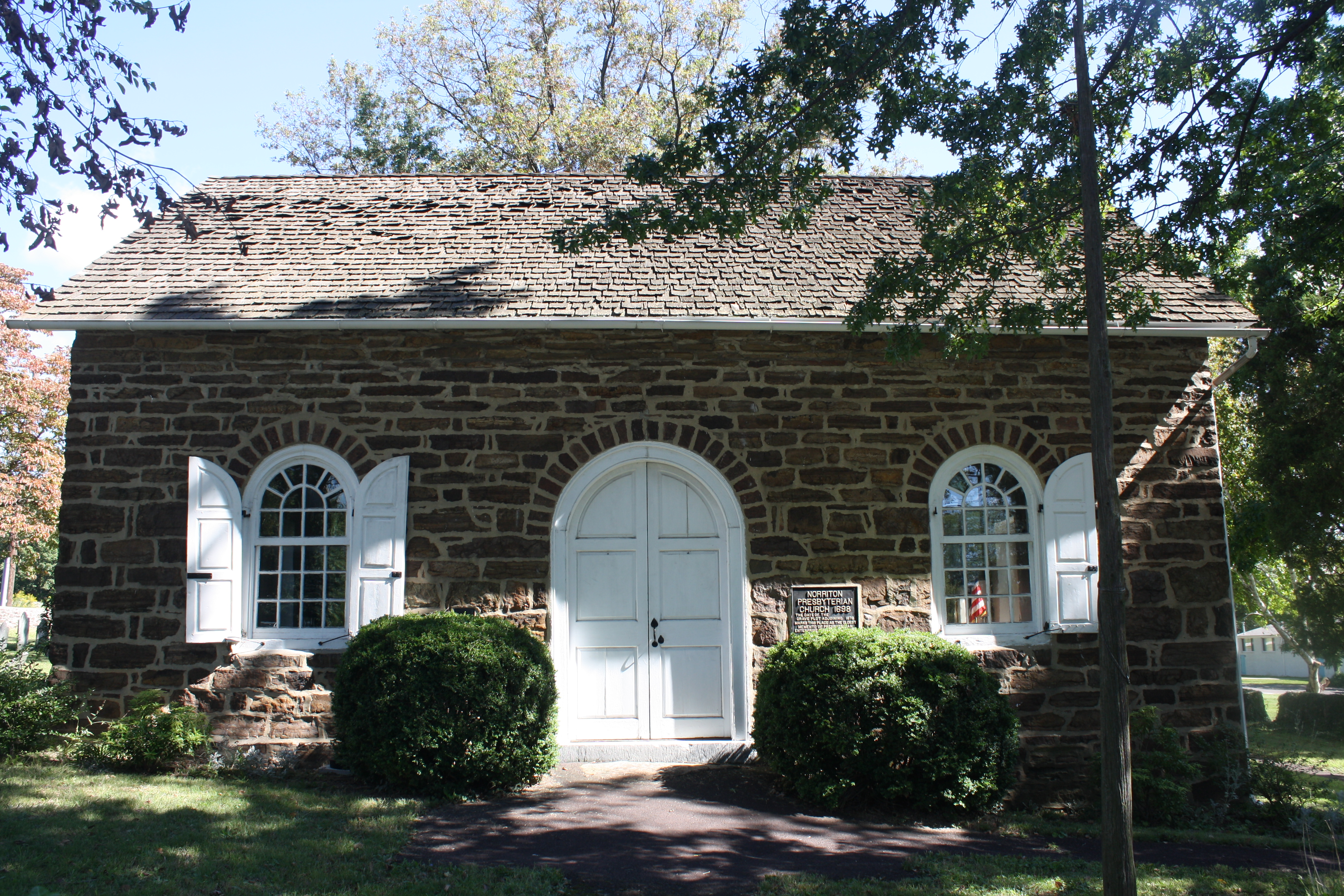
- Old Norriton Presbyterian Church. September 2012.

- Location within Pennsylvania Location within the United States
- Location: 608 N Trooper Rd, Norristown, PA 19403, East Norriton Township, Pennsylvania
- Coordinates: 40°9′30″N 75°22′25″W
- Area: 0.8 acres (0.32 ha)
- Built: 1698
- NRHP reference No.: 79002304
- Added to NRHP: April 3, 1979

Old Norriton Presbyterian Church is a historic Presbyterian church located in East Norriton Township, Montgomery County, Pennsylvania. It was built in 1698, and is a one-story brownstone structure measuring 37 feet, 6 inches, by 27 feet, or three bays by two bays. It has a wooden shake gable roof and round-arch windows. The interior features a barrel vault ceiling.

It was added to the National Register of Historic Places in 1979.
