= Alan West Corson Homestead =

Historic house in Pennsylvania, United States

- Alan W. Corson Homestead
- U.S. National Register of Historic Places
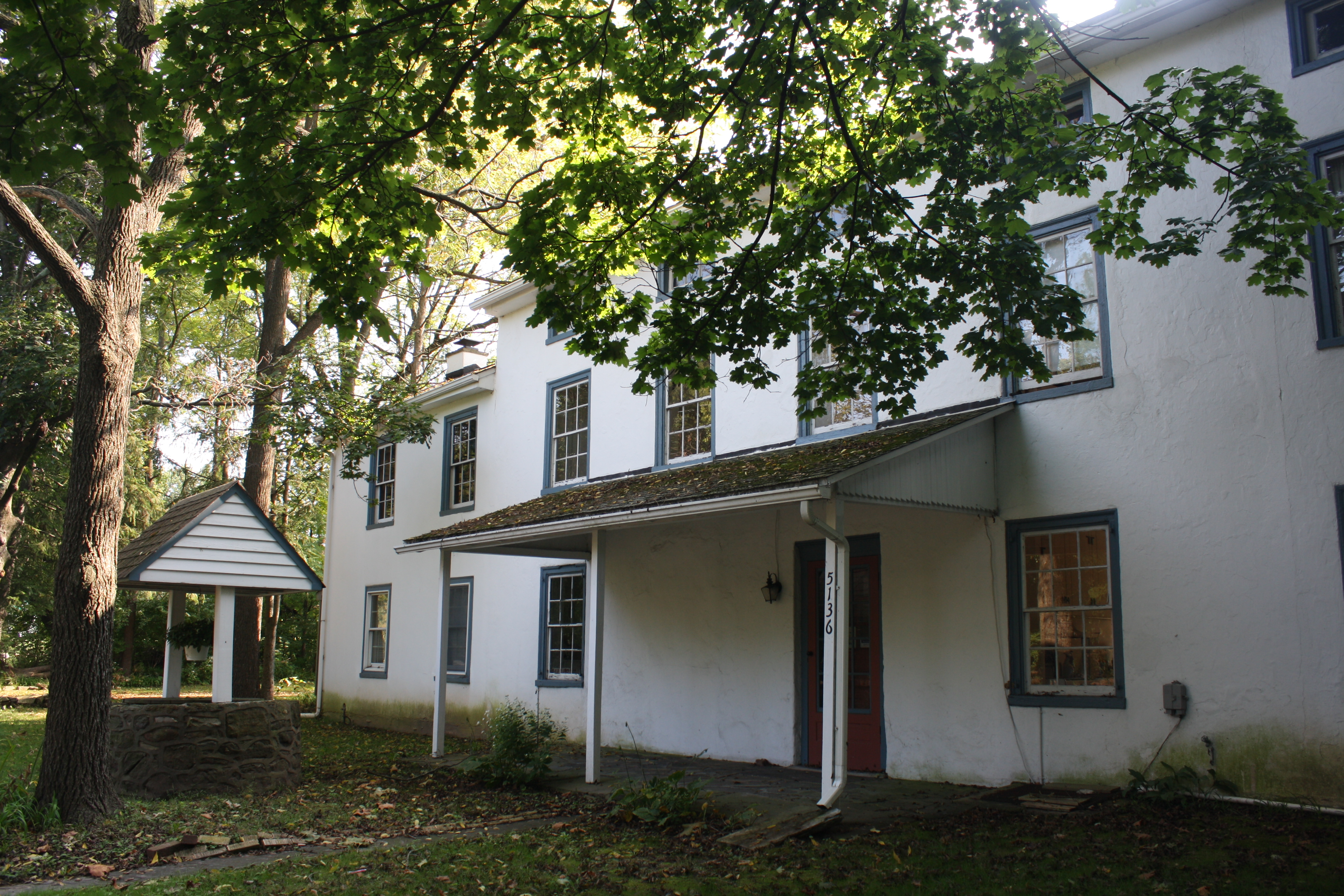
- Alan West Corson Homestead. September 2012.

- Location within Pennsylvania Location within the United States
- Location: 5130 Butler Pike, Whitemarsh Township, Pennsylvania
- Coordinates: 40°7′0″N 75°15′55″W
- Area: 3.5 acres (1.4 ha)
- Built: 1734-1820
- NRHP reference No.: 73001649
- Added to NRHP: June 19, 1973

Alan West Corson Homestead is a historic house located in Whitemarsh Township, Montgomery County, Pennsylvania. It was built in three sections between 1734 and 1820. It is a 2 1/2-story, stuccoed stone dwelling, six bays wide and two bays deep. It has a 2 1/2-story rear ell. Also on the property is a contributing smoke house. The property was used for one of the earliest area nurseries and a boarding school.

It was added to the National Register of Historic Places in 1973. It is located in the Cold Point Historic District.

== Abolitionism ==
Grandson Alan Wright Corson (1788–1882) and his family were Quakers and abolitionists. He was one of the founders of the Montgomery County Anti-Slavery Society (1837), and turned the house into a station on the Underground Railroad. (Note: "The earliest and only abolitionists in Plymouth and Whitemarsh townships were Samuel Maulsby, Joseph Corson and Alan W[right] Corson. Away back before 1820 they had been stirred by the scathing denunciations of slavery, and the horrors of the slave trade, made by Granville Sharp, William Wilberforce and Thomas Fouell Buxton, before the Parliament of Great Britain, to an intense hatred of slavery and the slave trade, and the abominations of slavery in our own country.") His brother George built nearby Abolition Hall as a meeting place for anti-slavery groups.
