= Plymouth Meeting Mall =

Dead mall in Montgomery County, Pennsylvania, U.S.

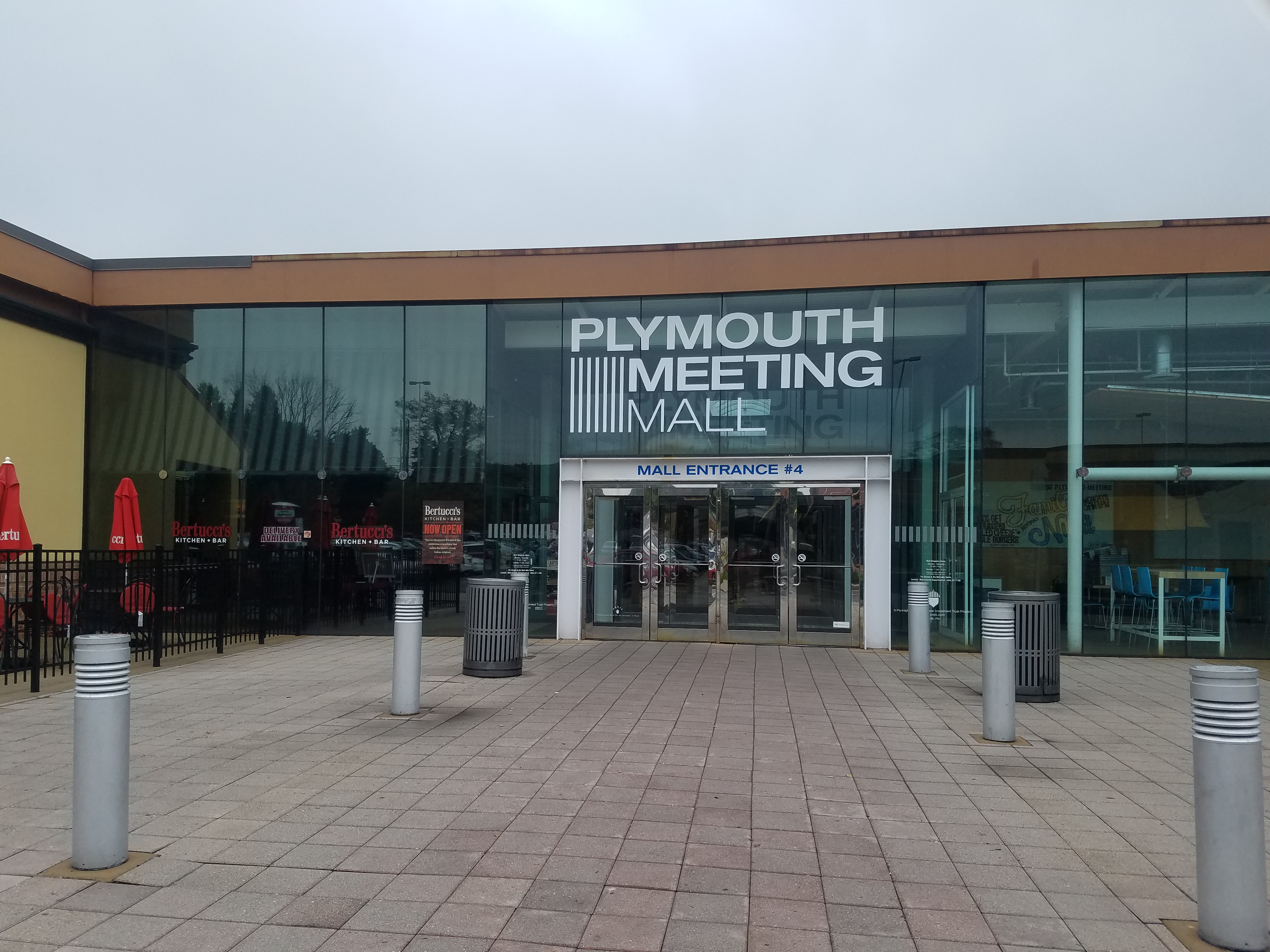
- Mall entrance in 2018
- Location: Plymouth Meeting, Pennsylvania, U.S.
- Coordinates: 40.1162°N 75.2820°W
- Address: 500 West Germantown Pike
- Opened: October 10, 1966; 60 years ago
- Closed: 2028 (expected for potential redevelopment)
- Developer: The Rouse Company
- Manager: PREIT Realty
- Owner: PREIT; Lubert-Adler Partners
- Architect: Victor Gruen & Associates
- Num. of stores: 70+
- Num. of anchor tenants: 8
- Floor area: 948,000 square feet (88,100 m^{2})
- Floors: 2 (3 in former Macy's)
- Parking: Parking lot, plus parking garage under Whole Foods
- Public transit: SEPTA bus: 27, 51, 90, 95, 98, 150
- Website: shopplymouthmeetingmall.com

The Plymouth Meeting Mall is a 948,000 square feet (88,100 m^{2}) shopping mall that is located in the community of Plymouth Meeting in Plymouth Township, Pennsylvania, approximately 17 miles (27 km) northwest of Center City, Philadelphia.

It is situated at the intersection Germantown Pike and Hickory Road, near the Mid-County Interchange between the Pennsylvania Turnpike (I-276) and the Northeast Extension/Blue Route (I-476).

This mall, which was developed by TRC Exton Plymouth 12–39, LLC, a subsidiary of The Rouse Company in 1966, features a fountain and a carousel. It was also one of the first malls in North America which, among its mixture of various stores, offered a church within the mall. It is owned and managed by PREIT, but they are selling the mall to Lubert Adler Partners, who plans to replace the mall with a mixed-use development.

== History ==
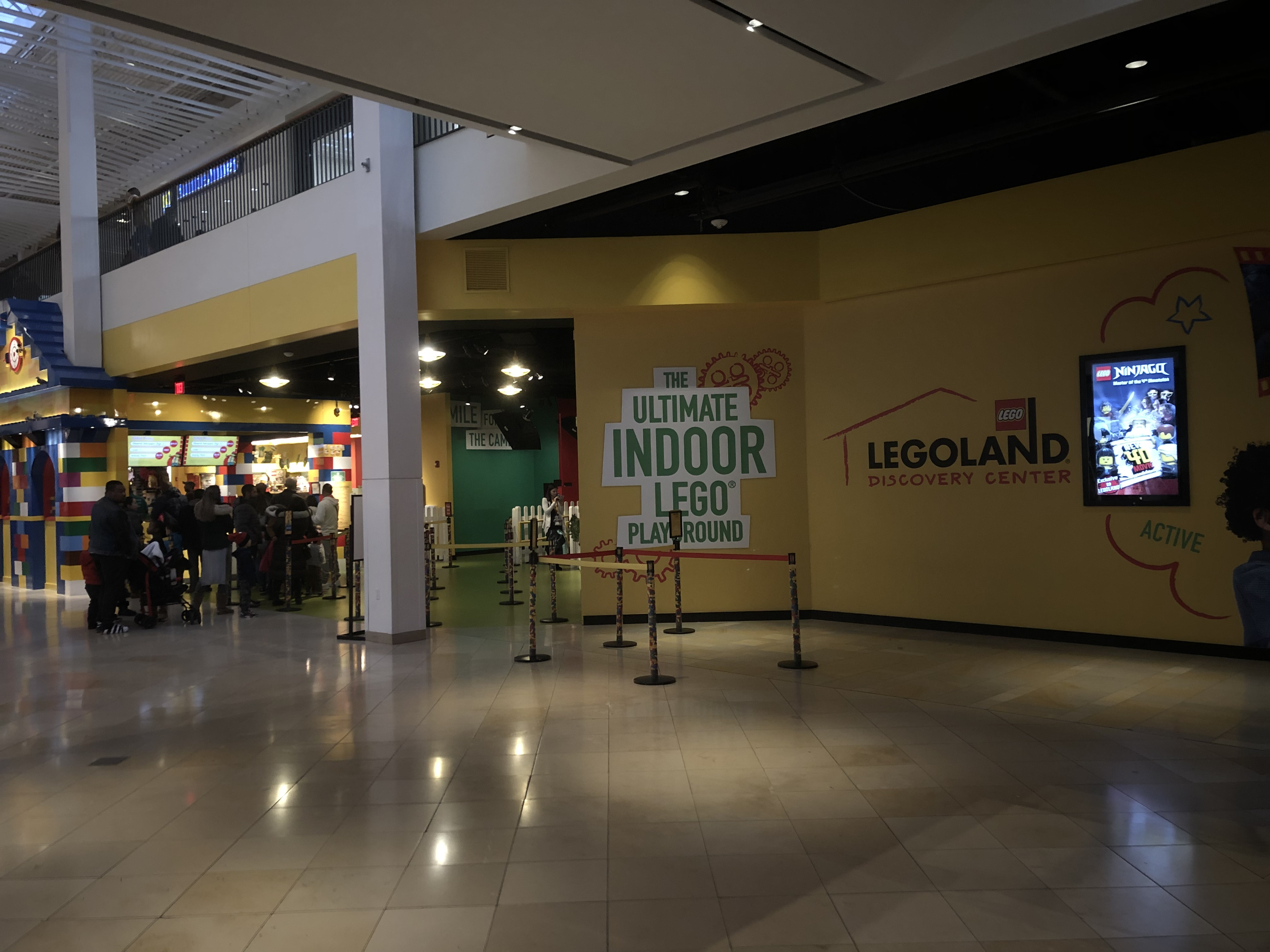
Legoland inside the mall in 2018

The Plymouth Meeting Mall was designed by Victor Gruen and developed by The Rouse Company in 1966, it was the third fully enclosed shopping mall in the Philadelphia area. The original two anchor stores were Strawbridge & Clothier and Lit Brothers. The One Plymouth Meeting office tower was added on an outparcel in 1969. A major fire damaged the north end of the mall on January 10, 1970. Lit Brothers closed in 1976 and was replaced by Hess's in 1979. The Hess's, which was the only location in the Philadelphia area, saw poor sales and closed in March 1993 as part of restructuring of the Allentown-based chain. The former Hess's became Boscov's on October 13, 1996.

In 2003, The Rouse Company sold the Plymouth Meeting Mall along with the Cherry Hill Mall, Echelon Mall (renamed Voorhees Town Center in 2007), Exton Square Mall, Moorestown Mall, and The Gallery at Market East to PREIT for $548 million. In 2005, Federated Department Stores purchased May Department Stores, the owners of Strawbridge's, and converted several Strawbridge's locations to Macy's, including the store at Plymouth Meeting Mall. Strawbridge's became Macy's in 2006.

A redevelopment of over $100 million in 2007-2009 added new restaurants and an open-air "Lifestyle" wing featuring LOFT, Coldwater Creek (since closed), Jos. A. Bank (since closed), Chico's and Olly Shoes (since closed). During the redevelopment, in April 2009, a two-story chain arcade called Krazy City was constructed in the mall's interior, near Boscov's, taking up several store spaces. A 65,000-square-foot (6,000 m^{2}) Whole Foods upscale grocery market was included in the redevelopment and anchors the "Outdoor Lifestyle Wing" of the property, which also includes an underground parking area. Previously, this location gained fame in 1985 when Swedish furniture company IKEA purchased and renovated an outparcel space for its first U.S. location. IKEA later moved in early 2003 to its current site at 400 Alan Wood Road, off of Interstate 476 (the "Blue Route") in nearby Conshohocken.

In 2015, Mercy Suburban Hospital was sold to Prime Healthcare Services, which re-branded the hospital and renamed the center Suburban Health Center.

In 2015, it was announced that a 33,000-square-foot (3,100 m^{2}) Legoland Discovery Center would be constructed at the Plymouth Meeting Mall, replacing a portion of the food court. Construction began in the summer of 2016 and Legoland opened in April 2017.

In July 2017, it was announced that a 5 Wits amusement center would open on the lower level of the mall, just across from Legoland Discovery Center, taking up almost five store spaces. The 5 Wits center opened on October 20, 2017 and closed January 2020.

In August 2018, it was announced that Burlington, Dick's Sporting Goods, Michaels, and Edge Fitness would occupy the former Macy's space, with all tenants opening in October 2019.

As of 2022, PREIT is attempting to get approval for a 503-unit apartment community to be built on the mall property. This was later approved with construction starting in 2025.

=== Pending redevelopment ===
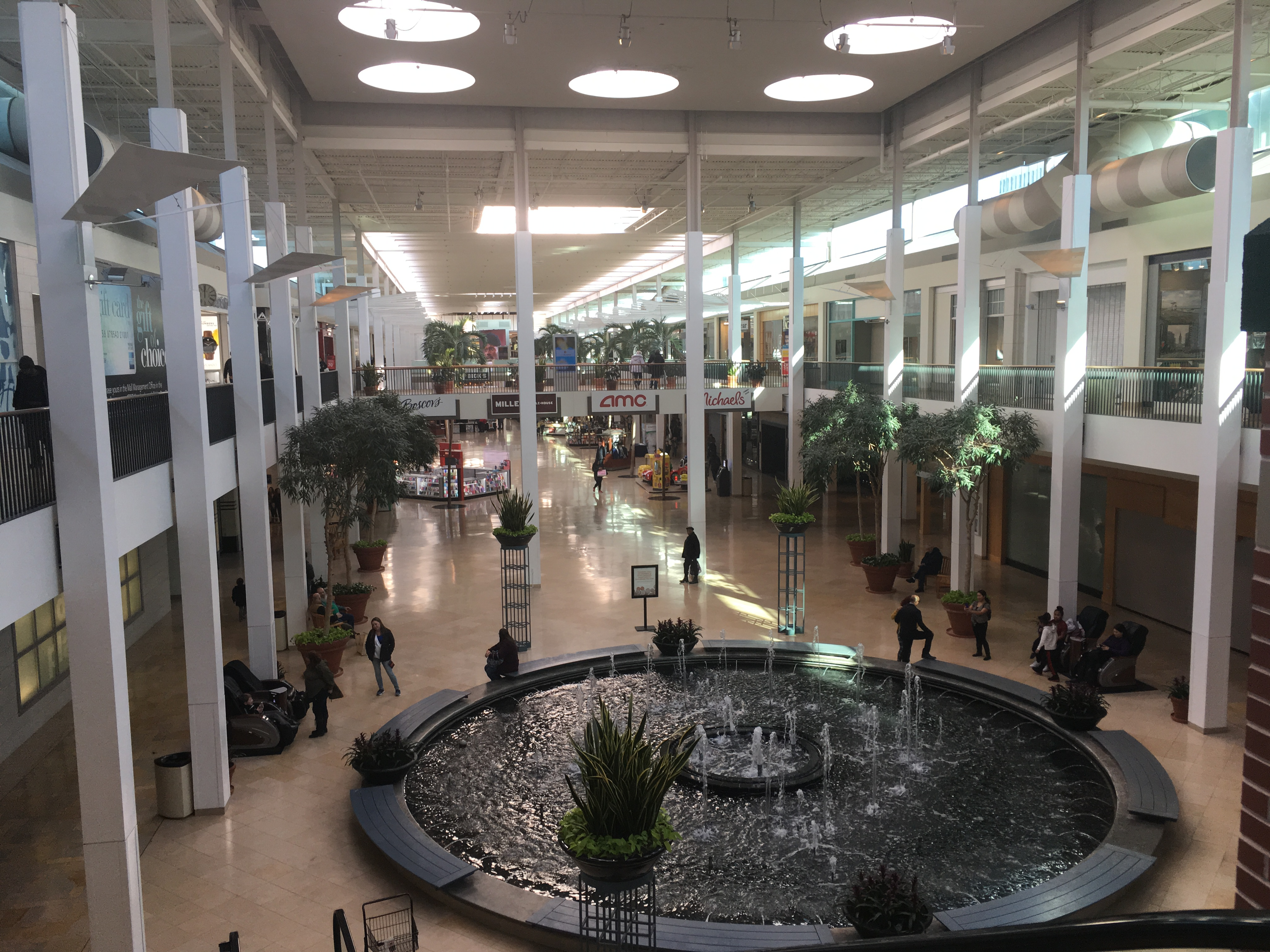
Second floor of the mall, looking from Burlington, in 2020

In recent years, the interior of the Plymouth Meeting Mall has seen an increase in vacancies, with sales of $320 per square foot in the three months ended September 2015. The rise in vacancies is due to declining mall traffic and competition from the larger King of Prussia Mall located less than 10 miles (16 km) away and the Willow Grove Park Mall located 13 miles (21 km) away. In 2019, the non-anchor occupancy rate was 81.3%.

In December 2009, Krazy City closed its doors in accordance with the chain's folding. In 2012, its space was converted to Mercy Health Center as part of Mercy Suburban Hospital. In late 2013, a casual Mexican chain restaurant opened in the second floor mall entrance wing next to Macy's and across from Dave & Busters, called Uncle Julio's.

On January 4, 2017, Suburban Health Center was announced to have closed. On the same day, Macy's announced that its store would be closing in spring 2017 as part of a plan to close 68 stores nationwide. On January 28, 2017, Uncle Julio's closed its restaurant. On March 26, 2017, Macy's officially closed its store.

5 Wits closed in 2020.

In November 2025, it was announced that Plymouth Meeting Mall was under contract to be sold to Lubert Adler Partners in February 2026, who plans to demolish and redevelop the mall into the Plymouth Meeting Town Center. Under this plan, the interior of the mall between Boscov's and Dick's Sporting Goods is planned to be demolished, with construction planned to begin in 2027 and be finished in 2028.

Despite being up for sale, as of March 2026 the mall's official website still mentions PREIT.

As of February 2026, a 12-story office tower connected to the mall is being renovated into apartments, and is expected to open later this year. The plan is for at least 275 apartments with potential plans for more.

== January 1970 fire ==
Plymouth Meeting Mall suffered a major fire on January 10, 1970 at the east end (near Lit Brothers): "Approximately one third of the 100 stores in the suburban Philadelphia mall were damaged by either smoke, water or the fire." The fire began around 10:00 a.m. EST on a Saturday in the display window of King's Men's Shop on the mall's lower level. Mr. Capodici, an employee, along with Rouse executives, reported hearing a loud "pop" after turning on the store lights, which ignited the display case.

The first emergency call wasn't made until 10:23 a.m. EST. Many witnesses stood and watched the fire spread, assuming someone else had already called the fire department.

Approximately 1/3 of the mall (about 30 stores) was destroyed or heavily damaged by fire, smoke, and water. The heat was intense enough to buckle steel and cause roof collapses.

The fire was partially extinguished when the mall's fire sprinkler system and a water curtain deluge system in Strawbridge & Clothier activated at one of the mall's entrances. However, Plymouth Meeting Mall's sprinkler system was not fully automatic. After the incident, The Rouse Company immediately responded with major repairs and reconstruction, which was completed by 1972.

== Notable features ==
Plymouth Meeting Mall currently contains more than seventy specialty stores and restaurants, including a central Food Court, and outlying restaurants California Pizza Kitchen, P.F. Chang's, Redstone American Grill, Dave & Buster's, and Benihana. Its original anchor stores Strawbridge & Clothier and Lit Brothers are now occupied by Burlington, Dick's Sporting Goods, Michaels, and Edge Fitness, which all occupy an anchor space that was Macy's until 2017, and Boscov's. The Boscov's site was home to one of the largest branches of Hess's until 1993.

There is also a 48,000 square feet (4,500 m^{2}) AMC Theatre on the property, featuring twelve screens and stadium seating.

The mall is recognizable from a considerable distance away due to an adjoining nine-story office tower, One Plymouth Meeting. The tower, containing 167,748 square feet (15,584.3 m^{2}) of office space, was managed by Mack-Cali Realty Corporation.

The mall is currently anchored by Boscov's, Burlington, Dick's Sporting Goods, Michaels, Edge Fitness, Whole Foods Market and an AMC Theatre.

== See also ==
- Franklin Mall, also slated for redevelopment by Dean Adler
