= Plymouth Township, Montgomery County, Pennsylvania =

Township in Pennsylvania, US

Plymouth Township
- Home-rule township
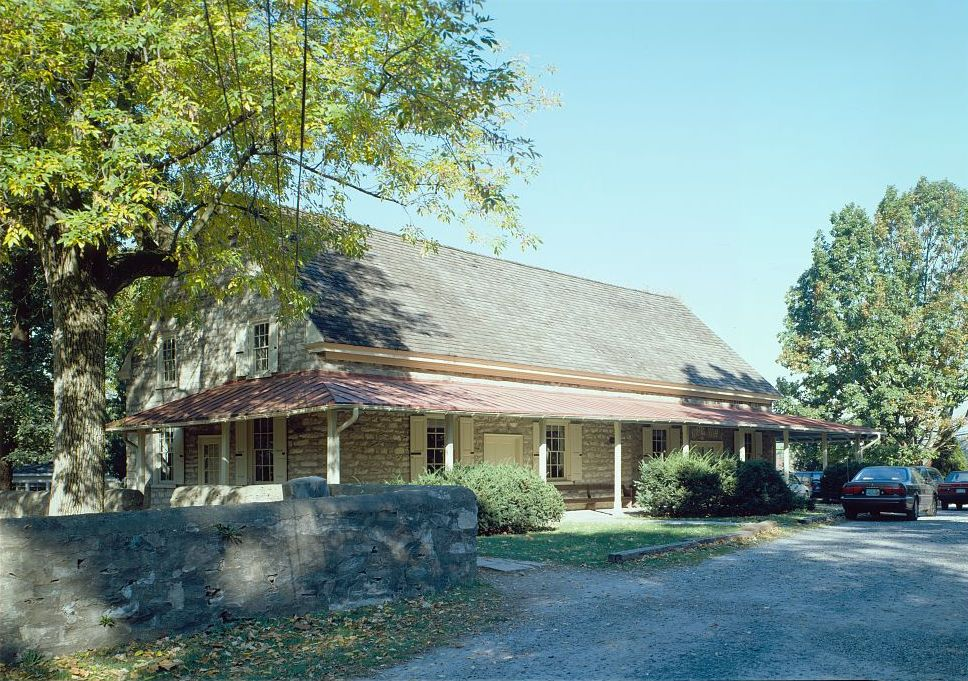
- Plymouth Friends Meetinghouse, built in 1708

- Flag Seal

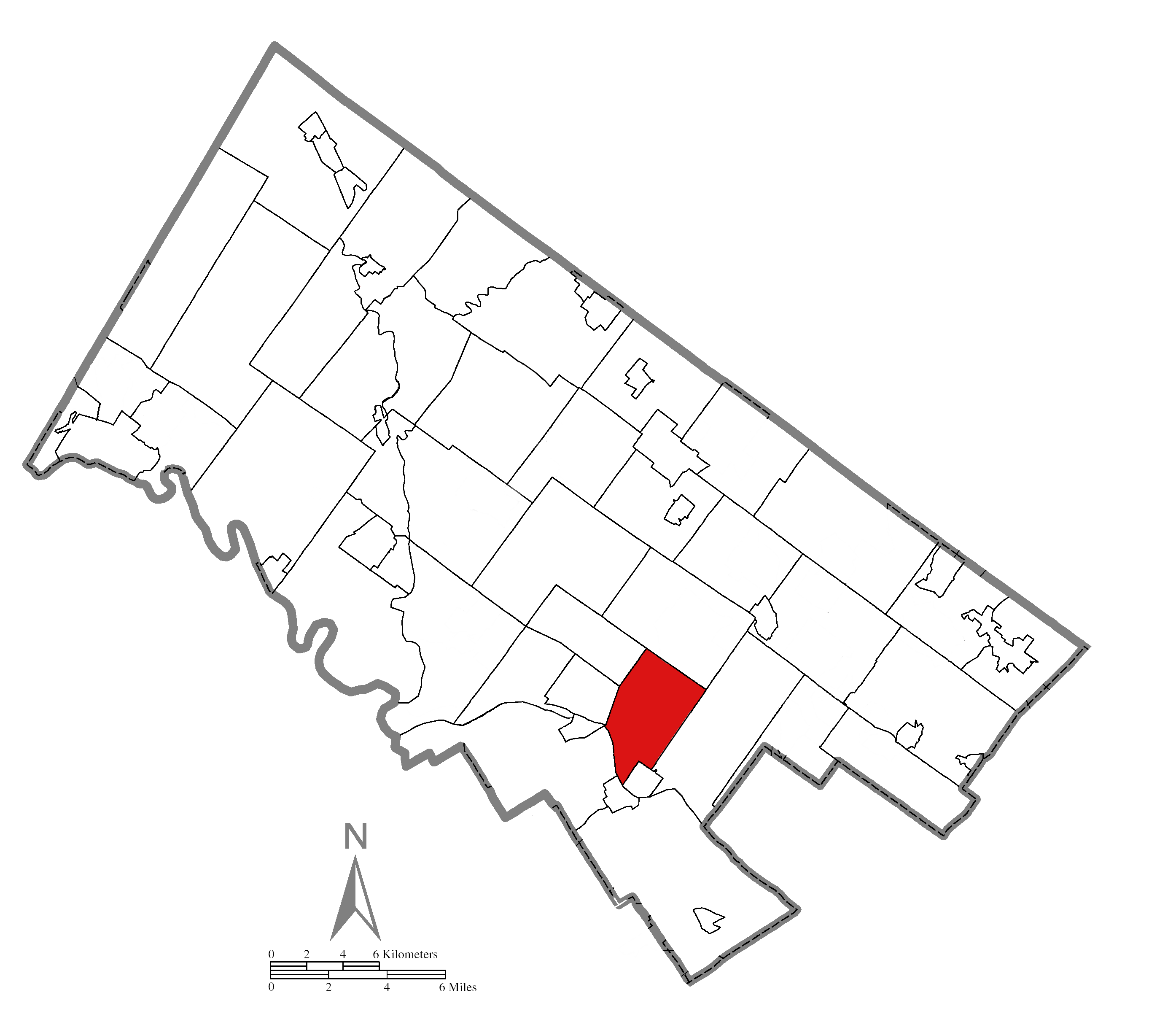
- Location of Plymouth Township in Montgomery County, Pennsylvania
- Coordinates: 40°08′00″N 75°17′29″W
- Country: United States
- State: Pennsylvania
- County: Montgomery
- Founded: 1686

Government
  - Type: Council-manager
  - Body: Township Council
  - Chair: Lynne Viscio
  - Township Manager: Matt West

Area
  - Total: 8.49 sq mi (21.99 km^{2})
  - Land: 8.39 sq mi (21.73 km^{2})
  - Water: 0.10 sq mi (0.26 km^{2})
- Elevation: 249 ft (76 m)

Population (2010)
  - Total: 16,525
  - Estimate (2016): 17,642
  - Density: 2,102.5/sq mi (811.77/km^{2})
- Time zone: UTC-5 (EST)
  - Summer (DST): UTC-4 (EDT)
- ZIP Codes: 19462; 19428; 19422
- Area codes: 484 and 610
- FIPS code: 42-091-61664
- Website: www.plymouthtownship.org

Plymouth Township is a township with home rule status in Montgomery County, Pennsylvania. The township has been governed by a home rule charter since 1976 and is no longer subject to the Pennsylvania Township Code. The population was 16,525 at the 2010 census. It is serviced by the Colonial School District and is home to the Plymouth Meeting Mall.

== History ==
Plymouth Meeting, a census-designated place (CDP) that straddles Plymouth and Whitemarsh Townships, was settled by English Quakers in 1686. The Cold Point Historic District was listed on the National Register of Historic Places in 1983.

== Geography ==
According to the U.S. Census Bureau, the township has a total area of 8.5 square miles (22.1 km^{2}), of which 8.4 square miles (21.8 km^{2}) is land and 0.1 square mile (0.3 km^{2}) (1.41%) is water. Plymouth Township straddles the boundary between a hot-summer humid continental climate (Dfa) and a humid subtropical climate (Cfa). The hardiness zone is 7a. It is drained by the Schuylkill River, which forms most of its southwestern boundary.

== Transportation ==
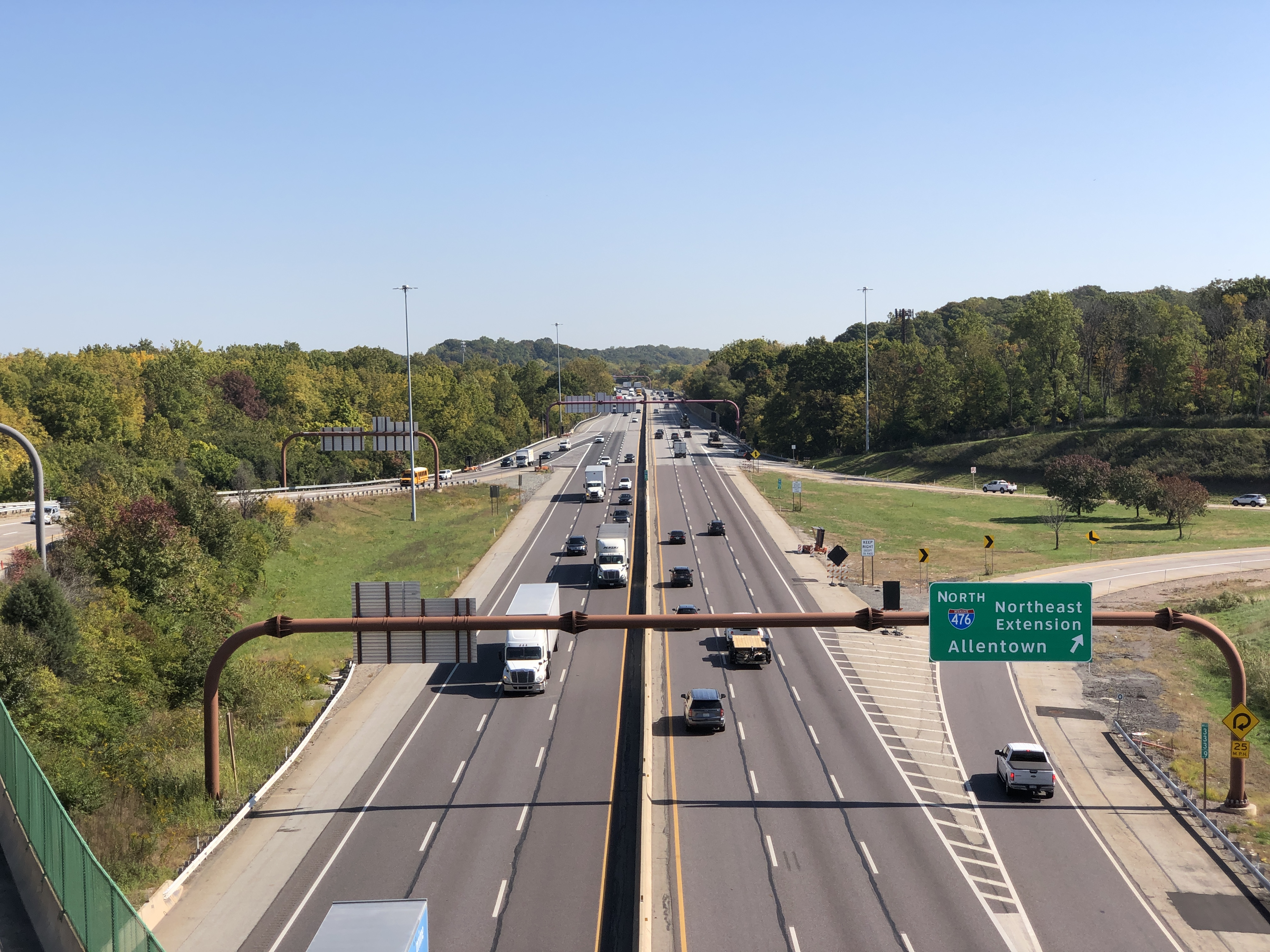
I-276/Pennsylvania Turnpike eastbound at I-476/Pennsylvania Turnpike Northeast Extension in Plymouth Township

As of 2018 there were 67.50 miles (108.63 km) of public roads in Plymouth Township, of which 5.80 miles (9.33 km) were maintained by the Pennsylvania Turnpike Commission (PTC), 13.52 miles (21.76 km) were maintained by the Pennsylvania Department of Transportation (PennDOT) and 48.18 miles (77.54 km) were maintained by the township.

Plymouth Township is the location of one of the major highway junctions of the Philadelphia metropolitan area, the interchange of the Pennsylvania Turnpike (I-276) and the "Blue Route" and the Pennsylvania Turnpike Northeast Extension (I-476). The east-west Pennsylvania Turnpike (I-276) traverses the central portion of the township on a southwest-northeast alignment. The "Blue Route" (I-476) enters the far southern corner of the township on a southwest-northeast as well, but turns more northerly and meets the east-west Turnpike in the eastern portion of the township. From there, I-476 follows the turnpike's Northeast Extension on a southeast-northwest alignment up to the northern corner of the township before exiting.

SEPTA provides bus service to Plymouth Township along City Bus routes 27 and 51 and Suburban Bus routes 90, 95, 97, 98, and 150, serving points of interest in the township and offering connections to Philadelphia and other suburbs. SEPTA Regional Rail's Manayunk/Norristown Line passes through the township but does not have any stations within it; the nearest stations are Conshohocken station and Norristown Transportation Center.

== Demographics ==
Historical population
| Census | Pop. | Note | %± |
|---|---|---|---|
| 1930 | 4,369 | | — |
| 1940 | 4,380 | | 0.3% |
| 1950 | 5,118 | | 16.8% |
| 1960 | 11,430 | | 123.3% |
| 1970 | 16,911 | | 48.0% |
| 1980 | 17,168 | | 1.5% |
| 1990 | 15,985 | | −6.9% |
| 2000 | 16,045 | | 0.4% |
| 2010 | 16,525 | | 3.0% |
| 2020 | 18,256 | | 10.5% |

As of the 2010 census, Plymouth Township was 83.1% White, 7.0% Black or African American, 0.1% Native American, 7.2% Asian, and 1.7% were two or more races. 2.6% of the population were of Hispanic or Latino ancestry.

As of the 2000 census, there were 16,045 people, 6,512 households, and 4,363 families residing in the township. The population density was 1,907.3 inhabitants per square mile (736.4/km^{2}). There were 6,703 housing units at an average density of 796.8 per square mile (307.6/km^{2}). The racial makeup of the township was 89.26% White, 4.17% African American, 0.09% Native American, 5.22% Asian, 0.01% Pacific Islander, 0.37% from other races, and 0.89% from two or more races. Hispanic or Latino of any race were 1.25% of the population.

There were 6,512 households, out of which 25.1% had children under the age of 18 living with them, 55.0% were married couples living together, 8.6% had a female householder with no husband present, and 33.0% were non-families. 26.6% of all households were made up of individuals, and 11.2% had someone living alone who was 65 years of age or older. The average household size was 2.43 and the average family size was 2.97.

In the township, the population was spread out, with 20.1% under the age of 18, 7.2% from 18 to 24, 29.6% from 25 to 44, 23.9% from 45 to 64, and 19.2% who were 65 years of age or older. The median age was 41 years. For every 100 females there were 94.7 males. For every 100 females age 18 and over, there were 91.2 males.

The median income for a household in the township was $54,069, and the median income for a family was $66,938. Males had a median income of $45,953 versus $35,089 for females. The per capita income for the township was $28,862. About 2.4% of families and 4.3% of the population were below the poverty line, including 3.3% of those under age 18 and 4.2% of those age 65 or over.

== Government and politics ==
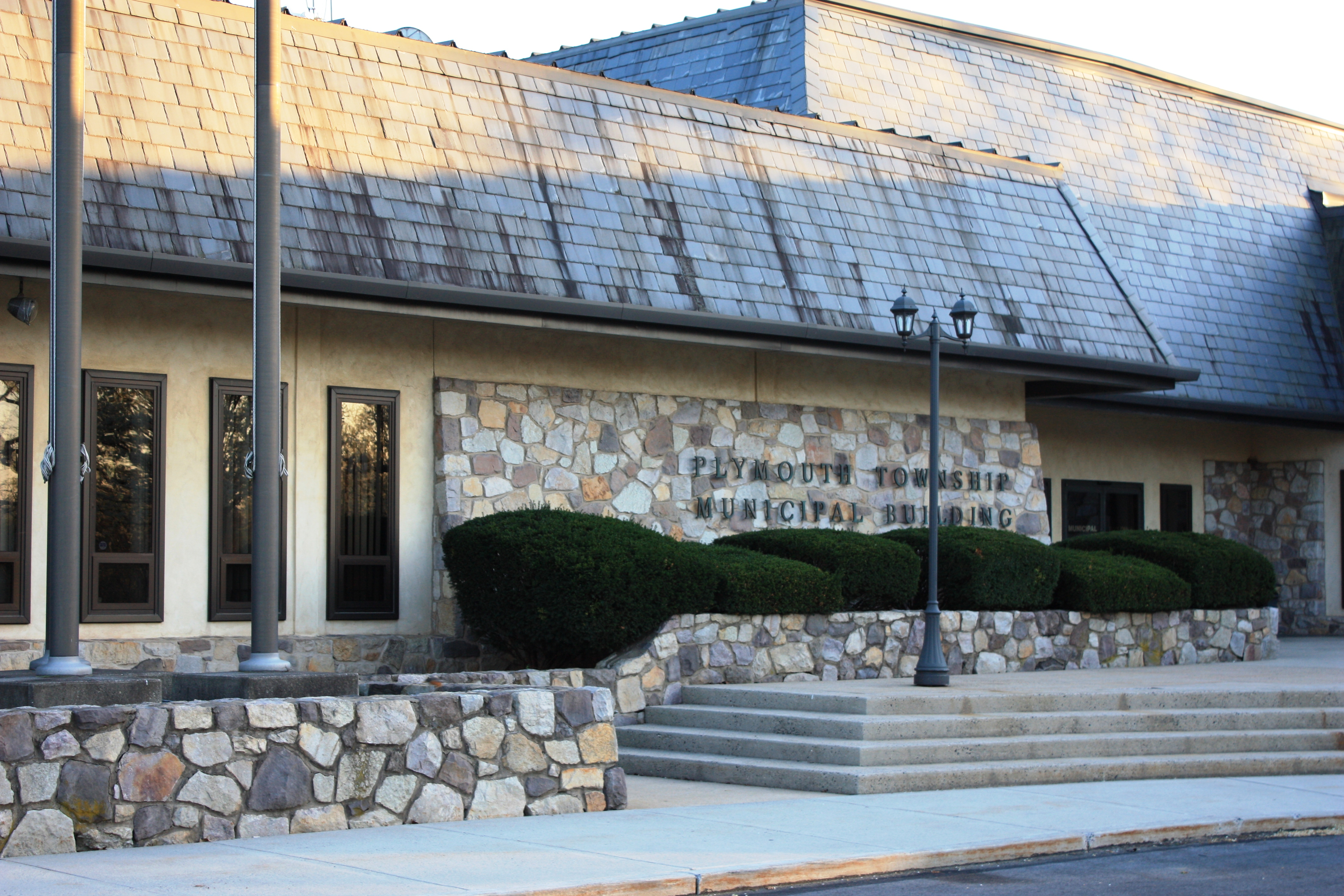
Plymouth Township municipal building

Presidential elections results
| Year | Republican | Democratic |
|---|---|---|
| 2020 | 37.1% 4,045 | 62.1% 6,769 |
| 2016 | 37.9% 3,633 | 58.4% 5,598 |
| 2012 | 42.5% 3,719 | 56.3% 4,932 |
| 2008 | 40.1% 3,588 | 59.2% 5,298 |
| 2004 | 43.1% 3,681 | 56.6% 4,827 |
| 2000 | 41.4% 3,070 | 56.5% 4,186 |
| 1996 | 37.2% 2,485 | 52.5% 3,509 |
| 1992 | 37.7% 2,863 | 45.8% 3,481 |

Plymouth Township is governed by a five-member Council, elected to staggered four-year terms; four Council members are elected by district and one is elected at-large. Council establishes the policies, goals and objectives for the Executive, Administrative, and Advisory functions. Council Members are limited by the Home Rule Charter to two consecutive terms plus the balance of an unexpired term.

The township is part of the Fourth Congressional District, represented by Madeleine Dean. It is in the 54th State House District, represented by Greg Scott, and the 12th State Senate District, represented by Maria Collett.

== Education ==
Colonial School District is the local school district.

Holy Rosary Regional Catholic School in Plymouth Meeting and Plymouth Township is the area Catholic school. It was formed in 2012 by the merger of Epiphany of Our Lord School in Plymouth Meeting, Our Lady of Victory in East Norriton Township, and St. Titus in Norristown.
