= Colonial School District (Pennsylvania) =

School district in Pennsylvania

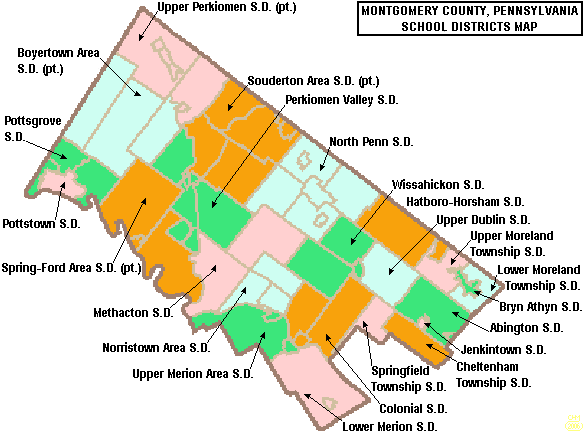

Address
- 230 Flourtown Road Plymouth Meeting, Montgomery County, Pennsylvania, 19462; United States

District information
- Type: Public
- School board: Nine members elected at-large

Students and staff
- Colors: Red White and Blue

Other information
- Website: www.colonialsd.org

The Colonial School District serves the Borough of Conshohocken and the Townships of Plymouth and Whitemarsh in Montgomery County, Pennsylvania.

The district operates Plymouth-Whitemarsh High School (9th-12th), Central Montco Technical High School (9th-12th), Colonial Middle School (6th-8th), Colonial Elementary School (4th-5th), Conshohocken Elementary School (K-3rd), Plymouth Elementary School (K-3rd), Ridge Park Elementary School (K-3rd) and Whitemarsh Elementary School (K-3rd).
