= Plymouth Meeting Historic District =

Historic district in Pennsylvania, United States

- U.S. National Register of Historic Places
- U.S. Historic district
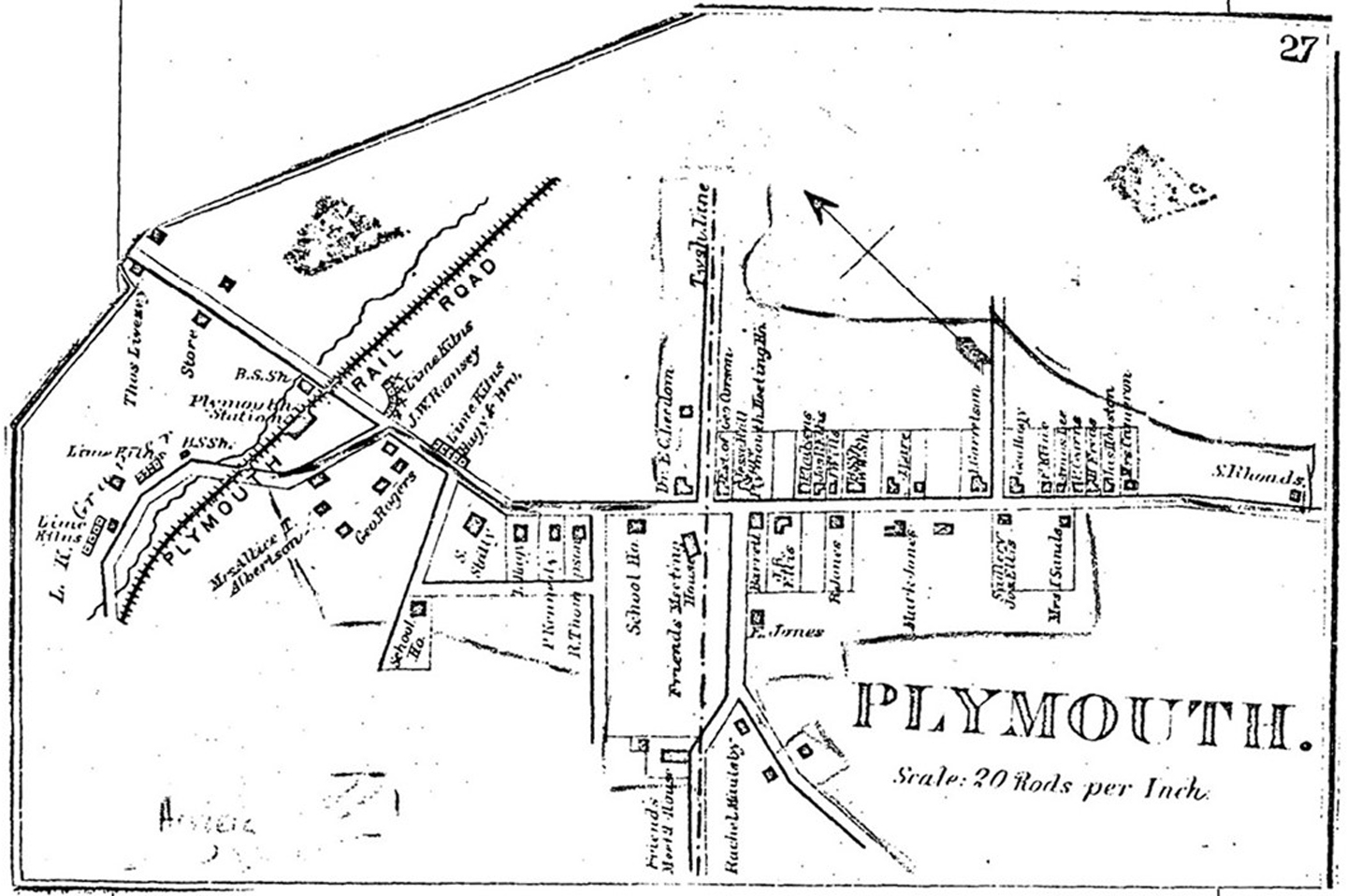
- 1871 G. M. Hopkins Atlas, plate 27: Plymouth. Germantown Pike is the horizontal road at center; Butler Pike is the vertical road.

- Location within Pennsylvania Location within the United States
- Location: Plymouth Meeting; Plymouth and Whitemarsh Townships, Pennsylvania
- Coordinates: 40°06′09.5″N 75°16′43″W
- Area: 200 acres (81 ha)
- Architect: Multiple
- Architectural style: Mixed (more than 2 styles from different periods)
- NRHP reference No.: 71000715
- Added to NRHP: February 18, 1971

Plymouth Meeting Historic District is a national historic district that straddles Plymouth and Whitemarsh Townships in Montgomery County, Pennsylvania, United States. The adjacent Cold Point Historic District is north of it.

The district encompasses 200 acres (81 ha) and includes 56 contributing buildings in the historic core of Plymouth Meeting. Among these are the separately-listed Plymouth Friends Meetinghouse (1708); Hinterleiter House (c.1714); Livezey House and Store (c.1740–1788); Hovenden House, Barn and Abolition Hall (c.1795, 1856); and Plymouth Meeting Country Store and Post Office (c.1827).

The district was added to the National Register of Historic Places in 1971.

Plymouth Meeting House is the name of a village situated at the intersection of the Plymouth and Perkiomen turnpikes, on the township line. On this [Plymouth] side is the meeting house, school house and four houses; and in Whitemarsh two stores, a blacksmith and wheelwright shop, post office and twenty-four houses. The houses in this village are chiefly situated along the Perkiomen or Reading pike, nearly adjoining one another, and being of stone, neatly white washed, with shady yards in front, present to the stranger an agreeable appearance. In the basement of the Library building the Methodists hold worship. This is an ancient settlement, whose history dates back nearly to the arrival of William Penn, and is marked as a village on Lewis Evans' map of 1749. The post office was established here before 1827. In 1832 there were but ten houses here. — History of Montgomery County (1858).

== Contributing properties (alphabetical by street) ==
Separately NRHP-listed properties are shaded in blue.

Name	Image	Address	Built	Notes
Part of Maple Hill (see 3047 Spring Mill Road, below)		opposite 2070 Butler Pike	c.1794	
Journey's End; Thomas White House; Plymouth Friends School		2150 Butler Pike	c.1827	
		3134 Butler Pike		
		3136 Butler Pike	1898	
Ellwood Jones House		3138 Butler Pike		1871 – E. Jones
Maulsby Barn and Abolition Hall (see Hovenden House, 1 E. Germantown Pike, also part of the property, below)		4006 Butler Pike	c.1795 1856	Samuel Maulsby built the stone barn, c.1795. His son-in-law George Corson built Abolition Hall, 1856. 1871 – Estate of George Corson; Abolition Hall, left, c.1906.
Hiram Blee & Company Lime Kilns		opposite 4044 Butler Pike		Demolished by Danella Companies, Inc., Spring 2019, to make way for additional truck parking.
		4066 Butler Pike		
G. & W. H. Corson Company offices		opposite 4200 Butler Pike		
Hovenden House; Samuel Maulsby House; Maulsby-Corson-Hovenden House		1 E. Germantown Pike; NE corner Germantown & Butler Pikes	c.1795	Built by Samuel Maulsby. 1871 – Estate of George Corson; The rear ell incorporates the stone walls of an earlier house.
Barrett House		2 E. Germantown Pike; SE corner Germantown & Butler Pikes		1871 – Barrett
Plymouth Meeting Country Store and Post Office		3-5 E. Germantown Pike	c.1826-1827	Built by Samuel Maulsby. His son Jonathan served as Plymouth Meeting's first postmaster. 1871 – Jesse Hall Store/Plymouth Meeting P. O. Hall's Store circa 1900:
Jones-Williams House		4 E. Germantown Pike	c.1787	1871 – J. R. Ellis
		6 E. Germantown Pike		
Jonathon Jones House		8 E. Germantown Pike	1854	1871 – R. Jones
George Hitner Residence		12 E. Germantown Pike		1871 – Mark Jones; George Hitner was issued a license to operate an inn in 1778.
Hitner Barn "The Barn at 14 East"		14 E. Germantown Pike	c.1714	
Killmer Dwelling		15 E. Germantown Pike	c.1838	1871 – P. Lukens
Joseph R. Ellis House		17 E. Germantown Pike	1841	1871 – Jos. R. Ellis
Schlatter House		19 E. Germantown Pike (left half)	1835	1871 – S. Sh. [Seth Schlatter?]
Schlatter House		21 E. Germantown Pike (right half)	1835	1871 – W. W. Sh. [William Schlatter?]
Joel Lare House		27 E. Germantown Pike	1800	1871 – J. Lare; Lare was a blacksmith and minister. The 1871 G. W. Hopkins Atlas shows a small building east of his house, possibly his blacksmith shop.
Isaac Garretson House		37 E. Germantown Pike		1871 – I. Garretson
George Hagy House		41 E. Germantown Pike	1850	1871 – Geo. Hagy
Plymouth Meeting Evangelical Congregational Church		42 E. Germantown Pike	1876-1883	"An Evangelical meeting-house was commenced here in 1876, but not dedicated until July 22, 1883. It is a two-story stone edifice, with a capacity to seat five hundred persons."
Frederick R. Freas House		43-45 E. Germantown Pike	1840	1871 – F. R. Freas
Annis Lee House		47 E. Germantown Pike		1871 – Annis Lee
Cairns [Carns?] House		49 E. Germantown Pike (left half)	1841	1871 – P. Cairns
Henry Freas House		51 E. Germantown Pike (right half)	1841	1871 – H. Freas
James Houston House		53 E. Germantown Pike	1824	1871 – Jas. Houston
Willaman Residence		55 E. Germantown Pike	c.1844	1871 – Mrs. Cameron
Andrew Norney House; Sabia House		94 E. Germantown Pike	c.1849	1871 – I. Sands
John Knight House		107 E. Germantown Pike	c.1737	1871 – S. Rhoads
Elizabeth Williams House		113 E. Germantown Pike		
13 to Philadelphia Milepost		NW corner Germantown & Butler Pikes		
Plymouth Friends Meetinghouse		SW corner Germantown & Butler Pikes	1708	1871 – Friends Meeting House
Plymouth Friends Meeting Campus – Old School House			c.1866 2nd story 1900	1871 – School Ho.
Plymouth Friends Meeting Campus – William Jeanes Memorial Library			1935	Designed by Muhlenberg Brothers, architects.
Leedom House; Dr. Joseph Leedom; Dr. Edwin C. Leedom		2 W. Germantown Pike; NW corner Germantown & Butler Pikes	c.1803	1871 – Dr. E. C. Leedom; Dr. Joseph Leedom established his practice in Plymouth Meeting in 1803. His son and grandson also became physicians. Leedom Springhouse:
R. Thompson House		111 W. Germantown Pike (on left)	1870	1871 – R. Thompson
Archbishop Thomas Kennedy Birthplace; Patrick Kennedy House		113 W. Germantown Pike (on right)	c.1776	1871 – P. Kennedy
J. Hagy House		119 W. Germantown Pike		1871 – J. Hagy
Staley House		125-27 W. Germantown Pike		1871 – S. Stally
George Hagy & Brother Lime Kilns		130 W. Germantown Pike		1871 – Lime Kilns/Hagy & Bro.
George Rogers House		139 W. Germantown Pike	1875-1876	1871 – Geo. Rogers
J. W. Ramsey Lime Kilns		200 W. Germantown Pike (at Chemical Road)		1871 – Lime Kilns/J. W. Ramsey
Thomas Livezey House and Store		225 W. Germantown Pike	c.1740 1788	1871 – Thos. Livezey/Store
		14 Marple Lane		
Marple House		20 Marple Lane	c.1840	Features a summer kitchen and smokehouse
Plymouth School House; Williams School		119 W. Meeting House Lane	1837	
Kirk Residence		127 W. Meeting House Lane	c.1848	1871 – School Ho. [This may be an error in the 1871 atlas.]
Linden Grove; Bellfield; Peter & Mary Dager House		101 E. Ridge Pike; NE corner Ridge Pike & Spring Mill Road	1790; 1810; 1829-1832	
Dickinson House and Barn; Hinterleiter House		2130 Sierra Road; 2181 Chemical Road	1715	Features a dwelling, barn, summer kitchen & smokehouse. Headquarters of the Plymouth Meeting Historical Society
Albertson Farm House		2130 Sierra Road; 2181 Chemical Road	c.1810	1871 – Mrs. Allice T. Albertson [widow of Josiah Albertson]
Jacob Deeves Residence		3033 Spring Mill Road	c.1790	
Part of Maple Hill		3037 Spring Mill Road	1811	
Maple Hill; Dr. Hiram Corson Residence		3047 Spring Mill Road	1833	Dr. Hiram Corson shared a medical office with Dr. Joseph Leedom in the Leedom House, at 2 W. Germantown Pike, before establishing a medical office here in his own house. Garden house and carriage house:
		3118 Spring Mill Road		
		3127 Spring Mill Road		
		3137 Spring Mill Road		Shown on the 1871 G. W. Hopkins Atlas.
		3138 Spring Mill Road		Shown on the 1871 G. W. Hopkins Atlas.
Samuel Livezey House; Cook-Livezey House		3141 Spring Mill Road	1739 c.1788	1871 – Rachel Maulsby
