= Hovenden House, Barn and Abolition Hall =

Historic complex in Pennsylvania, United States

- U.S. National Register of Historic Places
- Pennsylvania state historical marker
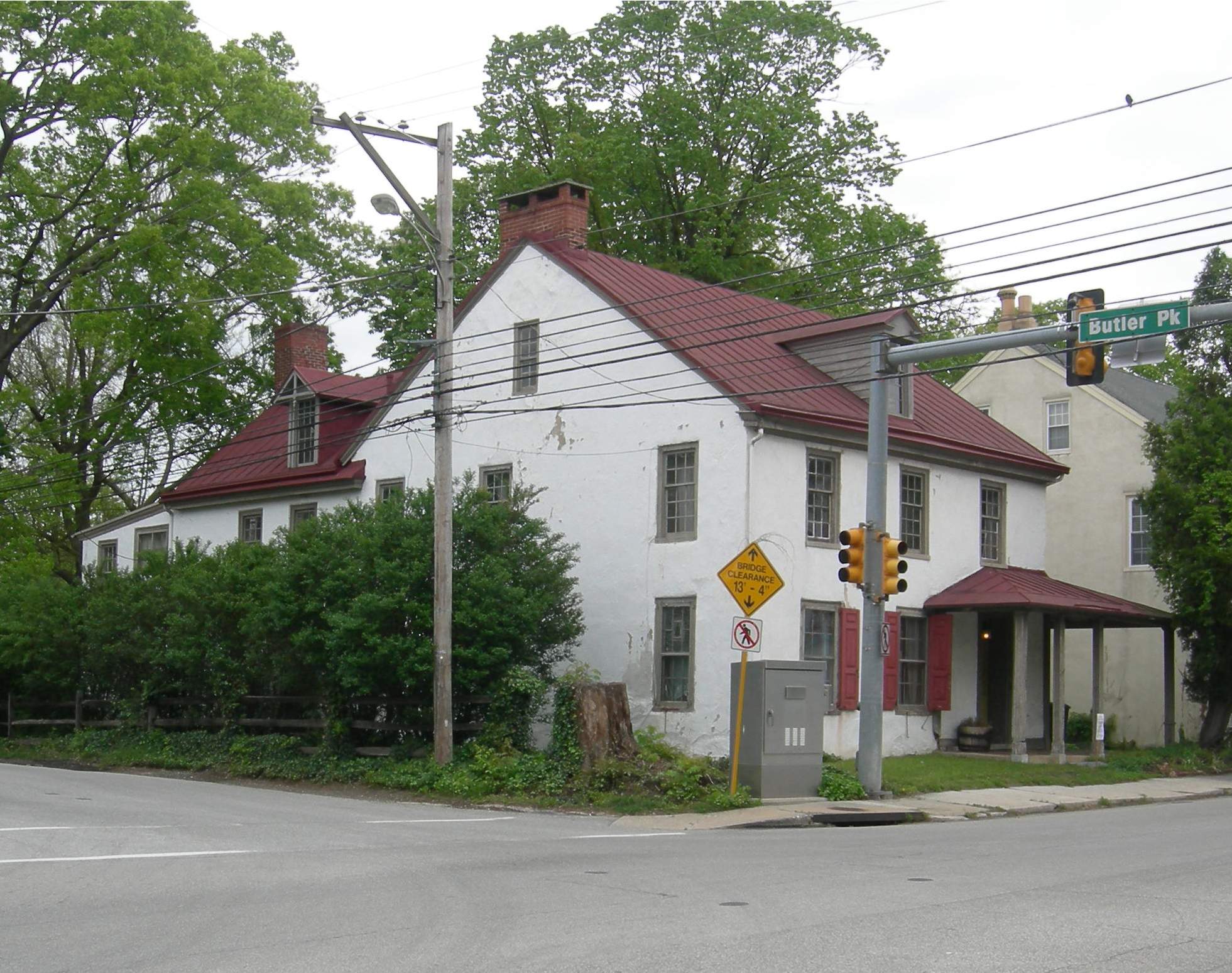
- Maulsby-Corson-Hovenden House, built c.1795.

- Location within Pennsylvania Location within the United States
- Location: 1 E. Germantown Pike, Plymouth Meeting, Whitemarsh Township, Pennsylvania
- Coordinates: 40°6′10″N 75°16′41″W
- Area: 9 acres (3.6 ha)
- Built: c.1795, 1856
- Built by: Samuel Maulsby (house & barn); George Corson (Abolition Hall)
- Architectural style: Federal
- NRHP reference No.: 71000713

Significant dates
- Added to NRHP: February 18, 1971
- Designated PHMC: November 18, 2000

Hovenden House, Barn and Abolition Hall is a group of historic buildings in Plymouth Meeting, Pennsylvania, United States. In the decades prior to the American Civil War, the property served as an important station on the Underground Railroad. Abolition Hall was built as a meeting place for abolitionists, and later became the studio of artist Thomas Hovenden.

The house is located at the northeast corner of Germantown and Butler Pikes, diagonally opposite the Plymouth Friends Meetinghouse. Northeast of the house is the stone barn, and behind and attached to the barn is the former carriage house, above which was built Abolition Hall. The three buildings are part of a 10.45-acre farm, and are contributing properties in the Plymouth Meeting Historic District.

In 2016, the property was threatened by a proposal to divide Butler Pike and reroute the northbound lanes between Hovenden House and its barn. Preservation Pennsylvania opposed this plan and added the property to its 2017 Pennsylvania At Risk list. In 2021, it was announced that Whitemarsh Township and the Whitemarsh Art Center would jointly buy the property for $3.95 million, and preserve it for use by the art center.

== History ==
The village of Plymouth Meeting was founded by a group of Quakers who arrived in Pennsylvania in 1686. The Maulsby family, which later attained local prominence, arrived in Pennsylvania in 1698, and came to Whitemarsh Township in 1705.

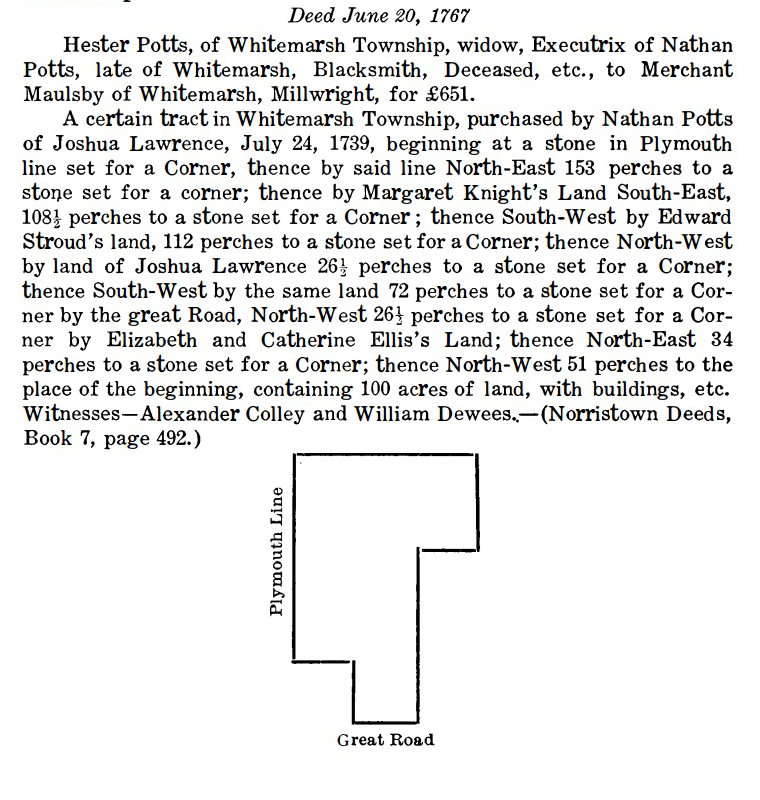
1909 facsimile of Merchant Maulsby Jr.'s 1767 deed and groundplan

On June 20, 1767, Merchant Maulsby Jr. purchased a 100-acre farm with frontage on the "Whitemarsh great road" (Germantown Pike) and the "Plymouth line" (Butler Pike), for £651. (Note: The seller was Hester Potts, widow of Nathan Potts, who had purchased the farm from Joshua Lawrence on July 24, 1739. The purchase did not include the 8.25-acre plot at the northeast corner of Germantown and Butler Pikes, which the 1767 deed described as "Elizabeth and Catherine Ellis's Land".) Merchant and his wife Hannah Davis built a two-story stone house at the north end of the property. (Note: Ella K. Barnard wrote that the "old Maultsby house" was located on a 15-acre tract "purchased by Charles Thomas at the time of the settlement of Samuel Maulsby's estate [c.1839], part of which property is now [1909] owned by David Marple." Barnard, page 143.) They had two children: Samuel and Elizabeth. Merchant Maulsby Jr. died in February 1772 at age 34.

During the early morning of May 20, 1778, ten-year-old Samuel Maulsby watched as British troops marched down Butler Pike to the meetinghouse, part of an unsuccessful attempt to surround the Marquis de Lafayette and 2,100 Continental troops at the Battle of Barren Hill. Maulsby's recollections, including his description of Redcoats looting his widowed mother's house, were recorded by John Fanning Watson in his Annals of Philadelphia (1830).

Widow Hannah Davis Maulsby married David Marple in 1781, and was soon widowed again. She married Richard Corson in 1784, with whom she had two children, Richard Jr. and Hannah II. Richard Sr. and Hannah Corson occupied her two-story stone house in Plymouth Meeting for a period, but settled in Bucks County, Pennsylvania. Samuel Dean farmed the Maulsby-Corson property in 1781; Enoch Marple farmed it in 1783; and seventeen-year-old Samuel Maulsby and his former schoolmate Joseph Corson, a nephew of Richard Corson, farmed it in 1785. Joseph Corson married Hannah Dickinson in 1786, and the young couple rented the two-story stone house until 1789. Like Samuel Maulsby, they became abolitionists, and decades later one of their sons would marry one of his daughters.

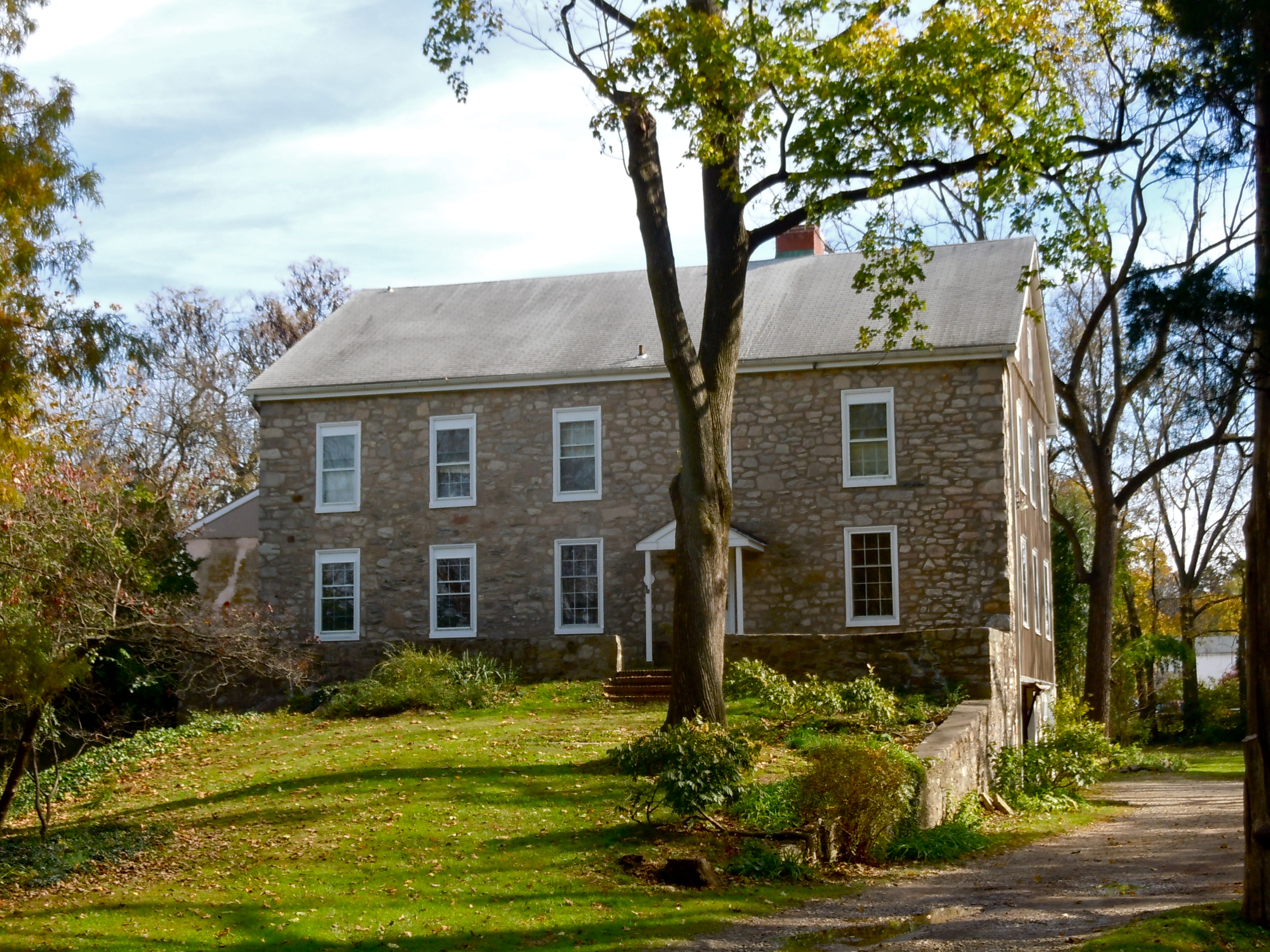
Maulsby Barn (built c.1795)

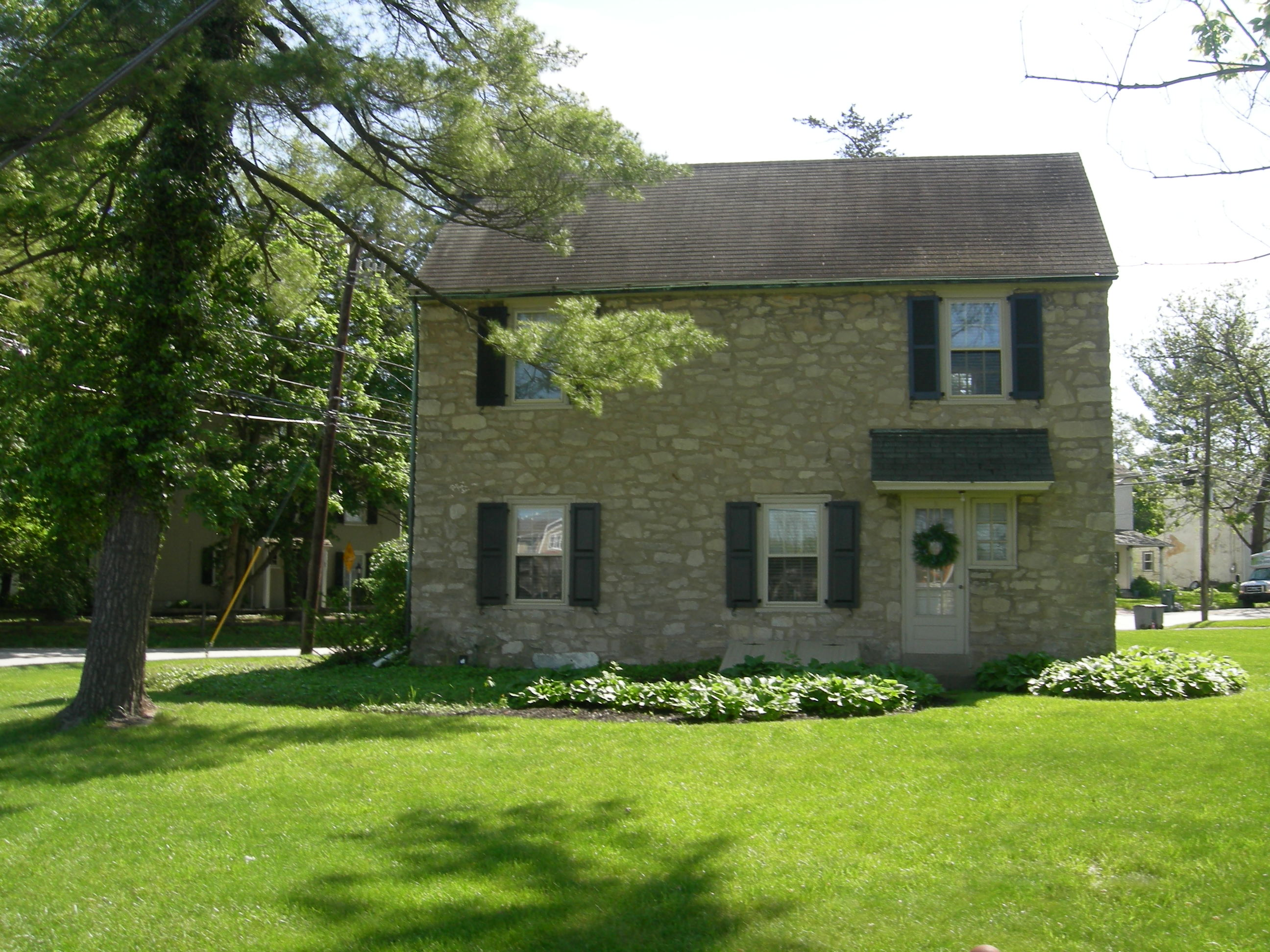
Cater-Corner House (built c.1739), from Butler Pike

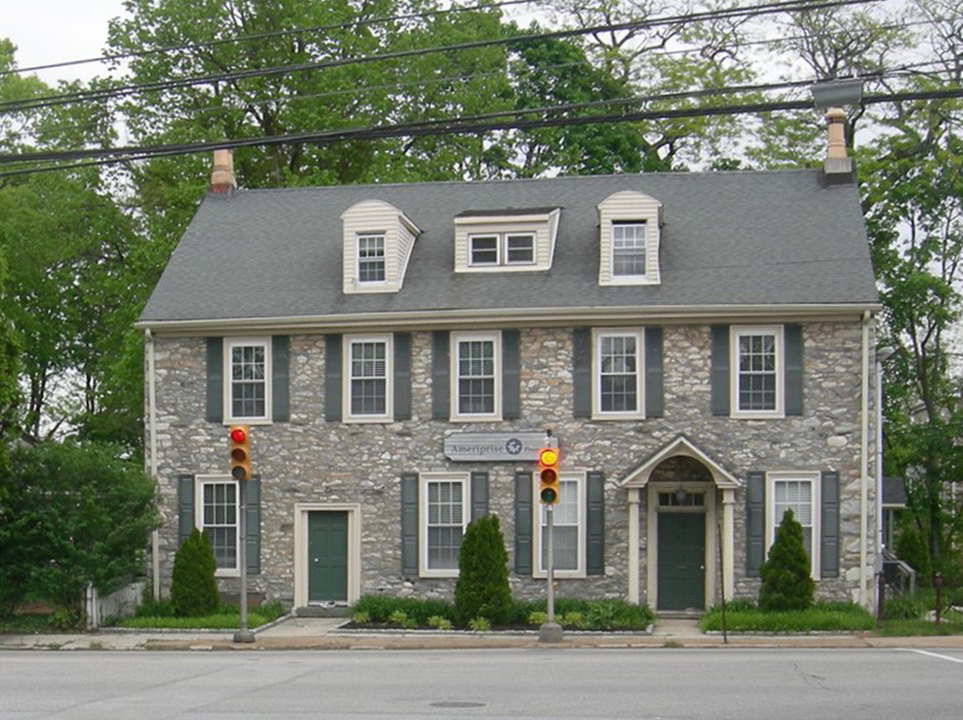
Plymouth Meeting General Store and Post Office (built c.1826–27)

On 3 February 1794, Samuel Maulsby purchased the 8.25-acre plot at the northeast corner of Germantown and Butler Pikes, for £137. (Note: The sellers were John Fontiles and his wife Elizabeth, who had bought the corner plot from Joseph and Mary Potts on February 2, 1789.) The 1794 deed mentioned "a messuage" (house) on the property, but did not describe it. Maulsby later purchased adjacent plots at the north end of the farm, which expanded it to 128 acres (51.8 hectares) and extended it to Flourtown Road.

Samuel Maulsby was the owner of a large and fertile farm at Plymouth Meeting... It included the whole north east corner of the two roads, the Germantown turnpike, its south boundary, and the Plymouth and Broad Axe turnpike, along which it extended for half a mile, its western boundary. [I]n addition to the farming operations the burning of lime (Note: Limestone was burned in kilns to produce lime, which would be mixed with water and sand to create mortar.) was extensively carried on by him.

Sometime around 1795, Samuel Maulsby built a three-story, fourteen-room, Federal-style dwelling on the northeast corner of Germantown and Butler Pikes, diagonally opposite the meetinghouse. He seems to have incorporated an earlier stone building into his new house. (Note: Nancy Corson, author of the 1969 NRHP nomination for these buildings, concluded that Samuel Maulsby's c.1795 house incorporated stone walls from an earlier house. This probably would have been the messuage [house] mentioned in the 1794 deed for the corner plot. NOTE: The earlier house could not have been Merchant Maulsby Jr.'s c.1767 stone house, since the corner plot was never part of his farm.) He built the stone barn, perhaps around the same time, and is presumed to have built the carriage shed. In 1799, he married Susanna Thomas (1780–1818), and they had seven children.

Maulsby altered the Cater-Corner House (c.1802), at the southeast corner of Butler Pike and Flourtown Road, possibly as housing for Thomas Davis, a free-Black limeburner recorded as living on Maulsby's property. At 3-5 Germantown Pike, just east of his house, Maulsby built the Plymouth Meeting General Store and Post Office (c.1826–27). His son Jonathan (1801–1845) managed the store and served as Plymouth Meeting's first postmaster.

In 1832, Maulsby's daughter Martha (1807–1870) married George Corson (1803–1860), a son of Joseph and Hannah Corson, and a former clerk in the general store. Samuel Maulsby died on July 12, 1838, and was interred beside his wife in the meetinghouse's burial ground. George and Martha Maulsby Corson purchased the farm from her father's estate on April 6, 1839. George and his brother Walter purchased the Maulsby limestone quarries, and founded G. & W. H. Corson Company – Lime Merchants in 1843.

=== Abolitionism ===
External videos
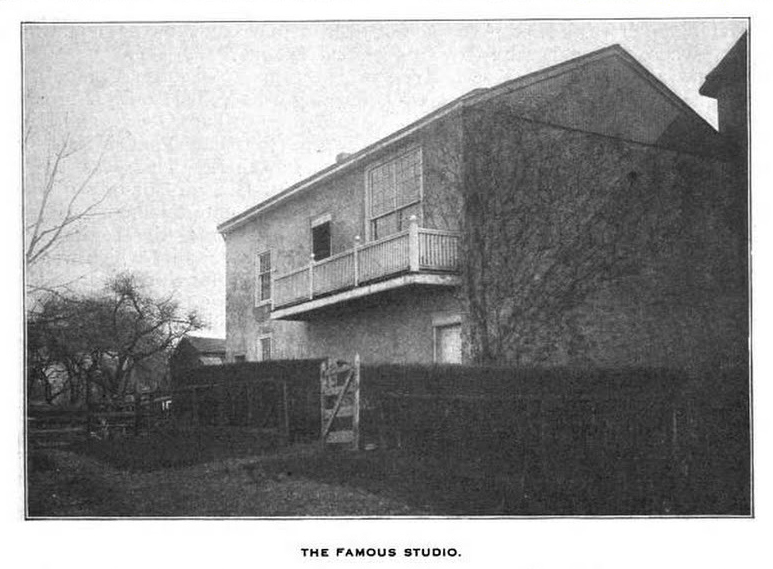
- History at the Crossroads, The Activists and Artists of Abolition Hall, 11:20

The Fugitive Slave Act of 1793 made it a federal crime to give assistance to someone escaping enslavement.

The earliest and only abolitionists in Plymouth and Whitemarsh townships were Samuel Maulsby, Joseph Corson and [his son] Alan W. Corson. Away back before 1820 they had been stirred by the scathing denunciations of slavery, and the horrors of the slave trade, made by Granville Sharp, William Wilberforce and Thomas Fouell Buxton, before the Parliament of Great Britain, to an intense hatred of slavery and the slave trade, and the abominations of slavery in our own country.

Maulsby and the Corsons co-founded the Plymouth Meeting Anti-Slavery Society in 1831, which initially had seven members and met at the Plymouth Friends Meeting House. They also were founders of the Montgomery County Anti-Slavery Society in 1837, which initially had about twenty members and met at various locations in Norristown. Frederick Douglass, a fugitive slave and a prominent abolitionist, was the keynote speaker at an August 1847 anti-slavery convention hosted by the First Baptist Church of Norristown. His lecture was disrupted by roughly sixty pro-slavery activists outside the church pelting its windows with rocks. A plot to abduct and lynch Douglass that night was thwarted.

Both George Corson's and Martha Maulsby's parents had sheltered fugitive slaves. But it was the couple's close friendship with Benjamin Lundy – publisher of the Pennsylvania Anti-Slavery Society's weekly newspaper, The National Enquirer (1836–1838) – that inspired them to fully engage in the cause. They turned their property into a major station on the Underground Railroad, (Note: Robert R. Corson: "While at Uncle George [Corson]'s a slave would knock at the door after dark, be taken in and cared for till next day in the evening, when he would be taken on to Bucks county. At that time our first, great duty was to secure their escape from the slave-hunters, so kept no account of the number of slaves or their history. Sometimes two or three men would come together—at other times women and children, or a man and wife. All were received and well cared for.") providing food and shelter to hundreds of escaping slaves. Daniel Ross, a free Black man in Norristown, Pennsylvania, often acted as "conductor", leading the fugitives by night to the next station — north to the house of William Foulke at Penllyn, Pennsylvania; or northeast to abolitionists living around the Quaker meetinghouses in Upper Dublin and Horsham, Pennsylvania. The Underground Railroad route continued east through Bucks County, then north through New Jersey and New York, and to eventual freedom in Canada. In at least one instance, George Corson hid fugitives under a wagonload of hay and drove them to the next station.

The greater burden of the work [of sheltering runaways] was borne by George and his wife, Martha Maulsby Corson. Their residence in the old Maulsby home, right in front of the Friends' Plymouth Meeting-House, was so prominent a place, known by everybody for miles around, made it easy for slaves to find the place, when sent by those from a distance to "George Corson's at Plymouth Meeting." He it was who forwarded fugitives to Mahlon Linton, at Newtown, or to William H. Johnson, at Buckingham, or to Richard Moore, at Quakertown, Bucks county, time after time, during the whole period of the great struggle from 1830 to 1850.

The Fugitive Slave Act of 1850 increased the penalties for giving assistance to someone escaping enslavement to six months in prison and a $1,000 fine. It allowed slavecatchers to pursue a fugitive across state lines into every U.S. state and territory. George Corson was involved in hiding Jane Johnson, whose escape to freedom exposed a loophole in the federal law.

==== Jane Johnson ====
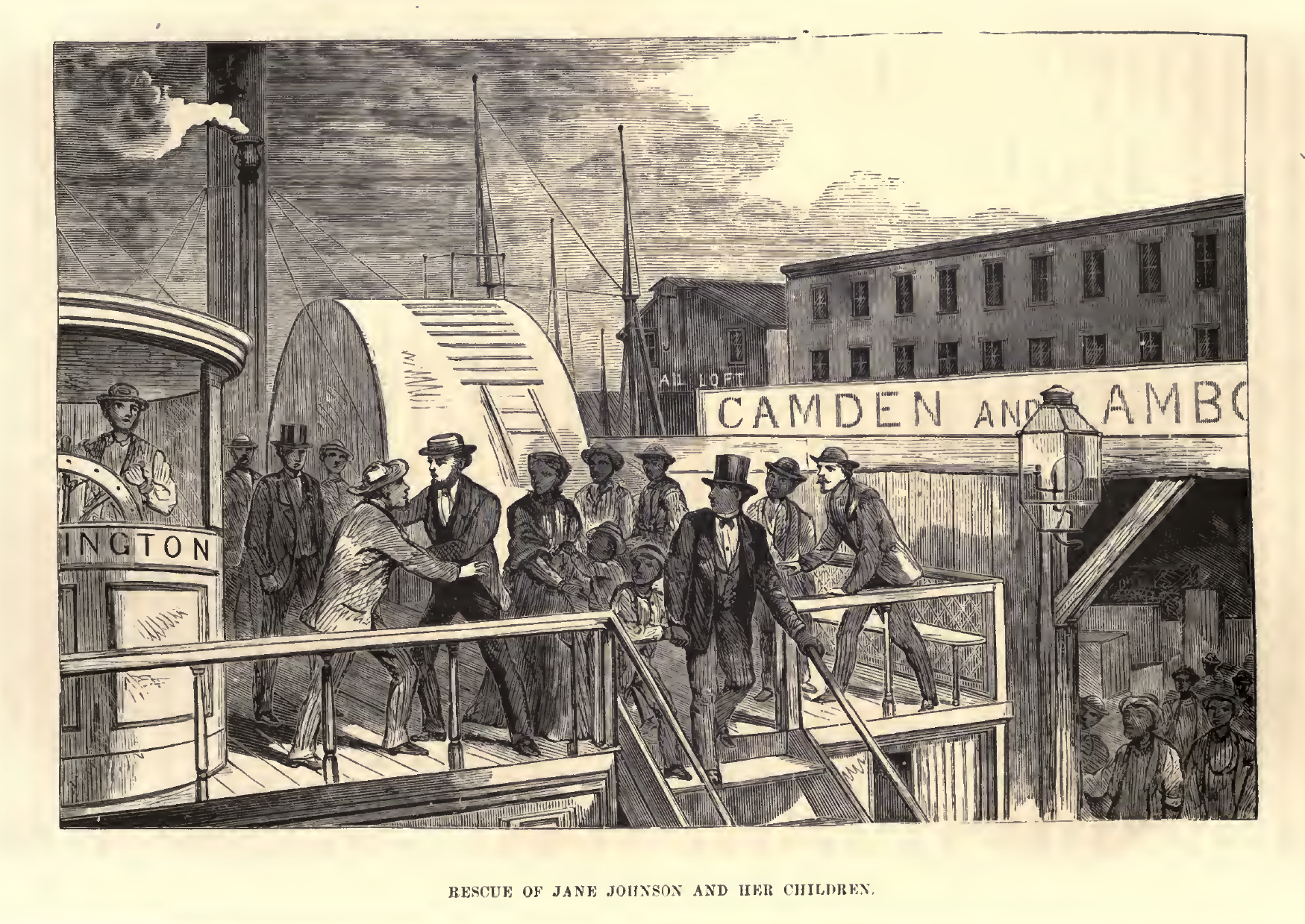
"Rescue of Jane Johnson and her children, July 18, 1855." Illustration from William Still, The Underground Railroad (1872).

On the morning of July 18, 1855, Jane Johnson (c.1822–1872) and her two sons, Daniel (age 5 or 6) and Isaiah (age 11 or 12), arrived in Philadelphia by train with their North Carolina enslaver, John H. Wheeler, and his wife and three children. President Franklin Pierce had appointed Wheeler U.S. Minister to Nicaragua in 1854, and the group was en route from Washington, D.C. to New York City, from which they would board a ship to return to Central America. At Philadelphia, they had to switch to a ferry to cross the Delaware River. Wheeler locked Johnson and her sons in a hotel room while he and his family took the afternoon to visit his wife's relatives. (Note: Mrs. Wheeler was the former Ellen Oldmixon Sully, daughter of painter Thomas Sully.)

Pennsylvania had begun a gradual abolition of slavery in 1780, and passed legislation in 1847 voiding the property rights of any slaveholder within the state. (Note: Pennsylvania's 1780 Gradual Abolition Law had freed only the future children of enslaved people in Pennsylvania. The 1847 law was intended to free those who had been enslaved in the state prior to March 1780 (fewer than 100, according to the 1840 U.S. Census). But the 1847 law was interpreted as also applying to slavecatchers, and to residents of other states traveling with their enslaved through Pennsylvania.) Johnson sought help from a Black hotel porter in escaping to freedom. The porter contacted abolitionist William Still, who had been born enslaved, and Still and lawyer Passmore Williamson rushed to the docks as the 5:00 pm ferry was about to depart for Camden, New Jersey. They found Johnson and her sons with Wheeler on the ferry's upper deck. Williamson approached her and explained that Pennsylvania law guaranteed her freedom, if she chose to take it:

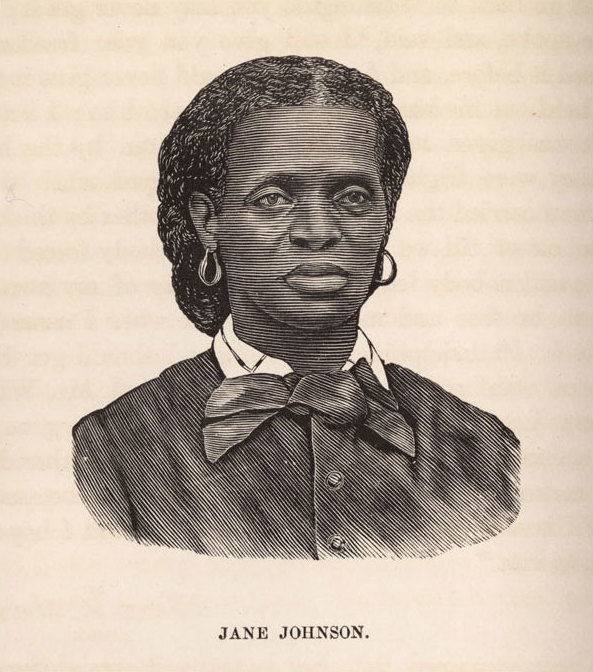

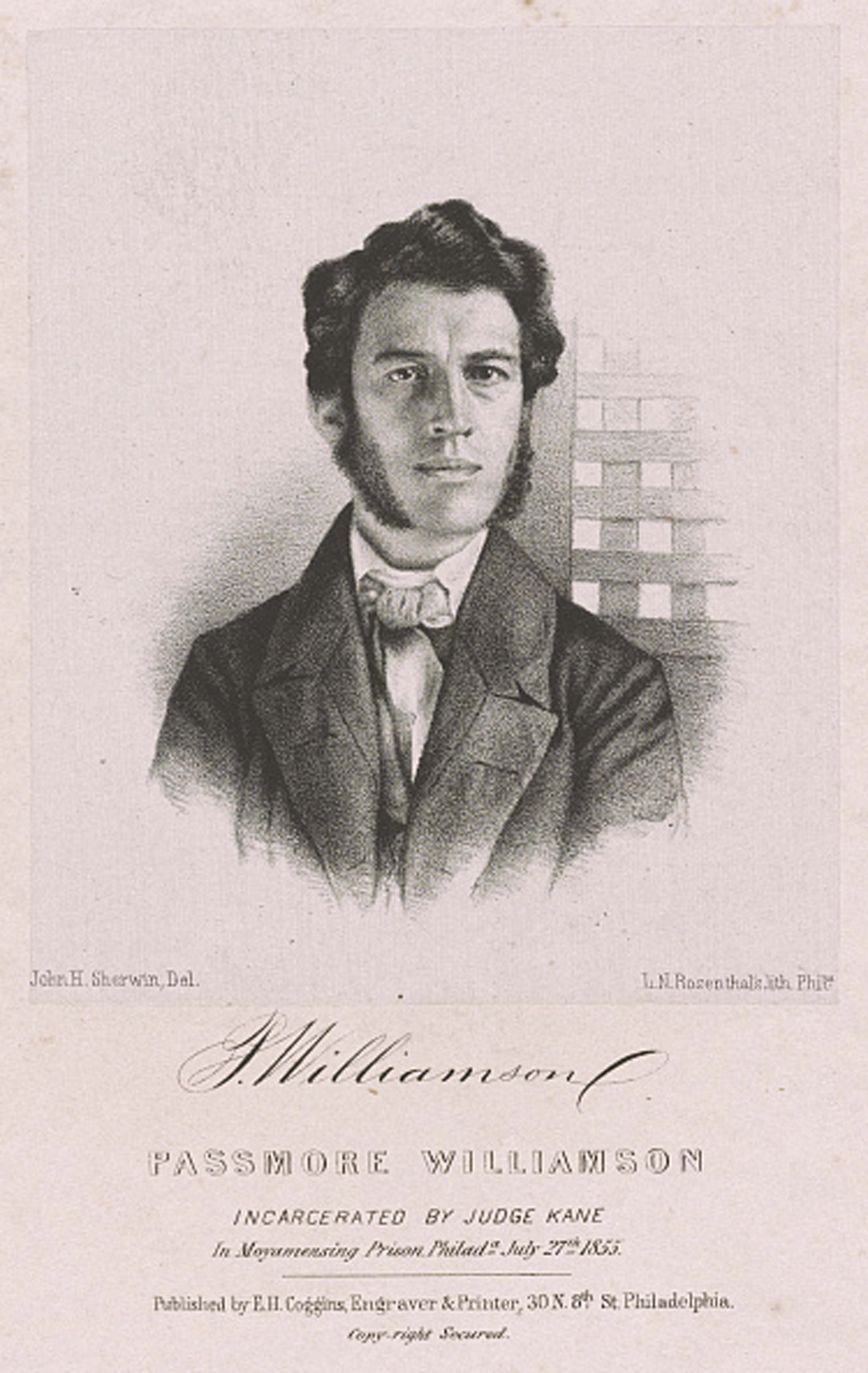

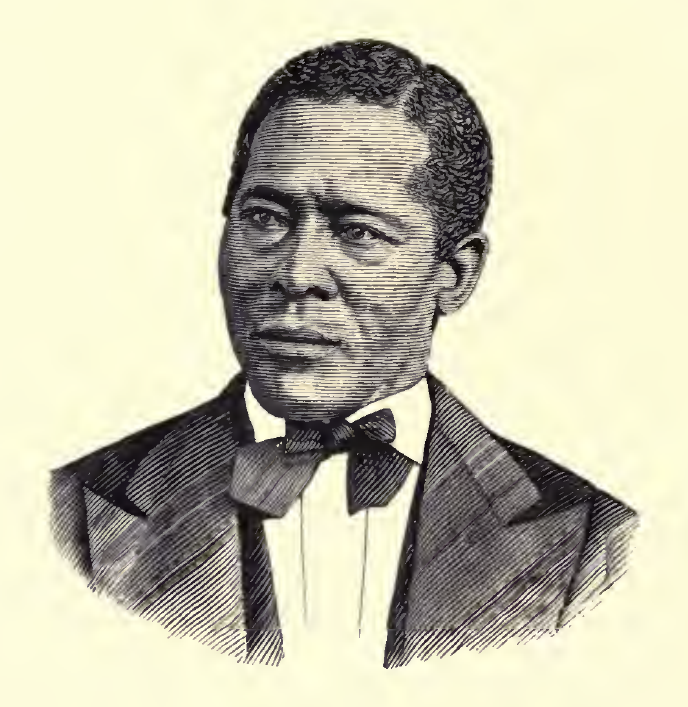
William Still, abolitionist and author of The Underground Railroad (1872)

"You are entitled to your freedom according to the laws of Pennsylvania, having been brought into the State by your owner. If you prefer freedom to slavery, as we suppose everybody does, you have the chance to accept it now. Act calmly—don't be frightened by your master—you are as much entitled to your freedom as we are, or as he is—be determined and you need have no fears but that you will be protected by the law. Judges have time and again decided cases in this city and State similar to yours in favor of freedom! Of course, if you want to remain a slave with your master, we cannot force you to leave; we only want to make you sensible of your rights. Remember, if you lose this chance you may never get such another ..."

During the few moments in which the above remarks were made, the slaveholder frequently interrupted—said she understood all about the laws making her free, and her right to leave if she wanted to; but contended that she did not want to leave— ... [B]ut the woman's desire to be free was altogether too strong to allow her to make a single acknowledgment favorable to his wishes in the matter. On the contrary, she repeatedly said, distinctly and firmly, "I am not free, but I want my freedom—ALWAYS wanted to be free!! but he holds me."

The [ferry's] last bell tolled! The last moment for further delay passed! The arm of the woman being slightly touched, accompanied with the word, "Come!" she instantly arose. Instantly on their starting, the slave-holder rushed at the woman and her children, to prevent their leaving; and, if I am not mistaken, he simultaneously took hold of the woman and Mr. Williamson, which resistance on his part caused Mr. W. to take hold of him and set him aside quickly. The passengers were looking on all around, but none interfered in behalf of the slaveholder except one man, whom I took to be another slaveholder. He said harshly, "Let them alone; they are his property!" The woman and children were assisted, but not forced to leave. Nor were there any violence or threatenings as I saw or heard.

As Still led Johnson and her sons away, five Black dockhands prevented Wheeler from stopping them. (Note: The dockhands were John Ballard, James P. Braddock, William Curtis, James Martin and Isaac Moore.) Williamson remained behind to explain to authorities that this had been a lawful act, not a kidnapping.

Williamson, the only white man involved, was arrested and charged with violating the Fugitive Slave Act. (Note: Judge John Kintzing Kane: "Of all the parties to the act of violence, he [Williamson] was the only white man, the only citizen, the only individual having recognized political rights, the only person whose social training could certainly interpret either his own duties or the rights of others, under the constitution of the land.") Federal Judge John Kintzing Kane presided over his trial, and refused to believe that Williamson did not know where Johnson was being hidden. Kane found Williamson in contempt of court, and jailed him for more than three months, which attracted national attention. Williamson's successful defense was that Wheeler had voluntarily brought Johnson into Pennsylvania, a free state, therefore she was not a fugitive across state lines, and Pennsylvania law rather than federal law applied.

Still and the five dockhands were charged with forcible abduction, rioting, disorderly conduct, and assault. On August 29, 1855, Johnson appeared as a surprise witness at their trial, and testified that it had been her own decision to walk away from Wheeler, freeing herself and her sons. The most serious charges against the Black men were dismissed, although the two who had restrained Wheeler were convicted of assault and spent a week in jail.

Johnson was escorted out of the courthouse by abolitionists Lucretia Mott, Rev. James Miller McKim and George Corson. She was hidden at Corson's house in Plymouth Meeting to prevent pro-slavery activists from abducting her and returning her to slavery. (Note: "The following night, in a close carriage, she [Johnson] was brought to the house of George Corson, at Plymouth Meeting, where for a few days in privacy, she received the kind ministrations of Martha Maulsby Corson, wife of George, and one of the earliest and most devoted of the abolitionists of the region.") At the end of her stay, Corson's thirteen-year-old son, Ellwood, drove Johnson in a carriage by night to Mahlon Linton's house in Newtown, Bucks County, Pennsylvania. From there she was smuggled back to Boston, Massachusetts, and reunited with her sons.

==== Abolition Hall ====
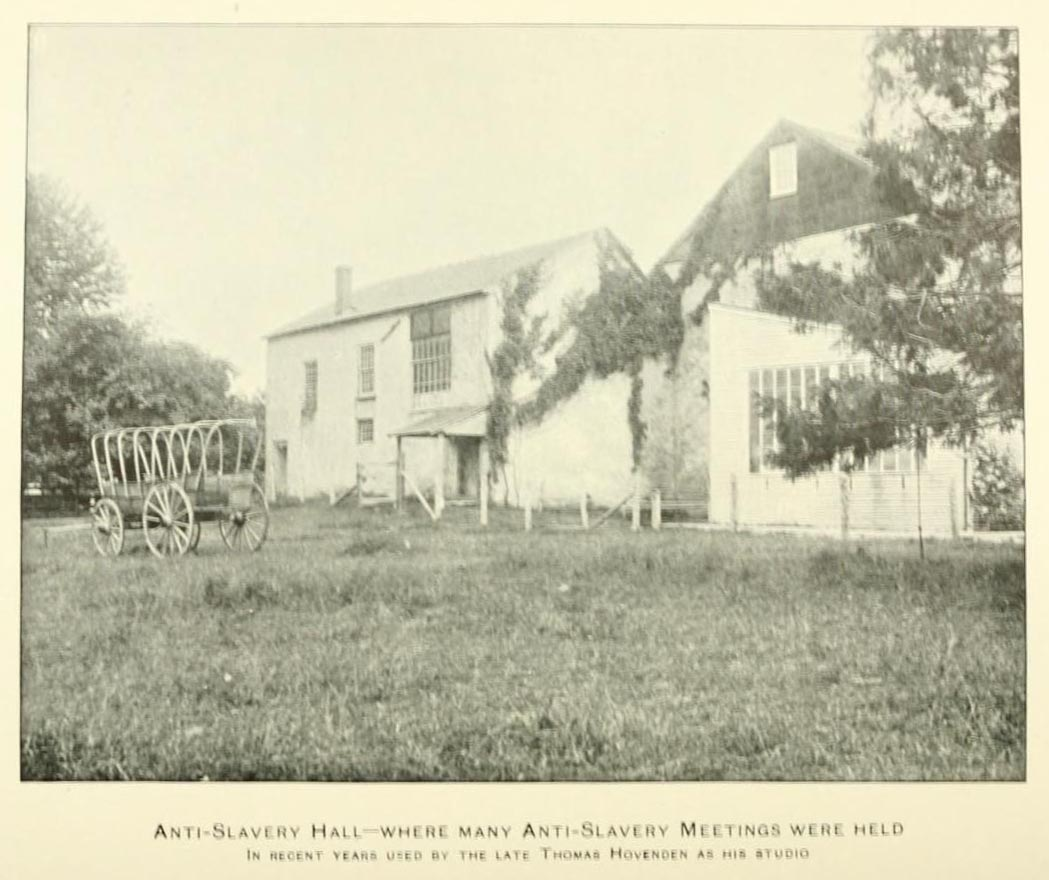
Abolition Hall (built 1856), left, and Maulsby Barn (built c.1795), right, about 1906

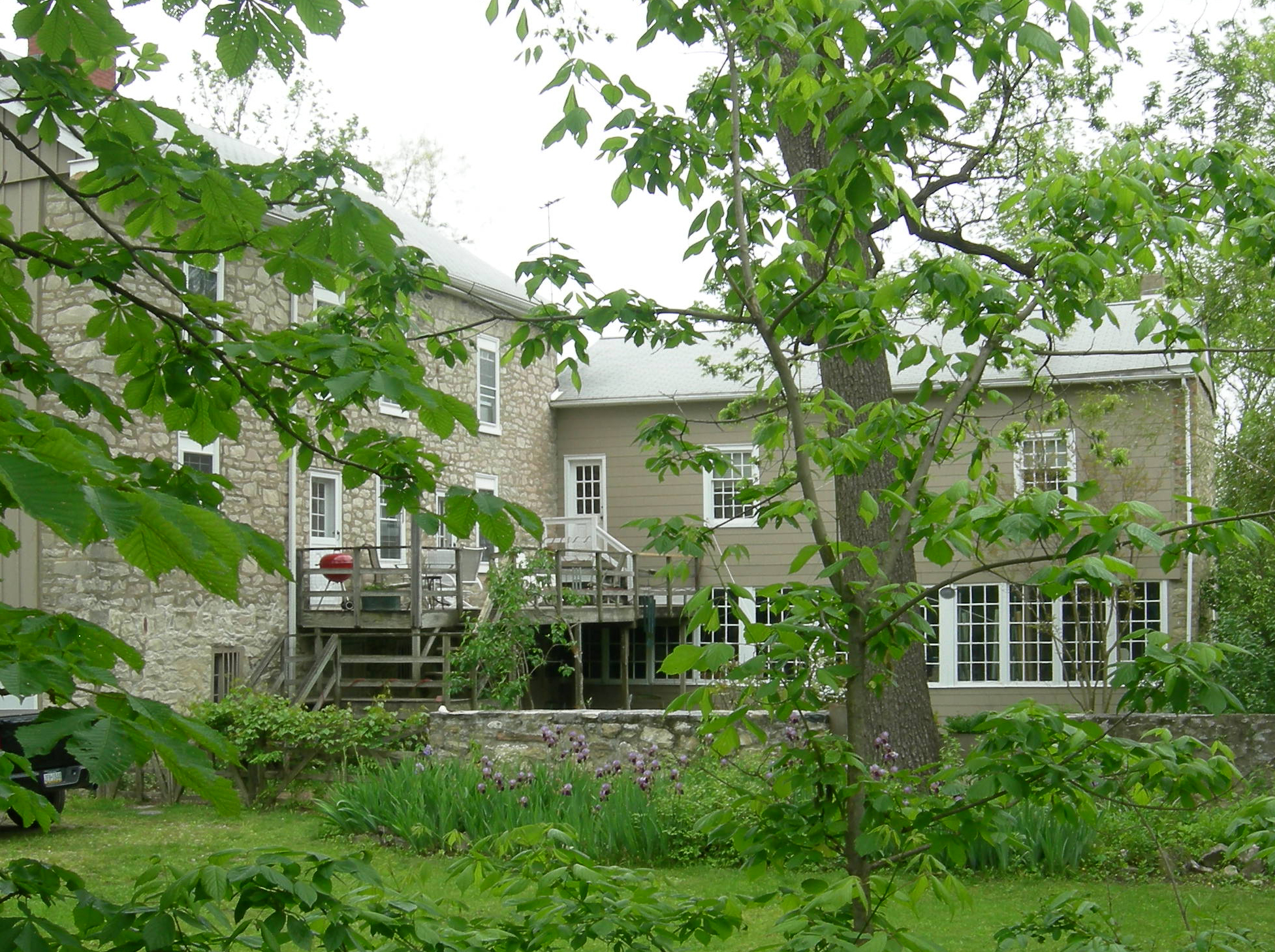
Rear wall of Maulsby Barn, left, and Abolition Hall, right, in 2016

The Jane Johnson affair caused a national controversy—largely cheered in the North, viciously condemned in the South. For more than two decades, the Plymouth Friends Meeting had permitted the anti-slavery society to use its meeting house, but, following the suspicious burning of a local church that had hosted abolitionist speakers, permission was denied for the first time in 1856. George Corson's reaction to this denial was to build a lecture hall over his carriage house for abolitionist meetings.

He determined to build a hall, over which he could have control. He made quite a large one and furnished it well with seats, warmed and lighted at his own expense. And now we can see how convenient it was for the lecturers to make his house their temporary home. As time wore on more and more neighbors and friends were attracted to the meetings to hear the eloquent and earnest men and women who pictured the atrocities of slavery.

Abolition Hall could hold up to 200 people, and provided a meeting place for the Plymouth Meeting Anti-Slavery Society and for lectures by prominent abolitionists, including Frederick Douglass, Harriet Beecher Stowe, William Lloyd Garrison and Lucretia Mott.

George Corson died in November 1860, more than two years before President Abraham Lincoln signed the January 1, 1863 Emancipation Proclamation. William Still eulogized Corson in his 1872 history of the Underground Railroad:

There were perhaps few more devoted men than George Corson to the interests of the oppressed everywhere. The slave, fleeing from his master, ever found a home with him, and felt while there that no slave-hunter would get him away until every means of protection should fail. He was ever ready to send his horse and carriage to convey them on the road to Canada, or elsewhere toward freedom. His home was always open to entertain the anti-slavery advocates, and being warmly supported in the cause by his excellent wife, everything which they could do to make their guests comfortable was done. It is to be regretted that he died before the emancipation of the slaves, which he had so long labored for, arrived.

=== Artist's studio ===
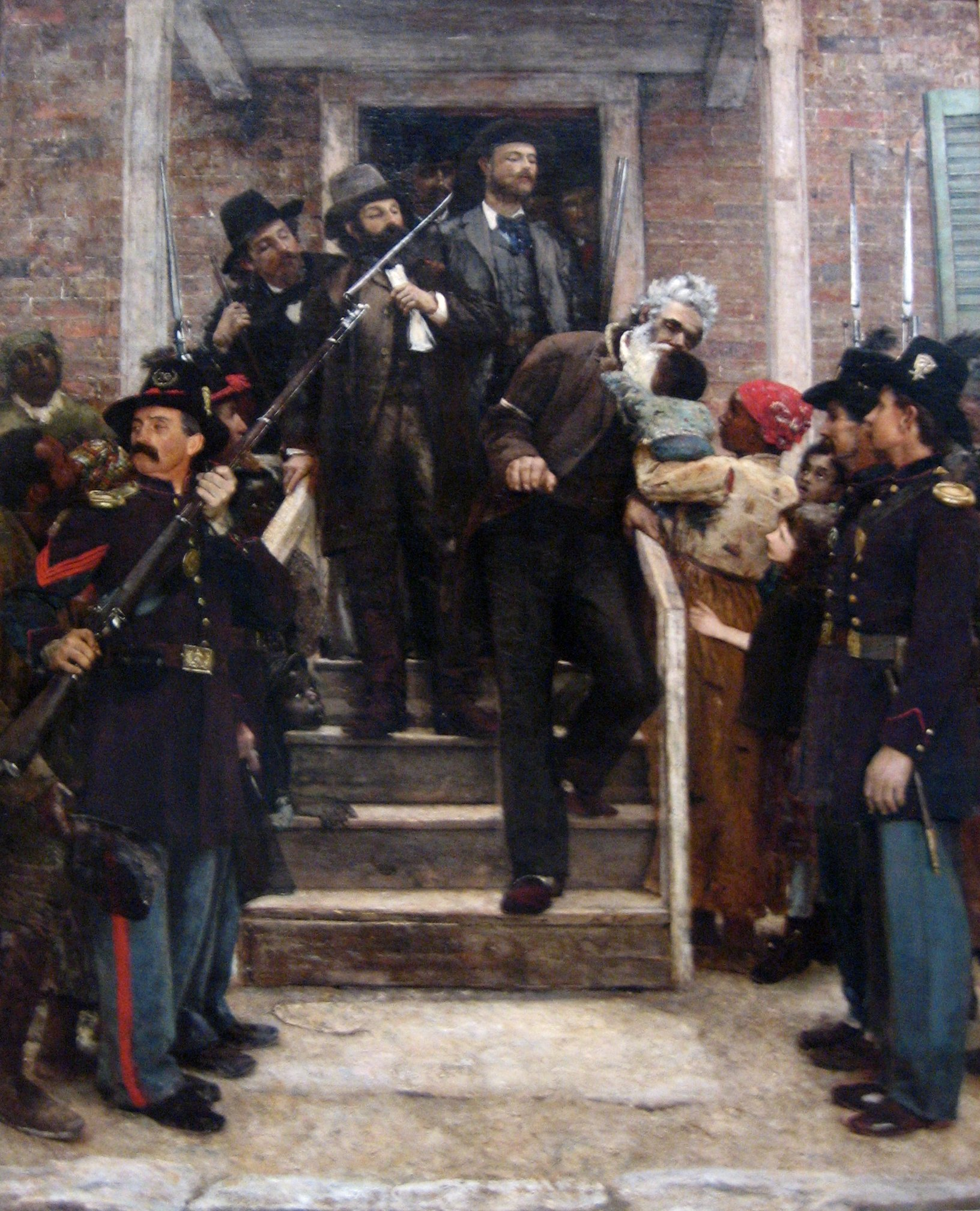
The Last Moments of John Brown (1882–1884) by Thomas Hovenden, Metropolitan Museum of Art

George & Martha Maulsby Corson's daughter, Helen (1846–1935), attended the Plymouth Friends School, and trained as an artist at the Philadelphia School of Design for Women. She subsequently studied in Paris, and exhibited at the Paris Salon in 1876, 1879 and 1880. She met Irish-born painter Thomas Hovenden (1840–1895) in France, and they were married at the Plymouth Friends Meeting House on June 9, 1881. The couple moved into her late parents' house, and raised two children, Thomas Jr. and Martha. Helen Corson Hovenden became noted for her portraits of children and pets.

Thomas Hovenden succeeded Thomas Eakins as professor of painting at the Pennsylvania Academy of the Fine Arts in 1886. He specialized in genre scenes of rural life, using his neighbors, sometimes African Americans, as models. He converted Abolition Hall into his studio, and the moral causes that had been championed there inspired some of his works. One of his most famous paintings – The Last Moments of John Brown (1882–1884), Metropolitan Museum of Art – depicts the radical abolitionist John Brown kissing a baby as he is led to the gallows. Hovenden was elected an associate member of the National Academy of Design in 1881, and an academician in 1882.

"Thomas Hovenden lost his life on an unguarded grade crossing of the Pennsylvania Railroad near his home, August 14, 1895, in an attempt to save the life of a little girl who was crossing in front of an approaching engine. Both were killed." The accident occurred about three miles from his house, near the south end of what is now Spring Mill Road. Rev. William Henry Furness gave the eulogy at Hovenden's funeral, and his pall bearers were Eakins, sculptor Samuel Murray, and four male Corson relatives. The advocacy of his widow, Helen Corson Hovenden, and a public letter-writing campaign by Quaker women pressured the Pennsylvania Railroad into elevating the tracks of its high-speed Trenton Cutoff, separating them from the grade level tracks of streetcars.

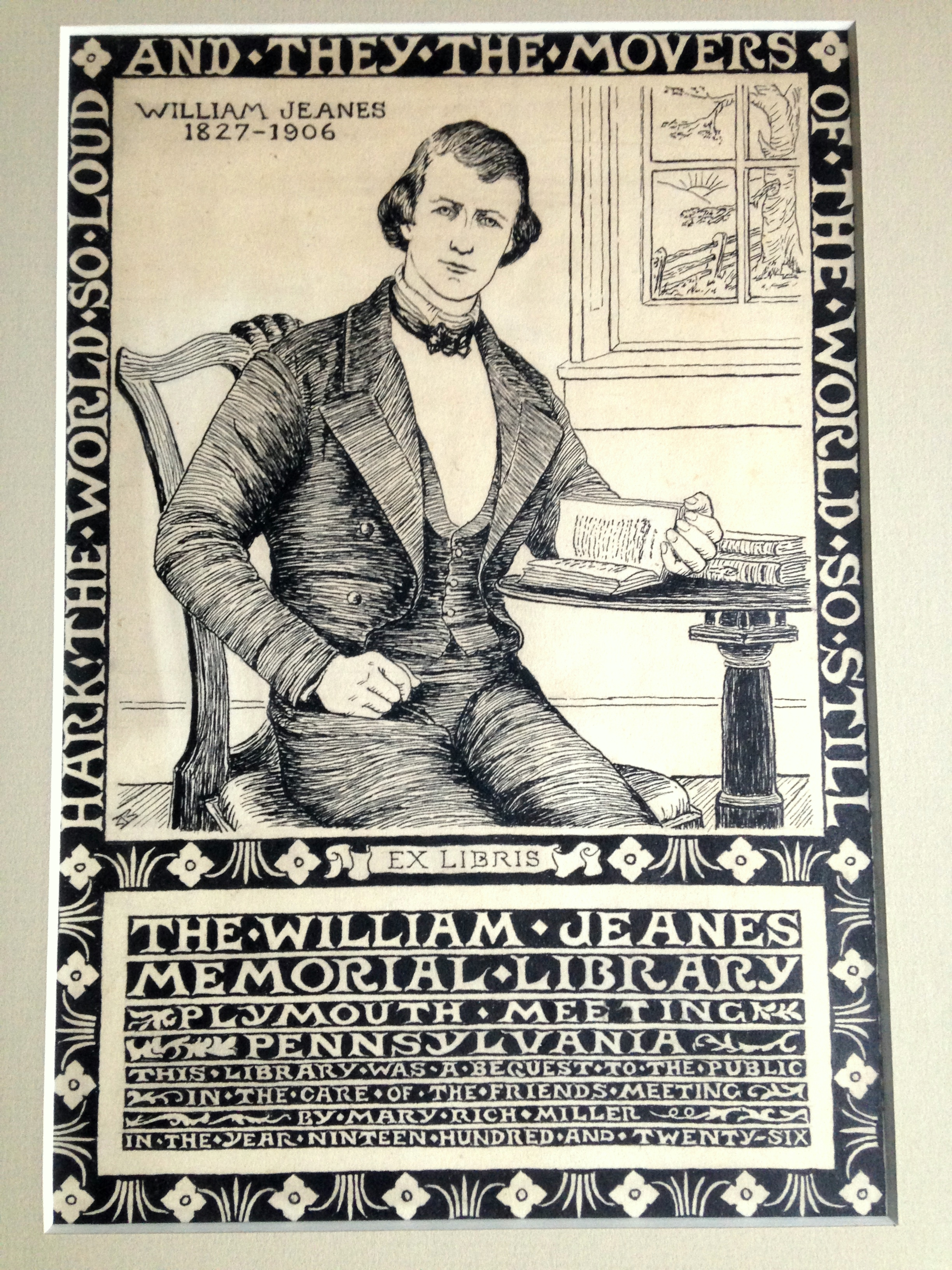
Bookplate for the William Jeanes Memorial Library (1939) by Martha M. Hovenden

The couple's daughter, Martha Maulsby Hovenden (1884–1941), was a sculptor who trained at PAFA under Charles Grafly, and at the Art Students League of New York under Hermon Atkins MacNeil. She later used the first floor of Abolition Hall as her studio. Her large limestone bas relief tablets, The Declaration of Independence (1926) and The United States Constitution (1936), were commissioned for the Washington Memorial Chapel in Valley Forge.

Nancy Corson (1920–2012)—a great-granddaughter of George Corson and a granddaughter of Dr. Ellwood M. Corson (the teenager who had assisted in Jane Johnson's 1855 return to Boston)—altered the Maulsby stone barn into a residence. She lived there from 1946 until her death in 2012. Nancy Corson was an artist, and also worked as a draftsperson for an engineering firm. In 1969, she was the author of the National Register of Historic Places nomination for Hovenden House, Barn and Abolition Hall.

== Plymouth Meeting Historic District ==
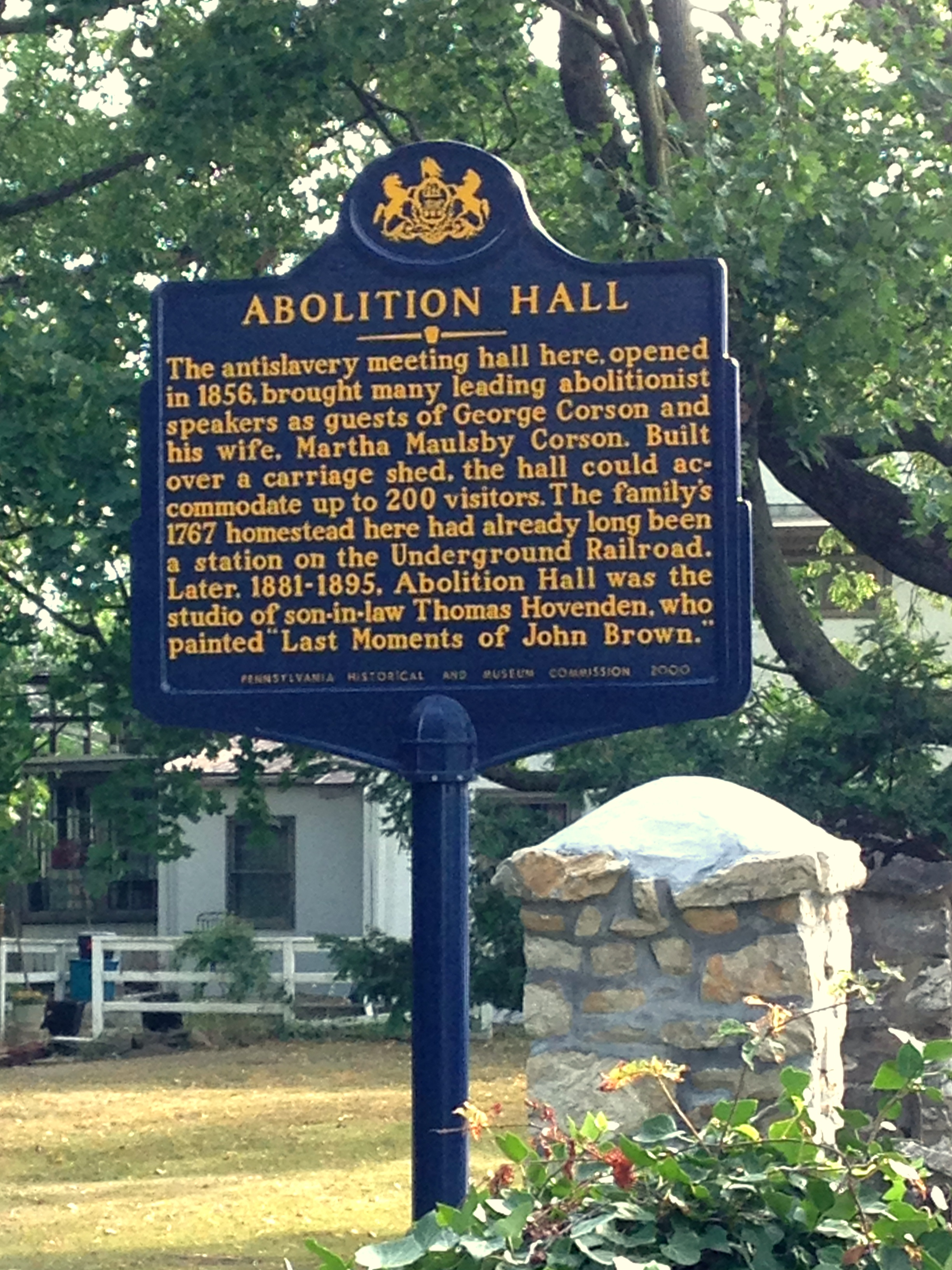

The village of Plymouth Meeting was designated a Pennsylvania historic district in 1961, by a joint resolution of Plymouth and Whitemarsh Townships. The district encompassed 66 historic structures.

In 1971, the village of Plymouth Meeting became Pennsylvania's first National Register District. At the time, the Maulsby/Corson/Hovenden homestead was threatened by a plan to split Butler Pike into two one-way highways that would straddle the buildings on the property. The northbound bypass would have run alongside the east wall of the barn, and required the demolition of Abolition Hall. Nancy Corson authored a separate NRHP nomination specifically for the Hovenden House, Barn and Abolition Hall as a unit, which was also approved in 1971. Plans for the bypass were abandoned.

=== Historical marker ===
Nancy Corson and Charles L. Blockson, an authority on the history of the Underground Railroad, co-wrote the nomination for a Pennsylvania state historical marker to commemorate Abolition Hall. The marker was approved, and dedicated at 4006 Butler Pike (in front of the barn) on November 18, 2000:

== Recent history ==
An offer by Whitemarsh Township to purchase the eight acres of fields for open space was declined by its owners in 2014. The Township's 2014 offer did not include acquisition of the historic buildings.

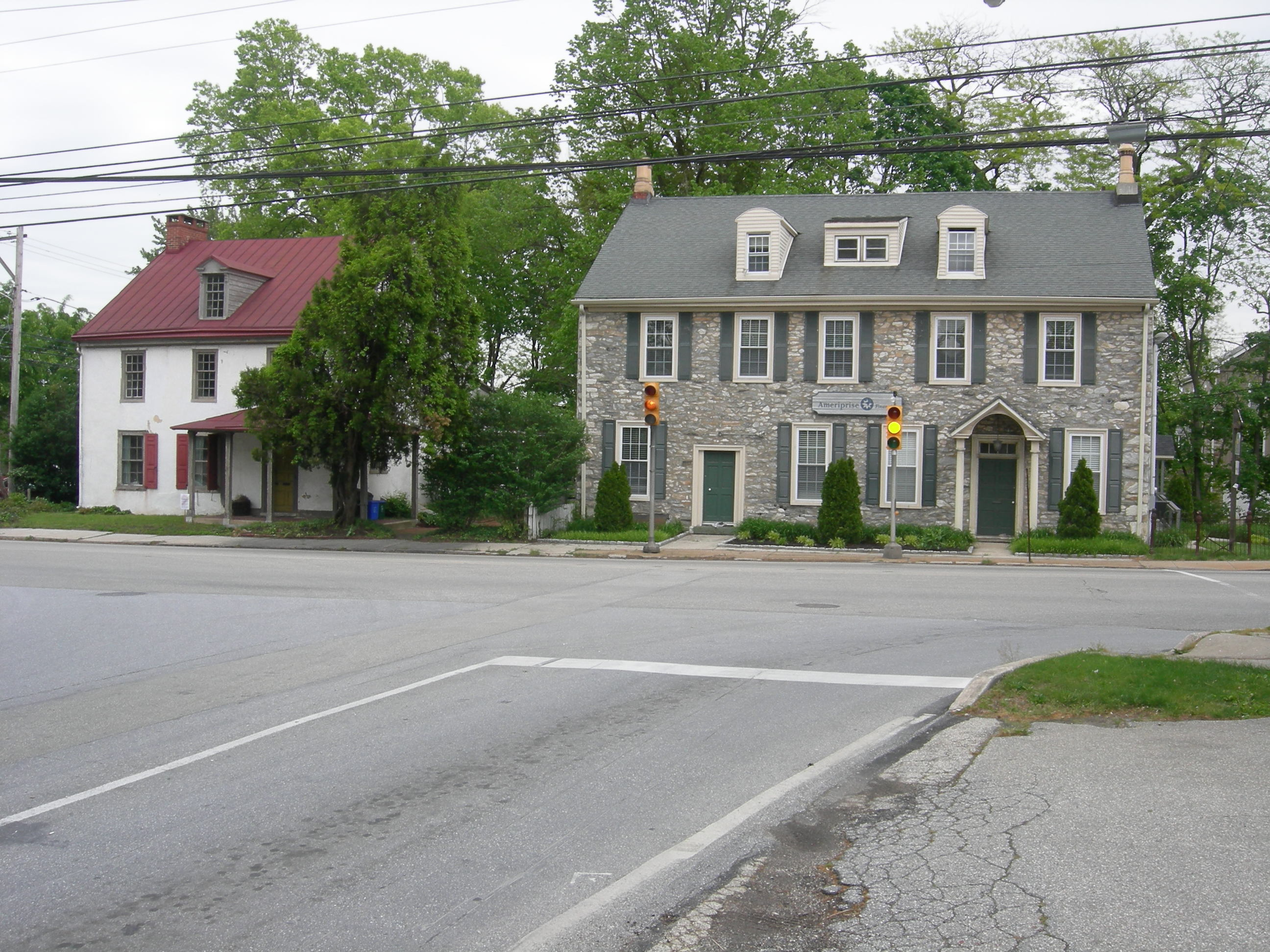
Hovenden House (left) and Plymouth Meeting General Store and Post Office, from South Butler Pike

=== Proposed development ===
In late 2015, K. Hovnanian Builders submitted a sketch plan to the township's planning/zoning office that proposed the construction of 48 townhouses on the eight acres of open space behind the historic buildings. The plan proposed the re-routing of Butler Pike between Hovenden House and its Barn/Abolition Hall. This re-routing would have required the demolition or relocation of the Plymouth Meeting General Store and Post Office (also listed on the National Register).

Following vocal opposition, the Whitemarsh Township Board of Supervisors voted unanimously to deny the request for a zoning variance. In response, the developer requested a continuance of a scheduled April 25, 2016 zoning hearing. In late August 2016, K. Hovnanian Builders submitted a revised Zoning Plan to Whitemarsh Township, asserting that the revised plan met the requirements for shared parking and emergency access (via a right-of-way through an adjacent property). In early November 2016, the Zoning Officer issued his Preliminary Opinion, concurring with the developer's assertion that the current Zoning Plan met the requirements of the code. With the second publication of this opinion, a 30-day period began during which any "aggrieved" party could file an appeal. Absent such an appeal, the Zoning Officer's opinion would become binding. (See Section 916.2--Preliminary Opinion of the Zoning Officer). On December 21, 2016, seven concerned Whitemarsh Township residents, represented by counsel, filed an appeal, challenging the Zoning Officer's Preliminary Opinion. On January 31, that appeal was heard before the Whitemarsh Township Zoning Hearing Board, and after three hours of testimony and questions, the hearing was continued to March 16, 2017. On February 15, the attorney for the appellants submitted a legal brief, further supporting the challenge to the Preliminary Opinion.

=== Preservation Advocacy ===
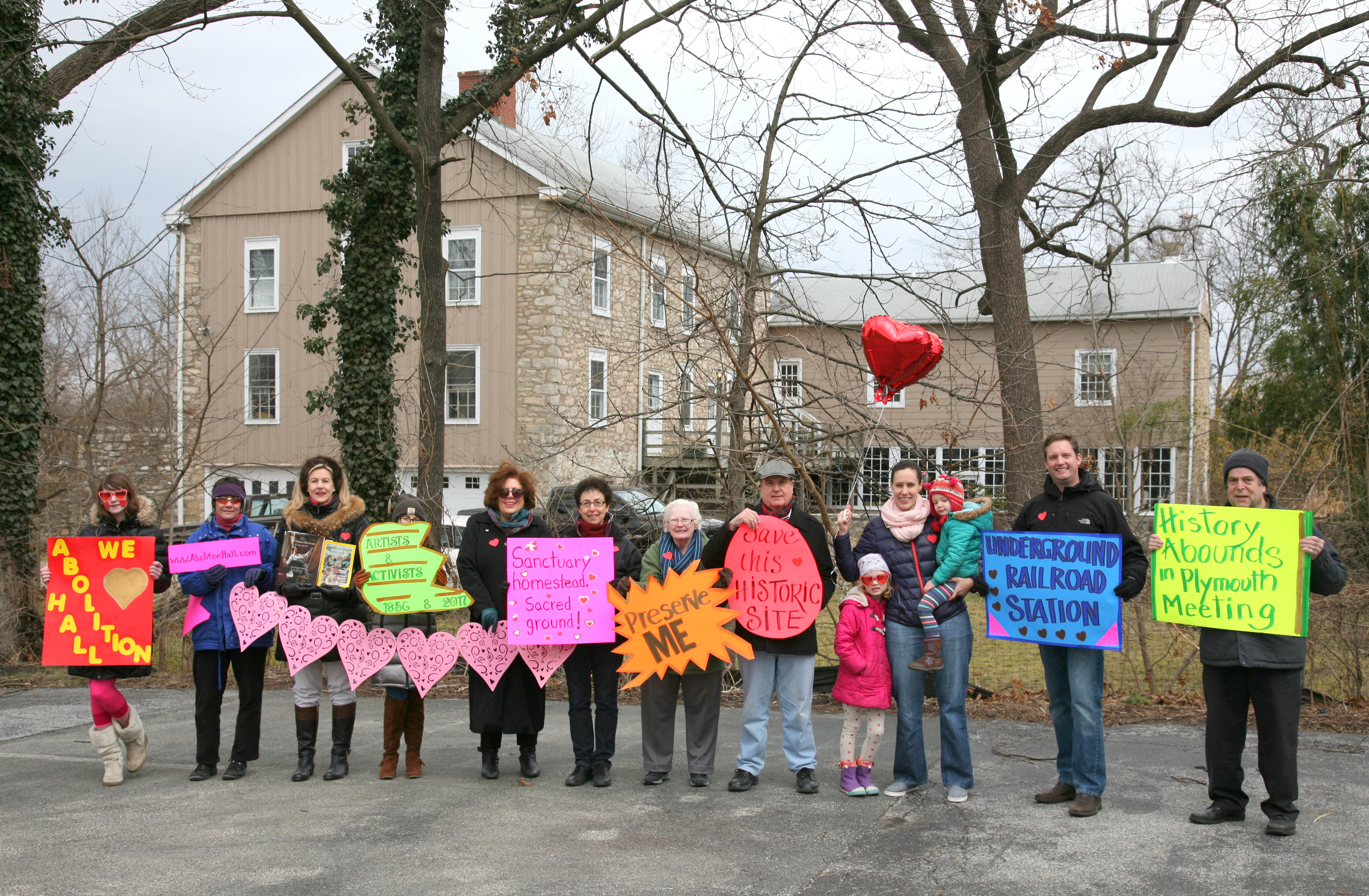
Friends of Abolition Hall Rally, January 29, 2017. The Maulsby Barn is left and Abolition Hall is right.

In Spring 2016, the Preservation Alliance for Greater Philadelphia placed Hovenden House, the Maulsby Barn, and Abolition Hall on its list of "Places to Save", a public registry that "focuses attention and energy towards special places at risk of being lost."

In September 2016, the Pennsylvania Historical and Museum Commission issued a letter to Plymouth and Whitemarsh Townships clarifying and reiterating the significance of the Maulsby/Corson/Hovenden homestead. Noting the "inter-related complex of buildings", the letter went on to state that their 1971 nomination to the National Register of Historic Places "reinforces the important role that these buildings played within the context of the village, as well as their individual historical and architectural significance."

In February 2017, Preservation Pennsylvania (PPA) added the property to its 2017 Pennsylvania At Risk List. The organization also agreed to serve as the fiscal agent for Friends of Abolition Hall and raise funds to support the zoning challenge and protect the legacy of the homestead.

The grassroots battle to save the legacy of the Corson homestead continued as the Friends of Abolition Hall challenged the developer's application for conditional use approval. The application was under consideration by the Whitemarsh Township Board of Supervisors, with a Public Hearing that opened on March 22, 2018. Thereafter, the hearing was continued on six more occasions, with closing arguments scheduled for September 13, 2018. The Friends of Abolition Hall organization was granted standing in the matter, as were a small number of nearby neighbors. Objections to the proposed townhouse plan were based on the assertion that it failed to meet the requirements of the Zoning Code, which was a prerequisite to conditional use approval.

In July 2020, the developer withdrew its subdivision and development plan for the property (along with an adjacent parcel, consisting of just over two acres). The Corson heirs thereafter entered into an agreement of sale with a private investor, but he subsequently withdrew his offer. In November 2022, after months of negotiations, Whitemarsh Township and the Whitemarsh Art Center jointly purchased the historic Corson Homestead (10.45 acres, including buildings).

The purchase was made possible by a combination of private and public funds--$1.95 million in Whitemarsh Township Open Space funds and a $2 million gift from the Karabots Family Foundation. Both the Township and the art center promised to engage the public in planning for the preservation and reuse of the property. As of June 2023, no such efforts had been announced. The land is accessible to the public, however the buildings remain closed. Whitemarsh Art Center plans to relocate from another township-owned building into Hovenden House; the future use of the Stone Barn and Abolition Hall remain unresolved.

== Media coverage ==
=== Television ===
- "Battle over Montco's ties to the Underground Railroad", NBC10, Philadelphia, May 7, 2016. The current owner of the Plymouth Meeting Country Store and Post Office took the news crew into the building's cellar and showed them the tunnels that he says were used as part of the Underground Railroad.

=== Newspapers ===
- "Plymouth Meeting Quakers hid slaves – It's a shrine of the Underground Railroad", The Philadelphia Inquirer, June 19, 1995.
- "Historical marker for a carriage shed called Abolition Hall", The Philadelphia Inquirer, December 10, 2000.
- "An underground story no more", The Philadelphia Inquirer, December 14, 2012.
- "Coexistence sought for Underground Railroad site and townhouses", The Philadelphia Inquirer, May 9, 2016.
- "Local advocacy group continues years long effort to preserve Abolition Hall", The Times Herald (Norristown, Pennsylvania), April 16, 2018.
- "Don't let developers degrade this historic Underground Railroad stop", The Philadelphia Inquirer, April 26, 2018. Op-Ed column by Sydelle Zove drawing attention to the fate of this precious Underground Railroad site.
- "Abolition Hall advocacy group seeks donations", The Chestnut Hill Local, September 7, 2018.
- "Pennsylvania’s antislavery history is under threat from suburban development", The Philadelphia Inquirer, October 26, 2018. Column by Inga Saffron, the Pulitzer-Prize-winning design critic for The Philadelphia Inquirer.

=== Online ===
- "The Liberation of Jane Johnson", The Library Company of Philadelphia, 2003.
- "The intersection at Butler Pike and Germantown Pike could change as well as the entire landscape", Conshystuff, April 8, 2016.
- "Historic estate and Underground Railroad station under threat in Plymouth Meeting", Hidden City Philadelphia, April 20, 2016.
- "Places to Save", Preservation Alliance of Greater Philadelphia, Fall 2016.
- "2017 Pennsylvania At Risk Announced", Preservation Pennsylvania, February 2017 (PDF).
- "Hope and Despair Surround Philly's African-American Landmarks", Hidden City Philadelphia, February 28, 2020.

== See also ==
- Alan West Corson Homestead
- National Register of Historic Places listings in Montgomery County, Pennsylvania
