= Plymouth Friends Meetinghouse =

Historic church and burial ground in Pennsylvania

- U.S. National Register of Historic Places
- Pennsylvania Historical Marker
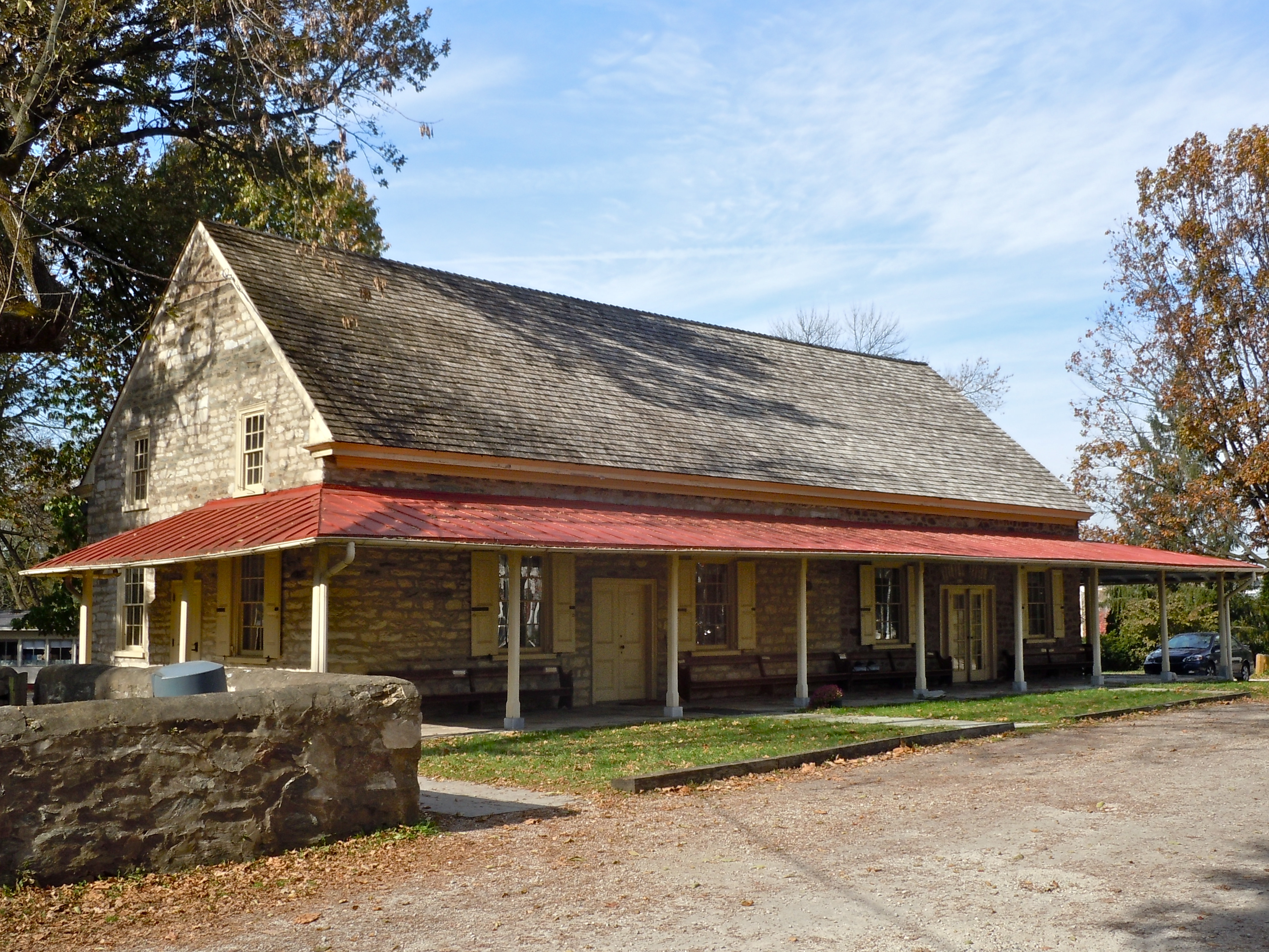
- Plymouth Friends Meeting House

- Location within Philadelphia Location within Pennsylvania Location within the United States
- Location: SE corner of Germantown Pike and Butler Pike, Plymouth Meeting, Pennsylvania
- Coordinates: 40°6′8″N 75°16′48″W
- Area: 5 acres (2.0 ha)
- Built: 1708
- Architectural style: Colonial
- NRHP reference No.: 71000714

Significant dates
- Added to NRHP: February 18, 1971
- Designated PHMC: May 15, 1955

Plymouth Friends Meetinghouse is a historic Quaker meeting house located at the corner of Germantown Pike and Butler Pike in Plymouth Meeting, Pennsylvania, United States. It is part of the Plymouth Meeting Historic District, and was added to the National Register of Historic Places in 1971.

It was built in 1708, and is constructed of native limestone. A wing was added in 1780, and the interior was rebuilt in 1867 following a fire. The porch was also added in 1867, and a rear wing added in 1945.

During the American Revolutionary War, the building served as a temporary military hospital. Troops under the Marquis de Lafayette camped on the grounds prior to the May 20, 1778 Battle of Barren Hill. The meeting house was a hub of activity during the Underground Railroad. Lucretia Mott lectured across the street at Abolition Hall, and is known to have attended the meeting.

Painter and teacher Thomas Hovenden (1840–1895) was a member of the meeting, and is buried with his wife, painter Helen Corson Hovenden, in the adjacent cemetery.

Plymouth Meeting Friends School is under the care of the meeting and is located on site.

Several scenes in the historical novel The Quakeress (1905) by Max Adler take place in the meetinghouse.

== Description from 1912 ==
The Plymouth Meeting House is a solid stone building, 60 feet in length, surrounded by a fine grove of sycamore and other trees. Beyond this is a sloping declivity, on which is an extensive burying ground, covered with little mounds, which has been used for nearly two centuries and an half. It is divided into two parts, the smaller one of which belongs to the orthodox branch of Friends. The southern half of the venerable building is the most ancient. The exact time of its erection has never been known, but it was somewhere between 1709 and 1713. The newer part of the building was added in 1817, and was used as a school-house. In more recent times it was made uniform in height with the older portion. In 1858 the building was seriously injured by fire, which necessitated a new roof and other rebuilding. Like many other church buildings in revolutionary times the building was used for both camp and hospital, first by the American army after the battle of Germantown and then after the retreat of Washington to Valley Forge, by the British forces.

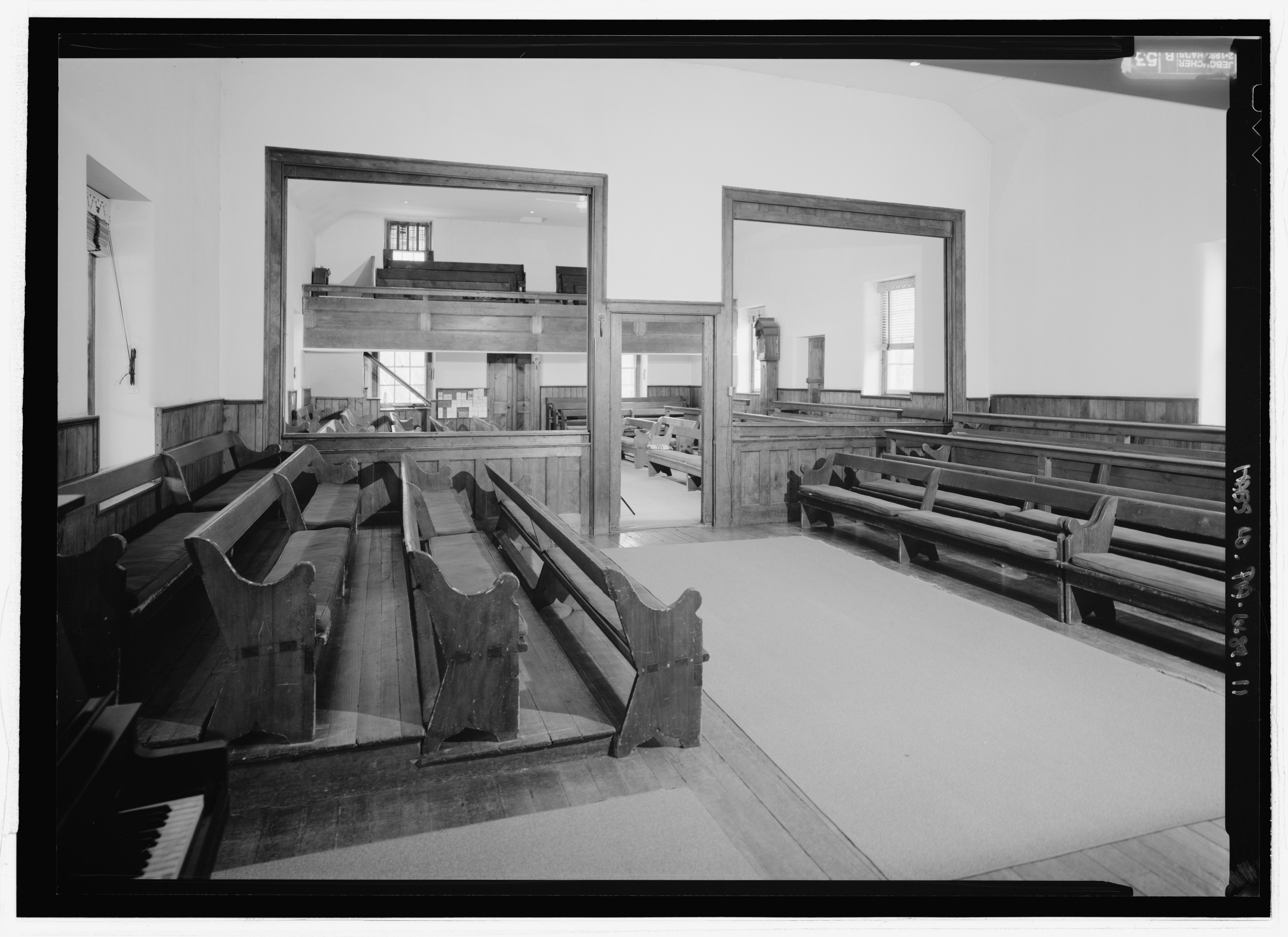
Interior.

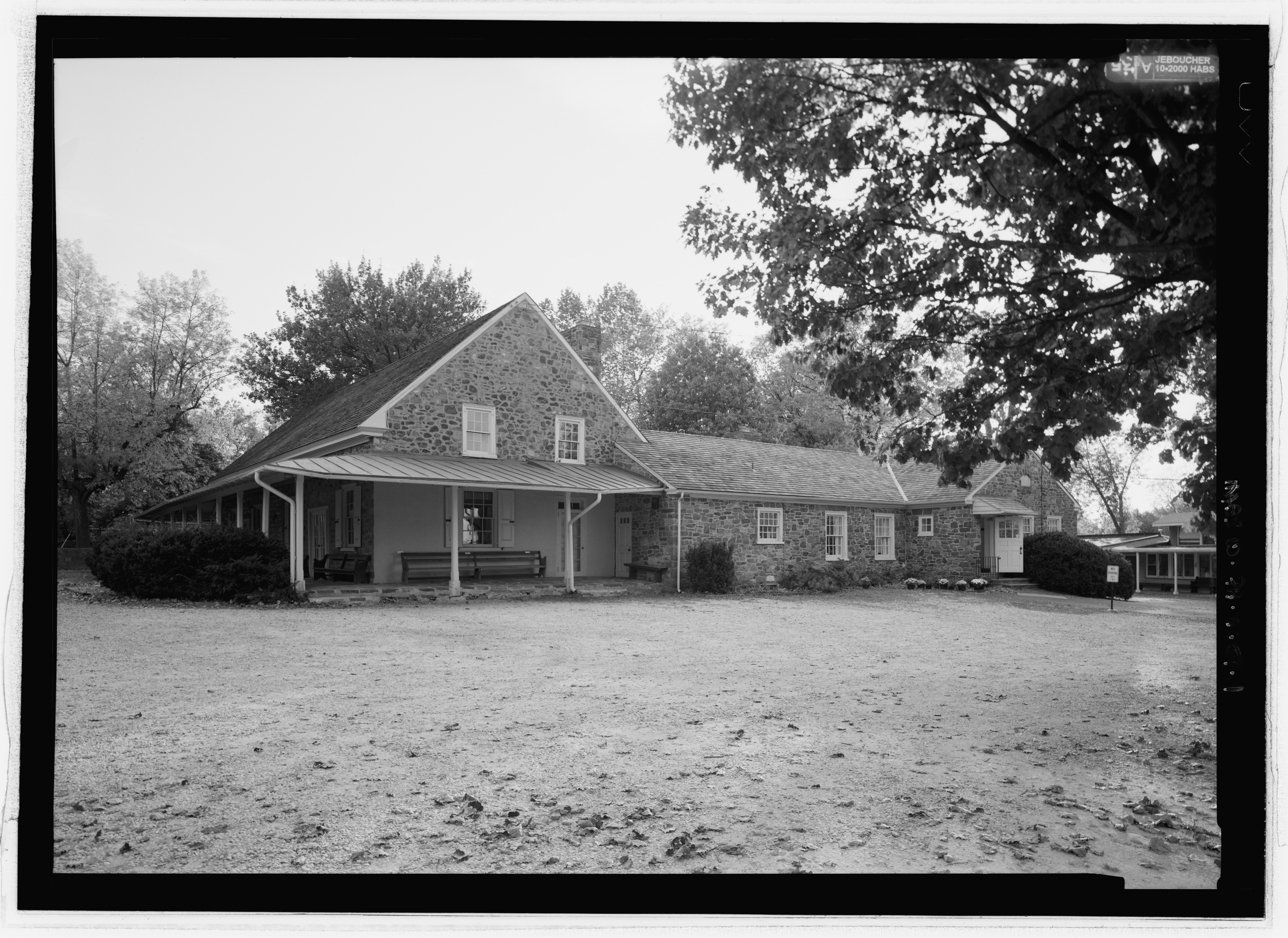
Rear addition.

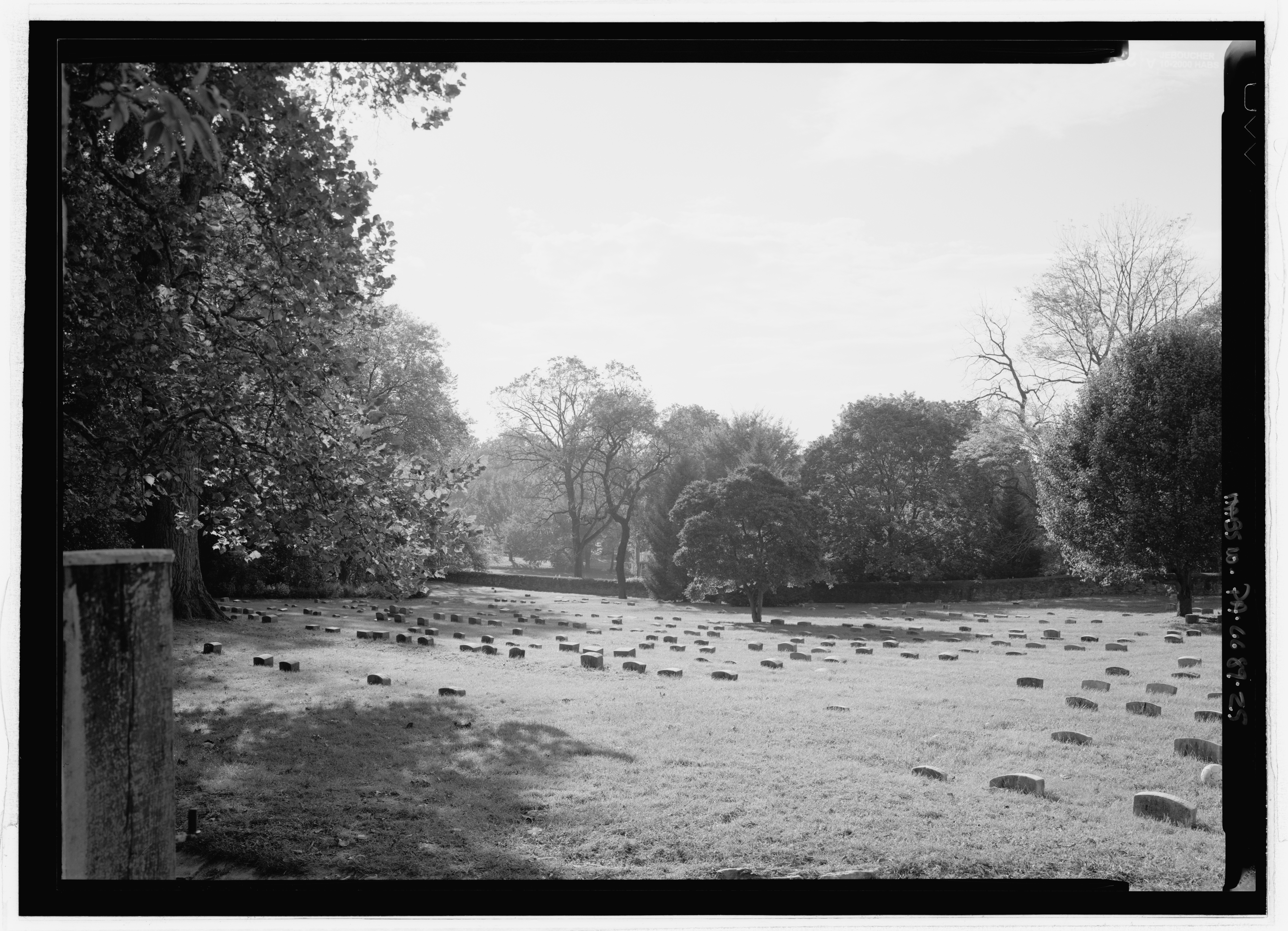
Burial ground.

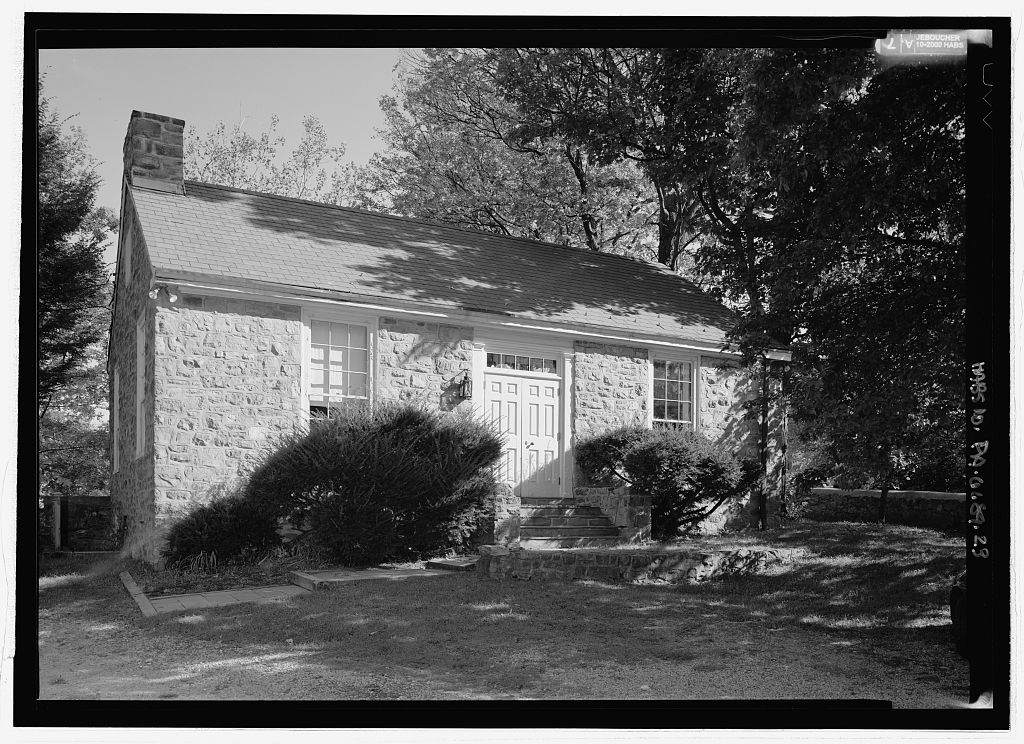
William Jeanes Memorial Library, built 1935.
