= Thomas Francis Kennedy (bishop) =

Catholic archbishop

Most Reverend Thomas F. Kennedy
- Rector of the Pontifical North American College
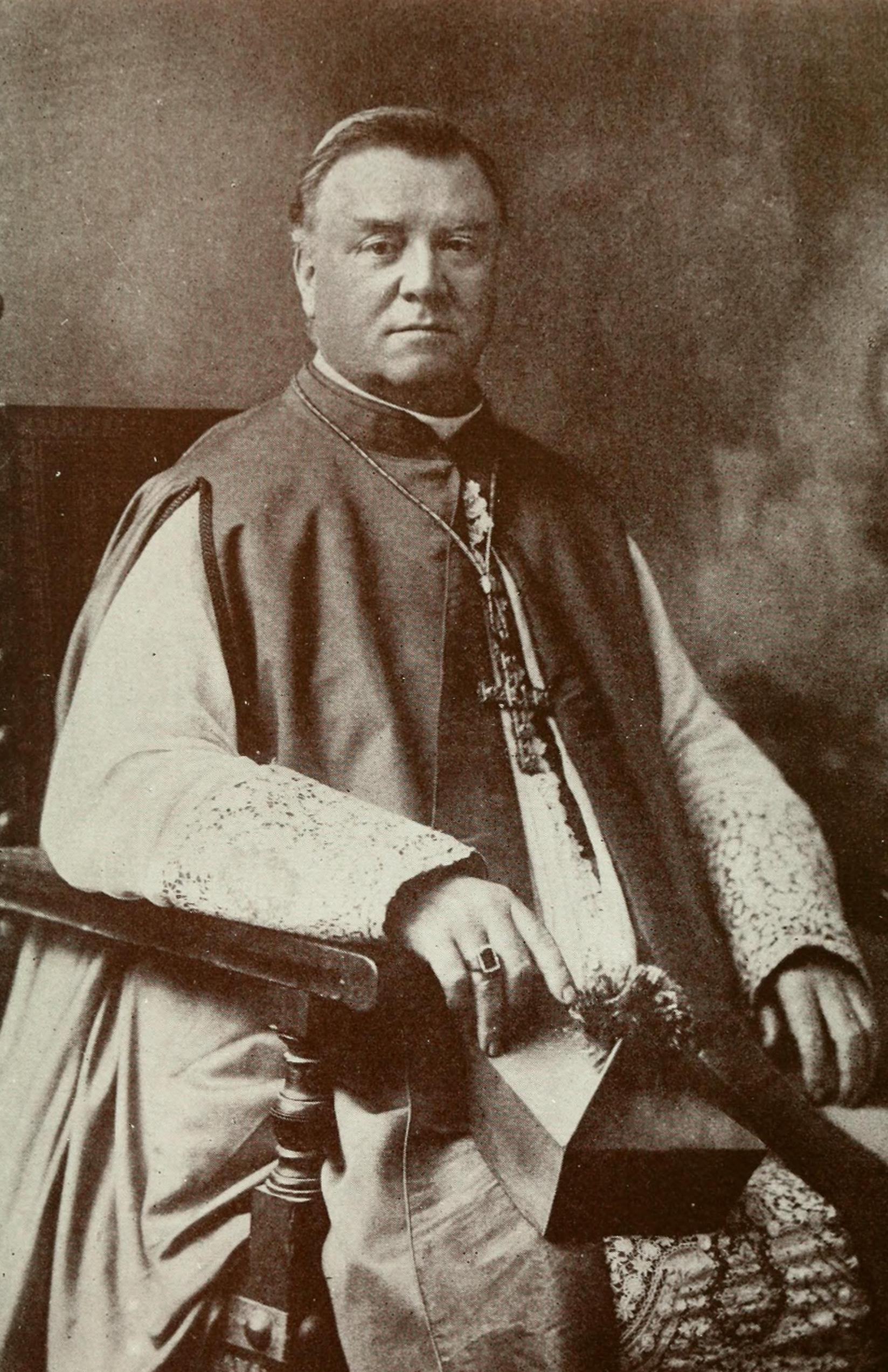
- Church: Catholic Church
- See: Titular Archbishop of Seleucia in Isauria
- Appointed: June 17, 1915
- Term ended: August 28, 1917

Orders
- Ordination: July 24, 1887 by Lucido Parocchi
- Consecration: December 29, 1907 by Girolamo Maria Gotti

Personal details
- Born: March 23, 1858 Plymouth Meeting, Pennsylvania, USA
- Died: August 28, 1917 (aged 59) Rome, Italy

Thomas Francis Kennedy (March 23, 1858 – August 28, 1917) was a bishop of the Catholic Church in the United States. He served as the rector of the Pontifical North American College from 1901 to 1917.

== Biography ==
=== Early life and education ===
Thomas Kennedy was born in Plymouth Meeting, Pennsylvania. His father, Patrick, worked as a laborer. He was educated in a local public school, St. Matthew's School and Treemont Seminary. Kennedy became a teacher at St. Matthew's High School at age 17 and then later became the principal. He entered St. Charles Borromeo Seminary to study for the priesthood and continued his studies in Rome at the Pontifical North American College.

Kennedy was ordained a priest in Rome for the Archdiocese of Philadelphia on July 24, 1887, by Cardinal Lucido Parocchi, the Vicar General of Rome. After he returned to Pennsylvania, Kennedy joined the faculty at St. Charles Borromeo Seminary. He was named the Rector of the Pontifical North American College on June 14, 1901.

=== Bishop ===
Pope Pius X appointed him as the Titular Bishop of Hadrianopolis in Honoriade on December 16, 1907. He was consecrated a bishop by Cardinal Girolamo Maria Gotti, OCD, the Prefect of the Congregation for Propagation of the Faith, on December 29, 1907. The principal co-consecrators were Archbishop Patrick Riordan of San Francisco and Bishop William Giles, Rector of the English College in Rome.

=== Archbishop ===
Kennedy was given the personal title of Archbishop by Pope Benedict XV on June 17, 1915. At the same time he was changed to the titular see of Seleucia in Isauria. He died in Rome on August 28, 1917, at the age of 59.

=== Portrait ===
In May 1907, whilst painting his first portrait of Pope Pius X, the Swiss-born American artist Adolfo Müller-Ury completed the first of two portraits of Bishop Kennedy whom he had befriended. This bust-length oval portrait, described by the New York Evening Mail as 'warmly tinted and attractive', was exhibited in January and February 1908 at Knoedler's Gallery in New York, The Corcoran Gallery in Washington, D.C., and in Philadelphia, before apparently being sent to Kennedy's two sisters, Theresa and Margaret, who apparently later gave it to the St. Charles Borromeo Seminary, Overbrook, Pennsylvania, where it hangs today outside the Eakins Room. Müller-Ury's second much-larger half-length standing portrait of Kennedy was executed in 1911 when he was in Rome painting Pope Pius X again (which he presented to the Catholic University in Washington, D.C.) and remains at the North American College in Rome's Graduate House.

=== Legacy ===
Archbishop Kennedy's birthplace (built c.1776), at 113 W. Germantown Pike, is a contributing property in the Plymouth Meeting Historic District.

Academic offices
Preceded by William Henry O'Connell	Rector of the Pontifical North American College; 1901–1917	Succeeded by Charles O'Hern
Catholic Church titles
Preceded by –	— TITULAR — Titular Bishop of Hadrianopolis in Honoriade; 1907–1915	Succeeded by –
Preceded by –	— TITULAR — Titular Bishop of Seleucia in Isauria; 1915–1917	Succeeded by –
