= National Register of Historic Places listings in Montgomery County, Pennsylvania =

Location of Montgomery County in Pennsylvania

This is a list of the National Register of Historic Places listings in Montgomery County, Pennsylvania.

This is intended to be a complete list of the properties and districts on National Register of Historic Places in Montgomery County, Pennsylvania, United States.

There are 162 properties and districts listed on the National Register in the county. Eleven sites are further designated National Historic Landmarks and one is designated a National Historical Park. Another three properties were once listed but have been removed.

This National Park Service list is complete through NPS recent listings posted October 2, 2026.

== Current listings ==
	Name on the Register	Image	Date listed	Location	Municipality	Description
1	Abington Township High School	Abington Township High School	August 2, 1985 (#85001676)	1801 Susquehanna Road; 40°06′51″N 75°07′12″W	Abington Township	Mostly demolished in 1996; only one small building survives.
2	Acorn Glove Company	Acorn Glove Company	September 8, 2026 (#100013387)	802-806 Gravel Pike; 40°25′38″N 75°32′01″W	Palm	
3	Henry Antes House	Henry Antes House	May 12, 1975 (#75001657)	Northeast of Pottstown on Colonial Road; 40°17′32″N 75°32′26″W	Upper Frederick Township	Headquarters of General George Washington, September 23 to 26, 1777.
4	Augustus Lutheran Church	Augustus Lutheran Church	December 24, 1967 (#67000019)	7th Avenue, East and Main Street; 40°12′05″N 75°28′51″W	Trappe	
5	Barley Sheaf Inn	Barley Sheaf Inn	December 10, 1980 (#80003580)	North of Norristown at 420 West Germantown Pike; 40°08′55″N 75°20′05″W	East Norriton Township	
6	Bauern Freund Print Shop	Bauern Freund Print Shop	July 26, 1982 (#82003801)	Pennsylvania Route 63; 40°19′44″N 75°27′09″W	Marlborough Township	
7	Bergy Bridge Historic District	Bergy Bridge Historic District	October 10, 1973 (#73001644)	Northwest of Harleysville off Pennsylvania Route 63; 40°18′08″N 75°25′21″W	Upper Salford Township	
8	Beth Sholom Synagogue	Beth Sholom Synagogue	March 29, 2007 (#07000430)	8231 Old York Road; 40°05′03″N 75°07′35″W	Cheltenham Township	Frank Lloyd Wright, architect.
9	Black Horse Inn	Black Horse Inn	July 5, 2005 (#89000144)	1432 Bethlehem Pike, Flourtown; 40°06′13″N 75°12′48″W	Springfield Township	
10	Black Rock Bridge	Black Rock Bridge	June 22, 1988 (#88000735)	Pennsylvania Route 113 over the Schuylkill River; 40°09′32″N 75°30′44″W	Upper Providence Township	Extends into Chester County
11	Boyertown Burial Casket Company	Boyertown Burial Casket Company	December 21, 2017 (#100001910)	401 W. 4th St. 40°24′19″N 75°30′25″W	East Greenville	
12	Henry W. Breyer Sr. House	Henry W. Breyer Sr. House	February 20, 2004 (#04000065)	8230 Old York Road; 40°04′53″N 75°07′41″W	Cheltenham Township	
13	Bridge in Franconia Township	Bridge in Franconia Township	June 22, 1988 (#88000856)	Allentown Road over Skippack Creek near Elvoy; 40°17′18″N 75°20′20″W	Franconia Township	
14	Bridge in Hatfield Township	Bridge in Hatfield Township	June 22, 1988 (#88000861)	Orvilla Road over western branch of the Neshaminy Creek; 40°17′02″N 75°16′23″W	Hatfield Township	
15	Bridge in Upper Merion Township	Bridge in Upper Merion Township	June 22, 1988 (#88000832)	South Gulph Road over Gulph Creek; 40°04′08″N 75°20′28″W	Upper Merion Township	
16	Bryn Athyn Historic District	Bryn Athyn Historic District	October 6, 2008 (#08001087)	Huntington Pike and Cathedral Road; 40°08′21″N 75°03′46″W	Bryn Athyn	
17	Bryn Athyn-Lower Moreland Bridge	Bryn Athyn-Lower Moreland Bridge	June 22, 1988 (#88000831)	Byberry Road over a branch of Pennypack Creek; 40°09′31″N 75°04′30″W	Lower Moreland Township	
18	Bryn Mawr	Bryn Mawr	July 2, 1973 (#73001643)	500 Harriton Road; 40°02′05″N 75°18′41″W	Lower Merion Township	
19	Bryn Mawr College Historic District	Bryn Mawr College Historic District	May 4, 1979 (#79002299)	Morris Avenue, Yarrow Street and New Gulph Road; 40°01′35″N 75°18′49″W	Lower Merion Township	
20	Bryn Mawr Hotel	Bryn Mawr Hotel	April 27, 1979 (#79002300)	Morris and Montgomery Avenues; 40°01′23″N 75°18′46″W	Lower Merion Township	
21	Cairnwood	Cairnwood	March 21, 2002 (#02000223)	3028 Huntington Pike; 40°08′21″N 75°03′46″W	Bryn Athyn	
22	Camptown Historic District	Camptown Historic District	October 31, 1985 (#85003434)	Roughly bounded by Penrose Avenue, Graham Lane, Dennis Street, and Cheltenham Avenue; 40°03′57″N 75°08′40″W	Cheltenham Township	
23	Carson College for Orphan Girls	Carson College for Orphan Girls	March 15, 1991 (#91000227)	Between West Mill and Wissahickon Roads, Flourtown; 40°06′00″N 75°13′16″W	Springfield Township	
24	Central Norristown Historic District	Central Norristown Historic District	November 23, 1984 (#84000321)	Roughly bounded by Stoney Creek, Walnut, Lafayette, and Fornace Streets; 40°07′04″N 75°20′22″W	Norristown	
25	Cold Point Historic District	Cold Point Historic District	September 9, 1983 (#83002261)	Interstate 276, Butler Pike, Militia Hill and Narcissa Roads; 40°06′52″N 75°16′06″W	Plymouth and Whitemarsh Townships	
26	Warren Z. Cole House	Warren Z. Cole House	March 7, 1973 (#73001653)	Skippack Pike and Evansburg Road; 40°13′16″N 75°23′20″W	Skippack Township	
27	Compton and Bloomfield	Compton and Bloomfield	December 22, 1978 (#78002445)	9414 Meadowbrook Avenue; 40°05′21″N 75°13′29″W	Springfield Township	Bloomfield House is in Northwest Philadelphia
28	Continental Stove Works	Continental Stove Works	January 9, 1986 (#86000040)	First Street above Main; 40°11′04″N 75°32′44″W	Royersford	
29	Alan W. Corson Homestead	Alan W. Corson Homestead	June 19, 1973 (#73001649)	5130 Butler Pike; 40°07′00″N 75°15′55″W	Whitemarsh Township	
30	County Bridge No. 54	County Bridge No. 54	June 22, 1988 (#88000837)	Morris Road, over a branch of Wissahickon Creek that arises near Prospectville; 40°08′22″N 75°13′01″W	Whitemarsh Township	
31	Curtis Arboretum	Curtis Arboretum	March 20, 2002 (#02000229)	1250 West Church Road; 40°05′05″N 75°08′52″W	Cheltenham Township	
32	Dawesfield	Dawesfield	March 29, 1991 (#91000318)	565 Lewis Lane, Ambler; 40°09′12″N 75°14′53″W	Whitpain Township	
33	Elkins Railroad Station, Philadelphia and Reading Railroad	Elkins Railroad Station, Philadelphia and Reading Railroad	October 25, 1990 (#90001609)	Junction of Spring and Park Avenues, Cheltenham Township; 40°04′16″N 75°07′42″W	Cheltenham Township	Cope & Stewardson, architects.
34	John Englehardt Homestead	John Englehardt Homestead	June 4, 1973 (#73001650)	West of Schwenksville off Pennsylvania Route 73 on Keyser Road; 40°16′57″N 75°31′54″W	Upper Frederick Township	
35	Erdenheim Farm	Erdenheim Farm	June 10, 2026 (#100012882)	Roughly Bounded by Stenton Avenue, West Mill Road, Wissachickon Avenue, and Thomas Road; 40°05′58″N 75°13′46″W	Lafayette	
36	William and Mordecai Evans House	William and Mordecai Evans House	April 20, 2005 (#05000332)	1206 Main Street, Linfield; 40°12′35″N 75°34′19″W	Limerick Township	
37	Evansburg Historic District	Evansburg Historic District	June 19, 1972 (#72001139)	On Germantown Pike, bounded by Cross Key Road, Grange Avenue, Mill Road, and Ridge Pike; 40°10′51″N 75°25′20″W	Lower Providence, Skippack, and Worcester Townships	
38	Fagleysville Road Bridge Crossing Swamp Creek	Fagleysville Road Bridge Crossing Swamp Creek	June 22, 1988 (#88000864)	Fagleysville Road over Swamp Creek; 40°16′28″N 75°29′07″W	Fagleysville vicinity	
39	Farmar Mill	Farmar Mill	May 19, 1972 (#72001140)	North of Flourtown at the junction of Bethlehem Pike and Pennsylvania Route 73; 40°07′26″N 75°13′10″W	Whitemarsh Township	
40	Fetter's Mill	Fetter's Mill	May 27, 1999 (#99000647)	2543 Fetter's Mill Drive, Bryn Athyn; 40°07′47″N 75°04′20″W	Lower Moreland Township	
41	Fetter's Mill Village Historic District	Fetter's Mill Village Historic District	August 16, 2006 (#05001212)	Fetter's Mill Road and Pennypack Lane; 40°07′55″N 75°04′18″W	Bryn Athyn and Lower Moreland Township	
42	Dr. Norman & Doris Fisher House	Dr. Norman & Doris Fisher House	March 31, 2014 (#14000095)	197 E. Mill Rd. 40°10′01″N 75°06′30″W	Hatboro	Louis I. Kahn, architect
43	Franklinville School	Franklinville School	December 29, 2014 (#14001102)	1701 Morris Rd. 40°10′58″N 75°17′00″W	Whitpain Township	
44	Gerloff Road Bridge Crossing Swamp Creek	Gerloff Road Bridge Crossing Swamp Creek	June 22, 1988 (#88000838)	Gerloff Road over Swamp Creek near Zieglersville; 40°17′10″N 75°32′39″W	Lower Frederick Township vicinity	
45	Gladwyne Historic District	Gladwyne Historic District	December 10, 1980 (#80003577)	Pennsylvania Route 23; 40°02′12″N 75°16′52″W	Lower Merion Township	
46	Glencairn	Glencairn	August 31, 1978 (#78002434)	1001 Papermill Road; 40°08′11″N 75°03′53″W	Bryn Athyn	
47	Glenside Memorial Hall	Glenside Memorial Hall	May 12, 2004 (#04000438)	185 Keswick Avenue; 40°05′51″N 75°09′12″W	Cheltenham Township	
48	Globe Knitting Mills	Globe Knitting Mills	January 31, 2003 (#02001745)	660 and 694 East Main Street; 40°06′40″N 75°19′54″W	Norristown	
49	Graeme Park	Graeme Park	October 15, 1966 (#66000672)	Keith Valley Road; 40°12′55″N 75°09′06″W	Horsham Township	
50	Green Hill Farms	Green Hill Farms	December 15, 2011 (#11000925)	6 East Lancaster Avenue; 39°59′19″N 75°15′20″W	Lower Merion Township	
51	Grey Towers	Grey Towers	February 14, 1980 (#80003578)	Easton Road and Limekiln Pike; 40°04′53″N 75°09′54″W	Cheltenham Township	Horace Trumbauer, architect.
52	Grubb Mansion	Grubb Mansion	May 1, 1991 (#91000505)	1304 High Street; 40°14′30″N 75°37′17″W	Pottstown	
53	Conrad Grubb Homestead	Conrad Grubb Homestead	June 19, 1973 (#73001651)	Northwest of Schwenksville off Pennsylvania Route 73 on Perkiomenville Road; 40°18′10″N 75°30′49″W	Upper Frederick Township	
54	Gwynedd Hall	Gwynedd Hall	September 24, 1985 (#85002474)	1244 Meetinghouse Road; 40°12′11″N 75°14′43″W	Lower Gwynedd Township	
55	Hanging Rock	Hanging Rock	December 24, 1997 (#97001251)	1144 South Gulph Road; 40°03′55″N 75°20′31″W	Upper Merion Township	
56	Harriton	Harriton	October 31, 1985 (#85003472)	1401-1415 Old Gulph Road; 40°02′29″N 75°19′19″W	Lower Merion Township	
57	Hatfield Borough Substation, Lock Up and Firehouse	Hatfield Borough Substation, Lock Up and Firehouse	January 12, 2016 (#15000972)	Cherry at Diamond and Fretz Sts. 40°16′55″N 75°17′55″W	Hatfield	
58	George K. Heller School	George K. Heller School	May 2, 2001 (#01000461)	439 Ashbourne Road, Ashmead Village; 40°03′49″N 75°05′58″W	Cheltenham Township	
59	High Street Historic District	High Street Historic District	January 28, 1992 (#91001756)	631-1329 High Street; 40°14′34″N 75°37′46″W	Pottstown	
60	The Highlands	The Highlands	December 12, 1976 (#76001653)	West of central Whitemarsh Township at Skippack Pike and Sheaff Lane; 40°08′04″N 75°13′56″W	Whitemarsh Township	
61	Hope Lodge	Hope Lodge	April 26, 1972 (#72001141)	553 Bethlehem Pike; 40°07′34″N 75°12′59″W	Whitemarsh Township	
62	Horsham Friends Meeting	Horsham Friends Meeting	June 21, 1991 (#91000723)	Junction of Meeting House and Easton Roads; 40°11′00″N 75°07′57″W	Horsham Township	
63	Horsham-Montgomery Bridge	Horsham-Montgomery Bridge	June 22, 1988 (#88000836)	Lower State Road over Little Neshaminy Creek; 40°14′15″N 75°11′31″W	Horsham and Montgomery Townships	
64	Hovenden House, Barn and Abolition Hall	Hovenden House, Barn and Abolition Hall	February 18, 1971 (#71000713)	1 East Germantown Pike; 40°06′10″N 75°16′41″W	Whitemarsh Township	
65	Humane Fire Engine Company No. 1	Humane Fire Engine Company No. 1	November 25, 2019 (#100004663)	301 Walnut St. 40°11′00″N 75°32′23″W	Royersford	
66	Isaac Hunsberger House	Isaac Hunsberger House	June 22, 2000 (#00000719)	545 West Ridge Pike; 40°13′57″N 75°31′38″W	Limerick Township	
67	Idlewild Farm Complex	Idlewild Farm Complex	January 20, 1984 (#84003505)	617 Williamson Road; 40°02′09″N 75°17′36″W	Lower Merion Township	
68	Jefferson Elementary School	Jefferson Elementary School	September 30, 2003 (#03000723)	Beech and Warren Streets; 40°14′54″N 75°38′22″W	Pottstown	
69	Jenkins Homestead	Jenkins Homestead	September 15, 1977 (#77001176)	137 Jenkins Avenue; 40°14′17″N 75°16′56″W	Lansdale	
70	Jenkins' Town Lyceum Building	Jenkins' Town Lyceum Building	October 16, 1979 (#79002303)	Old York and Vista Roads; 40°05′55″N 75°07′32″W	Jenkintown	Furness & Evans, architects.
71	Jenkintown Wyncote Train Station	Jenkintown Wyncote Train Station	December 29, 2014 (#14001103)	3 West Ave. 40°05′36″N 75°08′17″W	Jenkintown and Cheltenham Township	
72	Jacob Kastner Loghouse	Jacob Kastner Loghouse	July 15, 1996 (#96000708)	416 Norristown Road, Spring House; 40°10′48″N 75°12′50″W	Lower Gwynedd Township	
73	Keefe-Mumbower Mill	Keefe-Mumbower Mill	August 8, 2008 (#08000784)	Northeastern corner of the junction of Swedesford and Township Line Roads; 40°11′10″N 75°16′45″W	Upper Gwynedd Township	
74	Kenderdine Mill Complex	Kenderdine Mill Complex	January 22, 1992 (#91002011)	Junction of Keith Valley and Davis Grove Roads; 40°12′32″N 75°10′15″W	Horsham Township	
75	Kennedy Mansion	Kennedy Mansion	June 21, 1983 (#83002262)	1050 Valley Forge Road; 40°06′15″N 75°25′15″W	Upper Merion Township	One of five surviving buildings from the demolished village of Port Kennedy. Now part of Valley Forge National Historical Park.
76	Keswick Theatre	Keswick Theatre	June 30, 1983 (#83002263)	291 Keswick Avenue; 40°06′23″N 75°08′51″W	Abington Township	Horace Trumbauer, architect.
77	King of Prussia Inn	King of Prussia Inn	December 23, 1975 (#75001656)	101 Bill Smith Boulevard; 40°05′14″N 75°22′40″W	Upper Merion Township	
78	Klein Meetinghouse	Klein Meetinghouse	April 13, 1973 (#73001645)	Maple Avenue; 40°17′31″N 75°22′34″W	Lower Salford Township	
79	Knapp Farm	Knapp Farm	October 22, 1976 (#76001656)	South of Montgomeryville off Pennsylvania Route 309; 40°13′48″N 75°14′49″W	Montgomery Township	
80	Knipe-Johnson Farm	Knipe-Johnson Farm	November 8, 2000 (#00001346)	606 DeKalb Pike; 40°13′02″N 75°15′04″W	Upper Gwynedd Township	
81	Knipe-Moore-Rupp Farm	Knipe-Moore-Rupp Farm	November 7, 2003 (#03001124)	Hancock Road and Prospect Avenue, North Wales; 40°13′13″N 75°15′28″W	Upper Gwynedd Township	
82	Knurr Log House	Knurr Log House	November 5, 1974 (#74001795)	Meng Road, Delphi; 40°16′05″N 75°28′39″W	Lower Frederick Township	
83	Dielman Kolb Homestead	Dielman Kolb Homestead	August 17, 1973 (#73001647)	South of Lederach on Kinsey Road, Lederach; 40°14′56″N 75°24′06″W	Lower Salford Township	
84	Isaac Kulp Farm	Isaac Kulp Farm	March 12, 1999 (#99000323)	Junction of North Swedesford and Hancock Roads; 40°12′54″N 75°15′12″W	Upper Gwynedd Township	
85	Kuster Mill	Kuster Mill	March 24, 1971 (#71000711)	On Skippack Creek at Mill Road and Water Street Road near Collegeville; 40°11′17″N 75°24′33″W	Skippack Township	
86	Lady Washington Inn	Lady Washington Inn	November 26, 1982 (#82001541)	2550 Huntington Pike; 40°07′28″N 75°03′50″W	Lower Moreland Township	
87	Landis Homestead	Landis Homestead	October 10, 1973 (#73001654)	Southwest of Tylersport off Pennsylvania Route 563 on Morwood Road; 40°19′11″N 75°24′40″W	Salford Township	
88	Lansdale Silk Hosiery Compy-Interstate Hosiery Mills, Inc.	Lansdale Silk Hosiery Compy-Interstate Hosiery Mills, Inc.	December 3, 2004 (#04001289)	200 South Line Street; 40°14′21″N 75°16′54″W	Lansdale	
89	Lee Tire and Rubber Company	Lee Tire and Rubber Company	August 23, 1984 (#84003512)	1100 Hector Street; 40°04′34″N 75°17′17″W	Whitemarsh Township	
90	Loller Academy	Loller Academy	August 24, 1978 (#78002435)	424 South York Road; 40°10′16″N 75°06′39″W	Hatboro	
91	Long Meadow Farm	Long Meadow Farm	June 19, 1973 (#73001652)	Northwest of Schwenksville on Pennsylvania Route 73; 40°18′34″N 75°32′16″W	New Hanover Township	
92	Lower Merion Academy-Cynwyd Elementary School-Bala Cynwyd Junior High School Complex	Lower Merion Academy-Cynwyd Elementary School-Bala Cynwyd Junior High School Complex	November 27, 2002 (#02001429)	506 Bryn Mawr Avenue; 40°00′48″N 75°14′34″W	Lower Merion Township	
93	Lynnewood Hall	Lynnewood Hall	August 13, 2025 (#100012095)	920 Spring Avenue; 40°04′31″N 75°08′27″W	Elkins Park	
94	Merion Cricket Club	Merion Cricket Club	February 27, 1987 (#87000759)	Montgomery Avenue and Grays Ln. 40°00′56″N 75°17′53″W	Lower Merion Township	Furness & Evans, architects.
95	Merion Friends Meeting House	Merion Friends Meeting House	August 5, 1998 (#98001194)	615 Montgomery Avenue; 40°00′34″N 75°15′17″W	Lower Merion Township	
96	Meyerhoff, Son and Company Building	Meyerhoff, Son and Company Building	December 21, 2017 (#100001911)	300 Cherry St. 40°14′32″N 75°38′53″W	Pottstown	
97	Mill Creek Historic District	Mill Creek Historic District	December 10, 1980 (#80003575)	Near and east of Bryn Mawr; also roughly bounded by the Schuylkill River, Mill Creek, and Righter's Mill, Rose Glen, and Monk's Roads; 40°01′32″N 75°17′08″W	Lower Merion Township	Second set of boundaries represents a boundary increase of August 30, 1996
98	Mill Grove	Mill Grove	March 16, 1972 (#72001138)	Pawling Road; 40°07′37″N 75°26′28″W	Lower Providence Township	
99	Miller's House at Spring Mill	Miller's House at Spring Mill	January 4, 1990 (#89002281)	North Lane and Hector Street; 40°04′30″N 75°17′07″W	Whitemarsh Township	
100	Milmoral	Milmoral	January 31, 2003 (#02001746)	1150 Church Road, Wyncote; 40°05′02″N 75°08′47″W	Cheltenham Township	
101	Edward Morgan Log House	Edward Morgan Log House	May 17, 1973 (#73001646)	Off Pennsylvania Route 363 on Weikel Road near Kulpsville; 40°14′42″N 75°18′46″W	Towamencin Township	
102	Anthony Morris House	Anthony Morris House	December 3, 1980 (#80003581)	North of Norristown on Stump Hall Road; 40°11′13″N 75°22′07″W	Worcester Township	
103	Mount Joy	Mount Joy	March 11, 1971 (#71000712)	North Lane and Hector Street; 40°04′36″N 75°17′12″W	Whitemarsh Township	
104	Henry Melchior Muhlenberg House	Henry Melchior Muhlenberg House	February 18, 2000 (#00000060)	201 West Main Street; 40°11′47″N 75°28′13″W	Trappe	
105	Narbrook Park Historic District	Narbrook Park Historic District	November 7, 2003 (#03001122)	Narbrook Road and Windsor Avenue; 40°00′26″N 75°16′00″W	Narberth	
106	Normandy Farmstead	Normandy Farmstead	May 10, 2001 (#01000502)	1411 Morris Rd. near Blue Bell; 40°10′50″N 75°16′45″W	Whitpain Township	
107	Oak Park Historic District	Oak Park Historic District	July 23, 1998 (#98000897)	Roughly along Oak Park Road, Park Avenue, Oak Boulevard, Forest Avenue, and Squirrel Lane; 40°15′11″N 75°17′57″W	Hatfield Township	
108	Old Norriton Presbyterian Church	Old Norriton Presbyterian Church	April 3, 1979 (#79002304)	Northwest of Norristown on Germantown Pike; 40°09′30″N 75°22′25″W	East Norriton Township	
109	Old Pottstown Historic District	Old Pottstown Historic District	September 5, 1985 (#85001955)	Roughly bounded by South, Race, Bailey, Adams, Lincoln, Beech, and Manatawny Streets; 40°14′44″N 75°38′48″W	Pottstown	
110	Pennypacker Mansion	Pennypacker Mansion	November 7, 1976 (#76001657)	5 Haldeman Road; 40°15′15″N 75°27′28″W	Perkiomen Township	
111	Perkiomen Bridge	Perkiomen Bridge	June 22, 1988 (#88000826)	Ridge Pike over Perkiomen Creek; 40°11′03″N 75°26′54″W	Collegeville and Lower Providence Township	
112	Perkiomen Bridge Hotel	Perkiomen Bridge Hotel	January 3, 1985 (#85000037)	Main Street and Route 29; 40°11′05″N 75°26′59″W	Collegeville	
113	Philadelphia & Reading Railway: Lansdale Passenger Station	Philadelphia & Reading Railway: Lansdale Passenger Station	December 13, 2021 (#100007217)	80 West Main St. 40°14′35″N 75°17′07″W	Lansdale	
114	Plymouth Friends Meetinghouse	Plymouth Friends Meetinghouse	February 18, 1971 (#71000714)	Corner of Germantown and Butler Pikes; 40°06′08″N 75°16′48″W	Plymouth Township	
115	Plymouth Meeting Historic District	Plymouth Meeting Historic District	February 18, 1971 (#71000715)	Plymouth Meeting and Whitemarsh Townships; 40°06′02″N 75°16′39″W	Plymouth and Whitemarsh Townships	
116	Poplar Lane	Poplar Lane	May 22, 1978 (#78002436)	1000 Boxwood Court, near King of Prussia; 40°04′14″N 75°20′17″W	Upper Merion Township	
117	Pottsgrove Mansion	Pottsgrove Mansion	January 18, 1974 (#74001796)	West of Pottstown on Benjamin Franklin Highway (High Street); 40°14′52″N 75°39′35″W	Pottstown	
118	Pottstown Roller Mill	Pottstown Roller Mill	October 10, 1974 (#74001797)	South and Hanover Streets; 40°14′36″N 75°39′08″W	Pottstown	
119	Quaker Manor House	Quaker Manor House	November 21, 1976 (#76001654)	1165 Pinetown Road; 40°08′43″N 75°11′20″W	Upper Dublin Township	
120	Reading Railroad Pottstown Station	Reading Railroad Pottstown Station	January 12, 1984 (#84003514)	High Street between Hanover and York Streets; 40°14′41″N 75°39′09″W	Pottstown	Clark Dillenbeck, architect.
121	Red Hill Historic District	Red Hill Historic District	October 31, 1985 (#85003428)	148, 152, and 200-600 Main Street, 98-226 and 21-231 West Sixth Street, and 532-550 Adams Street; 40°22′33″N 75°29′02″W	Red Hill	
122	Andreas Rieth Homestead	Andreas Rieth Homestead	September 19, 1973 (#73001648)	Southeast of Pennsburg on Geryville Pike; 40°22′11″N 75°27′33″W	Marlborough Township	
123	David Rittenhouse Junior High School	David Rittenhouse Junior High School	June 28, 1996 (#96000717)	1705 Locust Street; 40°07′47″N 75°19′53″W	Norristown	
124	Roberts and Mander Stove Company Buildings	Roberts and Mander Stove Company Buildings	August 7, 2005 (#05000799)	Roughly along Jacksonville Road, Tanner Avenue, and Lincoln Avenue; 40°10′59″N 75°05′54″W	Hatboro	
125	Rowland House	Rowland House	October 25, 1979 (#79002301)	300 Ashbourne Road; 40°03′34″N 75°05′47″W	Cheltenham Township	
126	Sanatoga Union Sunday School	Sanatoga Union Sunday School	August 4, 2004 (#04000805)	2341 East High Street; 40°14′42″N 75°35′40″W	Lower Pottsgrove Township	
127	William and Caroline Schall House	William and Caroline Schall House	October 11, 2007 (#07001079)	100 Main Street; 40°20′19″N 75°28′19″W	Green Lane	
128	Schuylkill Navigation Canal, Oakes Reach Section	Schuylkill Navigation Canal, Oakes Reach Section	May 6, 1988 (#88000462)	Northern and eastern bank of the Schuylkill River from Pennsylvania Route 113 to Lock 61; 40°07′57″N 75°30′10″W	Upper Providence Township	Extends into Chester County
129	Seville Theatre	Seville Theatre	December 28, 2005 (#05001491)	822-826 West Lancaster Avenue; 40°01′24″N 75°19′08″W	Lower Merion Township	
130	Joseph Sinnott Mansion	Joseph Sinnott Mansion	August 29, 1980 (#80003582)	Montgomery and Lendover Avenues; 40°02′00″N 75°19′46″W	Lower Merion Township	Hazelhurst & Huckel, architects; now on Rosemont College campus
131	Skippack Bridge	Skippack Bridge	December 2, 1970 (#70000551)	East of Evansburg on Pennsylvania Route 422; 40°10′49″N 75°25′20″W	Lower Providence Township	
132	Souderton Historic District	Souderton Historic District	June 10, 2011 (#10001107)	Roughly bounded by Railroad Avenue, East Broad Street, Noble Street, Spruce Alley, South Front Street, and Washington Avenue; 40°18′42″N 75°19′31″W	Souderton	
133	Springfield Mill	Springfield Mill	May 13, 1976 (#76001652)	On Northwestern Avenue between Germantown Avenue and Bethlehem Pike in Erdenheim; 40°05′27″N 75°13′51″W	Springfield Township	
134	St. Paul's Episcopal Church	St. Paul's Episcopal Church	April 22, 1982 (#82003800)	Old York and Ashbourne Roads; 40°04′16″N 75°00′47″W	Cheltenham Township	Horace Trumbauer, architect.
135	Stanley	Stanley	May 10, 2005 (#05000415)	8500 Pine Road, Philadelphia; 40°05′25″N 75°04′29″W	Abington Township	Extends into Northeast Philadelphia
136	Gen. Thomas J. Stewart Memorial Armory	Gen. Thomas J. Stewart Memorial Armory	July 12, 1991 (#91000904)	340 Harding Boulevard; 40°07′28″N 75°20′41″W	Norristown	
137	Walter and Gertrude May Stewart Farmstead	Walter and Gertrude May Stewart Farmstead	May 19, 2015 (#15000241)	2600 Line Lexington Rd. 40°16′26″N 75°16′23″W	Hatfield Township	
138	Stotesbury Club House	Stotesbury Club House	March 7, 1985 (#85000468)	7830 Eastern Avenue; 40°04′58″N 75°11′44″W	Springfield Township	
139	Strawbridge and Clothier Store	Strawbridge and Clothier Store	December 22, 1988 (#88003047)	Old York Road north of Rydal Road; 40°06′06″N 75°07′32″W	Jenkintown	
140	Sunnybrook	Sunnybrook	August 11, 2005 (#05000855)	50 Sunnybrook Road; 40°14′55″N 75°36′39″W	Lower Pottsgrove Township	
141	Sunrise Mill	Sunrise Mill	April 11, 1977 (#77001177)	3 miles (4.8 km) west of Schwenksville on Neiffer Road; 40°16′24″N 75°31′13″W	Upper Frederick Township	
142	Sutch Road Bridge in Marlborough Township	Sutch Road Bridge in Marlborough Township	June 22, 1988 (#88000859)	Sutch Road over Unami Creek near Milford; 40°22′04″N 75°25′24″W	Marlborough Township	
143	Swamp Creek Road Bridge	Swamp Creek Road Bridge	June 22, 1988 (#88000860)	Swamp Creek Road over Unami Creek near Sumneytown; 40°20′03″N 75°26′59″W	Marlborough Township	
144	Old Library, Bryn Mawr College	Old Library, Bryn Mawr College	July 17, 1991 (#91002052)	Bounded by Morris, Yarrow, Wyndon and New Gulph Roads, Bryn Mawr College campus 40°01′36″N 75°18′52″W	Lower Merion Township	Cope & Stewardson, architects.
145	Union Library Company	Union Library Company	November 20, 1980 (#80003579)	243 South York Road; 40°10′31″N 75°06′24″W	Hatboro	
146	Union School	Union School	August 11, 1980 (#80003576)	516-518 Bethlehem Pike; 40°07′43″N 75°13′06″W	Whitemarsh Township	
147	Upper Roxborough Historic District	Upper Roxborough Historic District	May 2, 2001 (#01000463)	Roughly bounded by Shawmont Avenue, Hagy's Mill Road, and the Schuylkill River; 40°03′29″N 75°15′06″W	Springfield and Whitemarsh Townships	Extends into Northwest Philadelphia
148	Valley Forge National Historical Park	Valley Forge National Historical Park	October 15, 1966 (#66000657)	Valley Forge State Park; 40°05′48″N 75°26′55″W	Lower Providence and Upper Merion Townships	Extends into Chester County
149	Wall House	Wall House	June 28, 1979 (#79002302)	Wall Park Drive; 40°04′42″N 75°07′44″W	Cheltenham Township	
150	Washington Hose and Steam Fire Engine Company, No. 1	Washington Hose and Steam Fire Engine Company, No. 1	November 20, 1975 (#75001655)	15 West Hector Street; 40°04′24″N 75°18′28″W	Conshohocken	
151	Washington's Headquarters	Washington's Headquarters	February 11, 1973 (#73001655)	Valley Creek Road near junction of Pennsylvania Routes 23 and 252; 40°06′05″N 75°27′43″W	Upper Merion Township	
152	Washington Memorial Chapel	Washington Memorial Chapel	May 1, 2017 (#100000943)	N. side of Pennsylvania Route 23, approx. 1.25 mi. W. of the jct. with County Line Rd. 40°06′16″N 75°26′17″W	Upper Merion Township	
153	General Wayne Inn	General Wayne Inn	January 1, 1976 (#76001655)	625 Montgomery Avenue; 40°00′33″N 75°15′13″W	Lower Merion Township	
154	John Welsh House	John Welsh House	September 5, 1990 (#90001415)	8765 Stenton Avenue; 40°05′02″N 75°12′19″W	Springfield Township	
155	Peter Wentz Homestead	Peter Wentz Homestead	May 8, 1973 (#73001656)	Schultz Road; 40°11′56″N 75°20′02″W	Worcester Township	
156	West Laurel Hill Cemetery	West Laurel Hill Cemetery	August 14, 1992 (#92000991)	227 Belmont Avenue, Bala Cynwyd; 40°00′53″N 75°13′23″W	Lower Merion Township	
157	West Norristown Historic District	West Norristown Historic District	November 23, 1984 (#84000323)	Roughly bounded by Stoney Creek, Selma and Elm Streets; 40°07′18″N 75°21′09″W	Norristown	
158	Whitehall Apartments	Whitehall Apartments	December 28, 1983 (#83004238)	410 West Lancaster Avenue; 40°00′48″N 75°18′10″W	Lower Merion Township	
159	Whitpain Public School	Whitpain Public School	December 20, 2006 (#06001150)	799 Skippack Pike; 40°08′23″N 75°16′30″W	Whitpain Township	
160	Woodmont	Woodmont	August 5, 1998 (#98001192)	1622 Spring Mill Road; 40°04′03″N 75°17′39″W	Lower Merion Township	William Lightfoot Price, architect.
161	Wyncote Historic District	Wyncote Historic District	October 16, 1986 (#86002884)	Roughly bounded by Glenview Avenue, SEPTA railroad line, Webster Avenue, and Church Road; 40°05′23″N 75°08′33″W	Cheltenham Township	
162	Yeakle and Miller Houses	Yeakle and Miller Houses	January 22, 1992 (#91002009)	500 and 502 Bethlehem Pike and 9 Hillcrest Avenue, Erdenheim; 40°05′19″N 75°12′49″W	Springfield Township	

== Former listings ==
	Name on the Register	Image	Date listed	Date removed	Location	City or town	Description
1	Anselm Hall		May 8, 1974 (#74002330)	December 31, 1974	915 Spring Ave.		Ronaele Manor. Demolished in 1974.
2	Valentine Nungesser House		August 17, 1973 (#74002332)	1974	Skippack Rd.	Woxall	
3	Upper House, Episcopal Academy		February 2, 1973 (#74002335)	June 16, 1974	City Line Ave. and Berwick Rd.	Merion	Also known as Yorklynne. Demolished in 1974.

== See also ==
- List of National Historic Landmarks in Pennsylvania
- List of Pennsylvania state historical markers in Montgomery County
- National Register of Historic Places listings in Pennsylvania
