= Bridge in Upper Frederick Township =

Bridge in Upper Frederick Township may refer to:

- Bridge in Upper Frederick Township (Fagleysville, Pennsylvania)
- Bridge in Upper Frederick Township (Zieglerville, Pennsylvania)
