= Chevalier Jackson =

American physician (1865-1958)

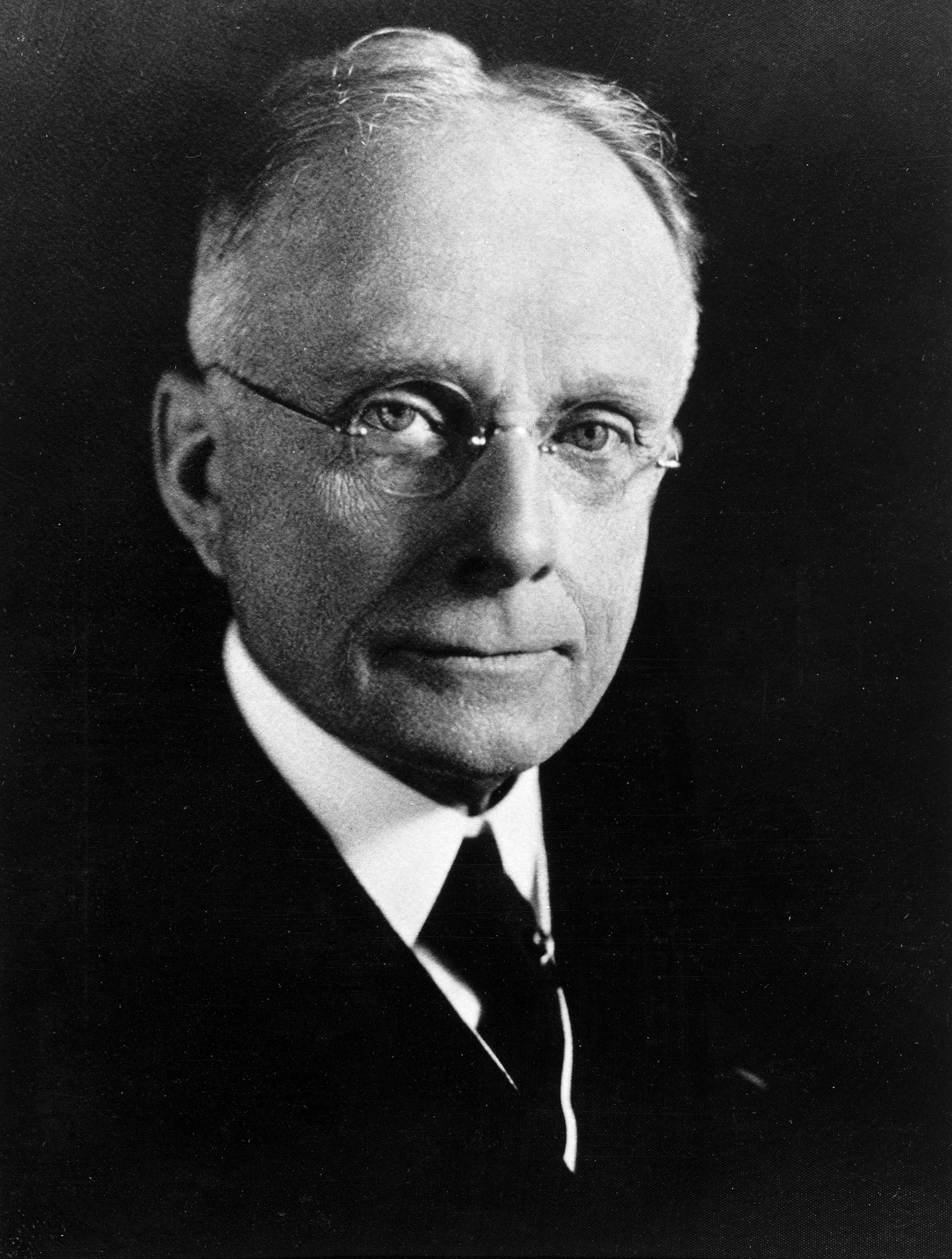
- Undated portrait of Jackson
- Born: November 4, 1865; Pittsburgh, Pennsylvania, U.S.
- Died: August 16, 1958 (aged 92); Philadelphia, Pennsylvania, U.S.
- Burial place: West Laurel Hill Cemetery, Bala Cynwyd, Pennsylvania, U.S.
- Education: Western University of Pennsylvania; Jefferson Medical College (MD)
- Known for: Advances in endoscopy and bronchoscopy
- Awards: Elliott Cresson Medal (1929)
- Scientific career
- Fields: Laryngology

Chevalier Quixote Jackson (November 4, 1865 – August 16, 1958) was an American physician and pioneer in laryngology. He developed an esophagoscope in 1890 and a bronchoscope in 1899 that were major advances in the technology. He removed over 2,300 inhaled or swallowed items non-surgically from patients. His work in endoscopy and bronchoscopy resulted in improvements in the outcome for foreign body aspiration from a 98% mortality rate to a 98% survival rate.

He used his esophagoscope for the dilation of esophageal strictures which occurred in children who accidentally ingested lye. He campaigned to have lye bottles listed as a poison which resulted in passage of the Federal Caustic Labeling Act of 1929. He was the first to identify erosive esophagitis in 1929 and he developed a standardized technique for tracheotomy that is still used today.

He was chair of laryngology at Western Pennsylvania University (now the University of Pittsburgh), professor of laryngology at Jefferson Medical College, and Fellow of the College of Physicians of Philadelphia. He held collegiate chairs at multiple medical colleges in Philadelphia including Jefferson Medical College, Temple University, University of Pennsylvania, and Woman's Medical College of Pennsylvania. He was awarded the Elliot Cresson Medal in 1929. He served as president of Woman's Medical College of Pennsylvania from 1935 to 1941.

== Early life and education ==
Jackson was born November 4, 1865, in Pittsburgh, Pennsylvania, the second of William Stanford Jackson and Katherine Ann Morage's three sons. Due to financial difficulties, the family moved to Crafton, Pennsylvania. He began woodworking at the age of 4. When he was older, he became adept at creating skates, sleds, canoes, and furniture. He earned money for college by decorating glass and pottery, selling medical textbooks, and working as a cook.

He attended school at the Western University of Pennsylvania from 1879 to 1883, and received his medical degree from Jefferson Medical College in 1886. At Jefferson, he was able to learn from the work of Charles E. de M. Sajous and others at the newly created dispensary for diseases of the nose and throat. He travelled to Europe and visited clinics in Berlin, Paris, and Vienna. He studied under Morrell Mackenzie in London which inspired him to develop a tool to examine the esophagus.

== Career ==
In 1900, he was the chair of laryngology at Western Pennsylvania University and worked on staff at fourteen different hospitals. He observed lectures given by Gustav Killian and incorporated the technique of sword swallowers where the head is tilted back to align the mouth, throat, and windpipe into a straight line. He developed an esophagoscope in 1890. He had initial success using the tool himself and made it available to other physicians. However, the untrained endoscopists had disastrous results and Jackson discontinued the distribution and sale of the esophagoscope until proper training and protocols could be put in place. He created a training program that had trainees study the anatomy of cadavers, practice removing items from a rubber hose, and then on anesthetized dogs before using the tool on humans.

He developed a bronchoscope in 1899 that was a thin-walled brass tube with a small electric light at the end. It was not the first bronchoscope developed, but was a major advancement. Small forceps and hooks were inserted into the tube to remove foreign objects swallowed by patients. The idea to add a light at the end of the bronchoscope was made by Max Einhorn. Despite claims that this was the first usage of a "distally illuminated tube", Maximilian Nitze was the first to use a light placed distally on a medical device.

In 1916, he moved to Philadelphia and accepted a professorship of laryngology role at Jefferson Medical College. He suffered repeated bouts of tuberculosis and spent his recovery time at his home, named Sunrise Mill, writing and designing and producing medical instrument prototypes in a workshop on his property.

Over the course of his career, he removed over 2,300 inhaled or swallowed items from patients non-surgically. These items included coins, needles, jewelry, seeds, buttons, utensils, toys, and many other things. He kept many of those items in his clinic on display as an informal museum. His work in endoscopy and bronchoscopy resulted in improvements in the outcome for foreign body aspiration from a 98% mortality rate to a 98% survival rate.

He was the first to identify erosive esophagitis in 1929 and he developed a standardized technique for tracheotomy that is still used today. He used his esophagoscope for the dilation of esophageal strictures which often occurred in children who accidentally ingested lye. He never patented his medical instruments and did not benefit financially from their use. He believed the devices should be free for all physicians to use after they had completed necessary safety training.

Jackson authored 238 solo authored and 473 co-authored scientific articles, six monographs, and twelve textbooks. In 1938, he published his autobiography "The Life of Chevalier Jackson" which became a bestseller. He was a Fellow of the College of Physicians of Philadelphia. He held collegiate chairs at multiple medical colleges in Philadelphia including Jefferson Medical College, Temple University, University of Pennsylvania, and Woman's Medical College of Pennsylvania. He served as president of Woman's Medical College of Pennsylvania from 1935 to 1941.

Jackson campaigned to have lye bottles labeled as a poison which resulted in passage of the Federal Caustic Labeling Act in 1927. He was elected to the American Philosophical Society in 1919 and was awarded the Franklin Institute's Elliott Cresson Medal in 1929.

== Personal life ==
He married Alice Bennett White in 1899 and together they had a son, Chevalier Lawrence Jackson, who became a surgeon. His son succeeded him as chair at Temple University in 1938.

== Death and legacy ==
He died August 16, 1958, in Philadelphia, and was interred at West Laurel Hill Cemetery in Bala Cynwyd, Pennsylvania.

His collection of over 2,300 objects that were inhaled or swallowed by patients and removed non-surgically by Jackson are on permanent display at the Mütter Museum in Philadelphia. A collection of his papers is held at the United States National Library of Medicine. His home, Sunrise Mill, was added to the National Register of Historic Places in 1977.
