= Obelisk, Pennsylvania =

Unincorporated community in Pennsylvania, US

- Unincorporated community
- Location within Pennsylvania
- Coordinates: 40°17′17″N 75°30′41″W
- Country: United States
- State: Pennsylvania
- County: Montgomery
- Township: Upper Frederick
- Elevation: 335 ft (102 m)
- Time zone: UTC-5 (Eastern (EST))
  - Summer (DST): UTC-4 (EDT)
- ZIP Code: 19492
- Area codes: 610 and 484
- GNIS feature ID: 1204319

Obelisk is an unincorporated community in Upper Frederick Township and Lower Frederick Township in Montgomery County, Pennsylvania, United States. Obelisk is located at the intersection of Pennsylvania Route 73 and Faust Road.

== Etymology ==
According to tradition, the community was so named from image of an obelisk in the logo of paper collars sold in the area.
