= Washington Hose and Steam Fire Engine Company, No. 1 =

- U.S. National Register of Historic Places
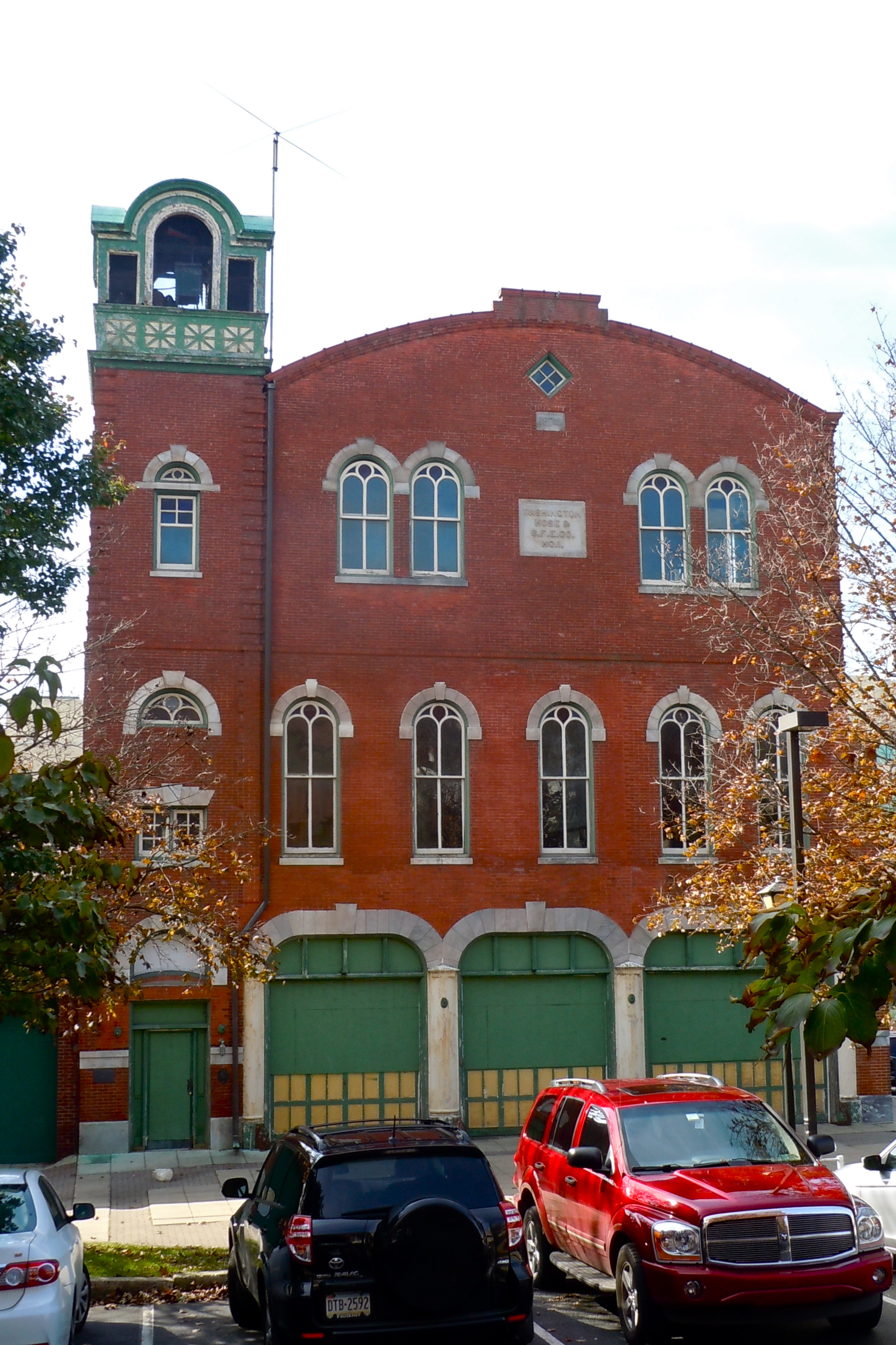
- Washington Hose and Steam Fire Engine Company, No. 1. November 2011.

- Location within Pennsylvania Location within the United States
- Location: 15 W. Hector St., Conshohocken, Pennsylvania
- Coordinates: 40°4′24″N 75°18′28″W
- Area: 0.7 acres (0.28 ha)
- Built: 1877
- Architectural style: Italianate
- NRHP reference No.: 75001655
- Added to NRHP: November 20, 1975

The Washington Hose and Steam Fire Engine Company, No. 1 is located in Conshohocken, Pennsylvania. The building was built in 1877 and was added to the National Register of Historic Places on November 20, 1975.

== See also ==
- National Register of Historic Places listings in Montgomery County, Pennsylvania
