= Unionville, Montgomery County, Pennsylvania =

Community in Pennsylvania, U.S.

Coordinates: 40°17′54″N 75°16′59″W

Unionville is a suburban community in the Philadelphia metropolitan area located on Pennsylvania Route 309. It is primarily in Hatfield Township, Montgomery County, but also extends into Hilltown Township, Bucks County, Pennsylvania, United States.

Route 309 (Bethlehem Pike) follows the county line between the beginning of the expressway and Line Lexington. Montgomery County students are served by North Penn School District, while Bucks County students are served by Pennridge School District. It is drained by the West Branch Neshaminy Creek, a tributary of the Neshaminy Creek. It is served by the Hatfield post office, which uses the ZIP code 19440. Dock Meadows has a Mennonite-affiliated retirement community in the Bucks County portion of Unionville.
