= Sunrise Mill =

- U.S. National Register of Historic Places
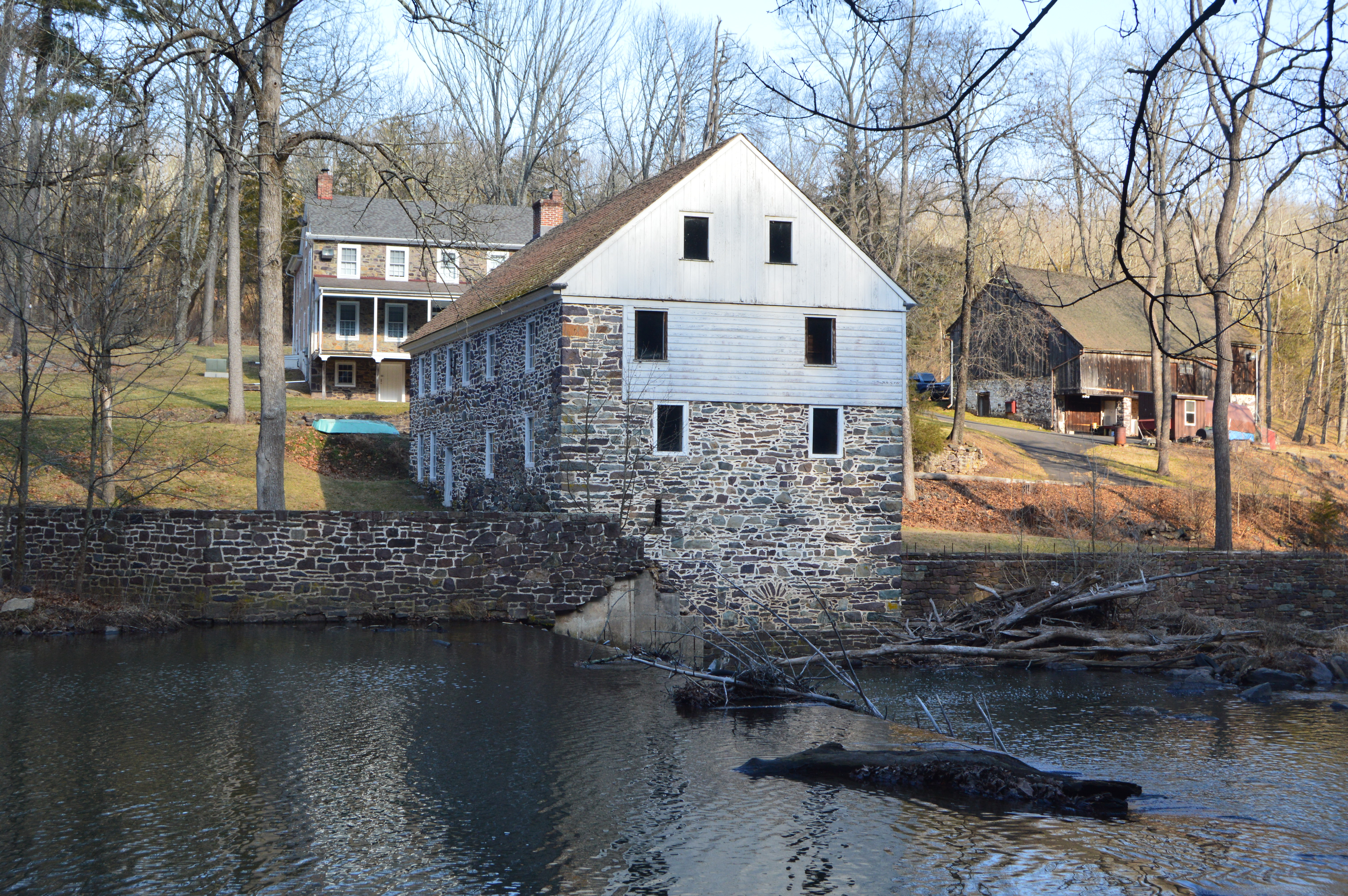
- Sunrise Mill.

- Location within Pennsylvania Location within the United States
- Nearest city: 3 miles (4.8 km) west of Schwenksville on Neiffer Road, Upper Frederick Township, Pennsylvania
- Coordinates: 40°16′24″N 75°31′13″W
- Area: 8.5 acres (3.4 ha)
- Built: 1795, c. 1835
- Architectural style: Swiss bank barn
- NRHP reference No.: 77001177
- Added to NRHP: April 11, 1977

The Sunrise Mill is an historic grist mill complex that is located near Schwenksville in Upper Frederick Township, Montgomery County, Pennsylvania in the United States.

== History and architectural features ==
This complex includes a grist mill with an attached saw mill. Built circa 1767, it was enlarged in 1819. The complex also includes a farmhouse that was built circa 1828 and a Swiss bank barn that was erected in 1795.

The grist mill originally operated using an internal waterwheel system that ran off the adjacent Swamp Creek, before converting to turbine power after 1870. The property also includes a mill dam that was reconstructed in 1891, a mill race, and a stone arch bridge that was built circa 1845.

The property was later owned by Dr. Chevalier Jackson (1865-1958), an internationally known physician and specialist in laryngology, who lived at Sunrise from 1919 until his death in 1958. Dr. Jackson established a workspace inside the grist mill where, using power generated by the mill to run a lathe, he invented, more than two hundred different medical instruments for use in laryngeal surgery. Dr. Jackson also kept an art studio in the grist mill, where he painted nature scenes of the surrounding area.

In 1977, the Sunrise Mill complex was added to the National Register of Historic Places.

The site is now owned and operated by the Montgomery County Division of Parks, Trails, and Historic Sites. It is currently undergoing a restoration project in order to be opened to the public as a history site.
