= Grubb Mansion =

Historic house in Pennsylvania, United States

- U.S. National Register of Historic Places
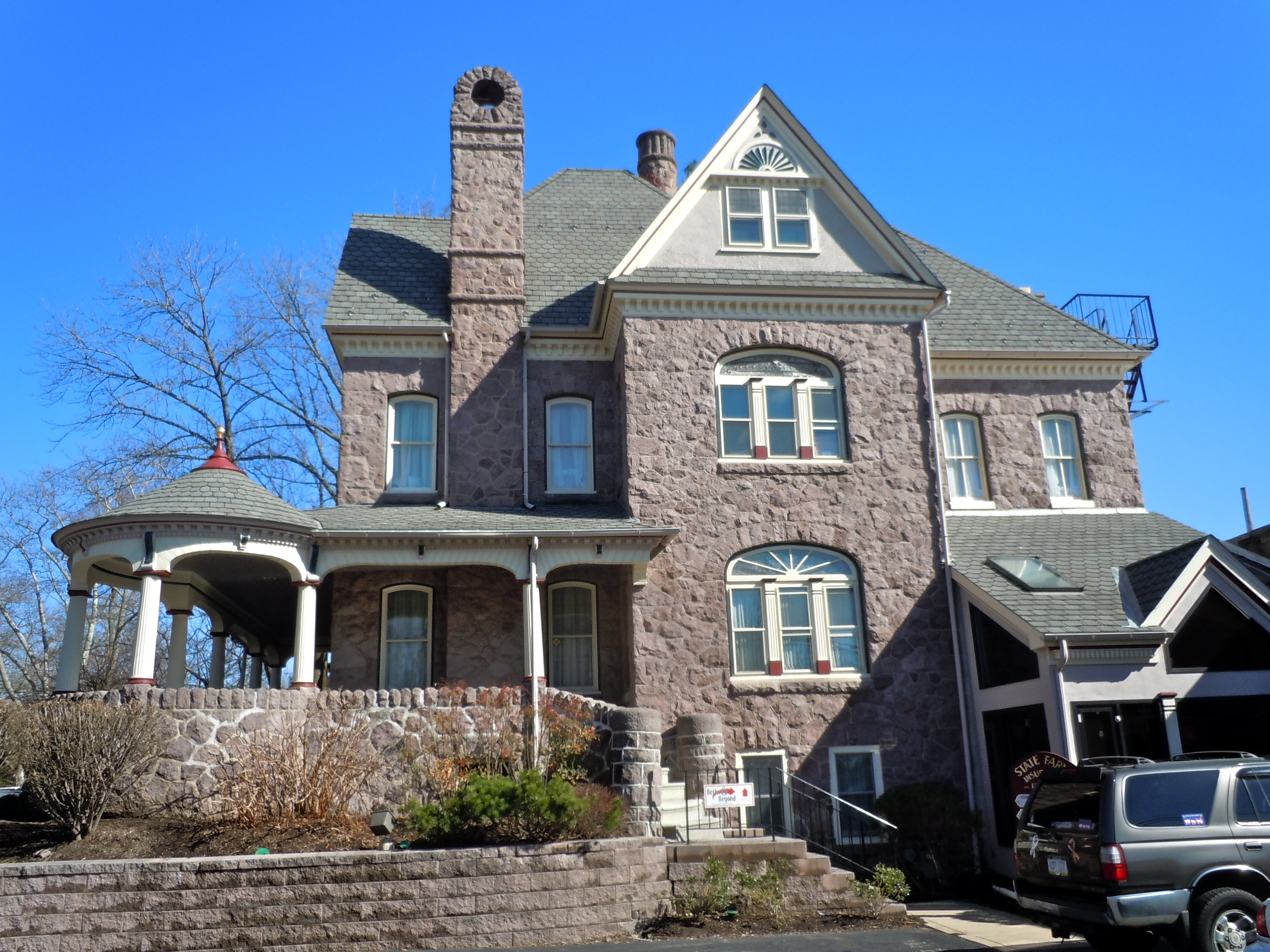
- Grubb Mansion, March 2011

- Location within Pennsylvania Location within the United States
- Location: 1304 High St., Pottstown, Pennsylvania
- Coordinates: 40°14′30″N 75°37′17″W
- Area: 0.3 acres (0.12 ha)
- Built: 1906
- Architectural style: Queen Anne
- NRHP reference No.: 91000505
- Added to NRHP: May 1, 1991

Grubb Mansion is an historic home which is located in the High Street Historic District, in Pottstown, Montgomery County, Pennsylvania.

It was added to the National Register of Historic Places in 2003.

== History and architectural features ==
Built in 1906, Grubb Mansion is a three-story, asymmetrical, brownstone building, which was designed in the Queen Anne style. Located in Pottstown's High Street Historic District, it features a nine-foot-deep front porch with an open turret, art glass windows and an octagonal tower.

The dwelling was converted to office use in 1954 and a union hall was added to the rear in 1956.
