= High Street Historic District (Pottstown, Pennsylvania) =

Historic district in Pennsylvania, United States

- U.S. National Register of Historic Places
- U.S. Historic district
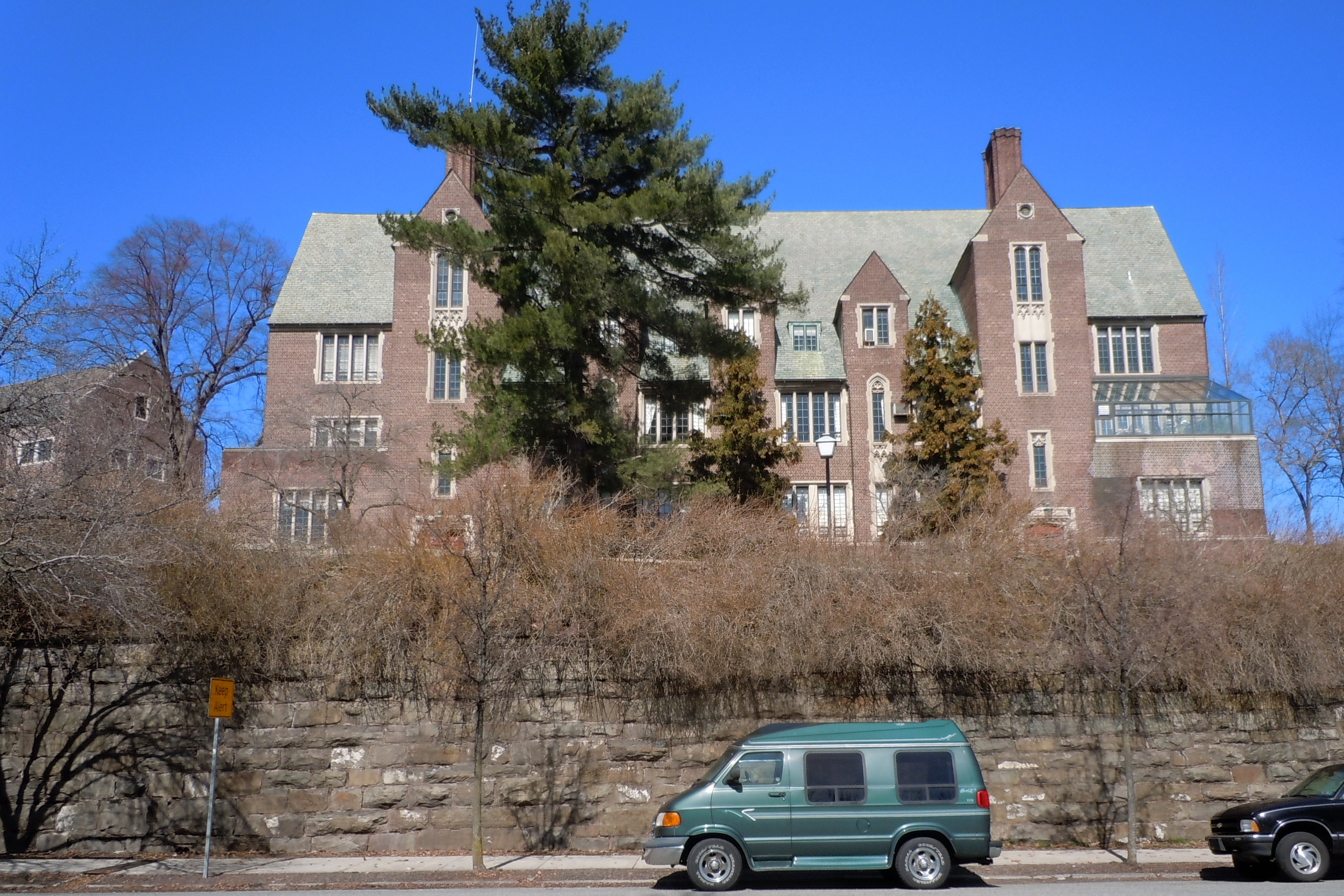
- Hill School, High Street Historic District, March 2011

- Location within Pennsylvania Location within the United States
- Location: 631–1329 High St., Pottstown, Pennsylvania
- Coordinates: 40°14′34″N 75°37′46″W
- Area: 37.2 acres (15.1 ha)
- Architectural style: Late 19th And 20th Century Revivals, Queen Anne, American Four Square
- NRHP reference No.: 91001756
- Added to NRHP: January 28, 1992

The High Street Historic District is a national historic district which is located in Pottstown, Montgomery County, Pennsylvania.

It was added to the National Register of Historic Places in 1992.

== History and architectural features ==
The High Street Historic District encompasses one hundred and twenty-four contributing buildings and one contributing structure in an upper- and middle-level residential section of Pottstown. This district includes late-19th and early-20th century mansions and stylish homes that were built between 1860 and 1941. These structures were designed in a variety of popular architectural styles including Queen Anne, American Foursquare, Victorian Gothic, Late Federal and Italianate. Notable non-residential buildings include a gas station, which was erected sometime around 1928, St. John's Reformed Church, which was built in 1916, St. James Evangelical Lutheran Church, which was also built sometime around 1916, and the Pottstown Memorial Hospital, which was erected circa 1938. This district also includes the separately listed Grubb Mansion.
