= Oak Park Historic District =

Historic district in Pennsylvania, United States

- U.S. National Register of Historic Places
- U.S. Historic district
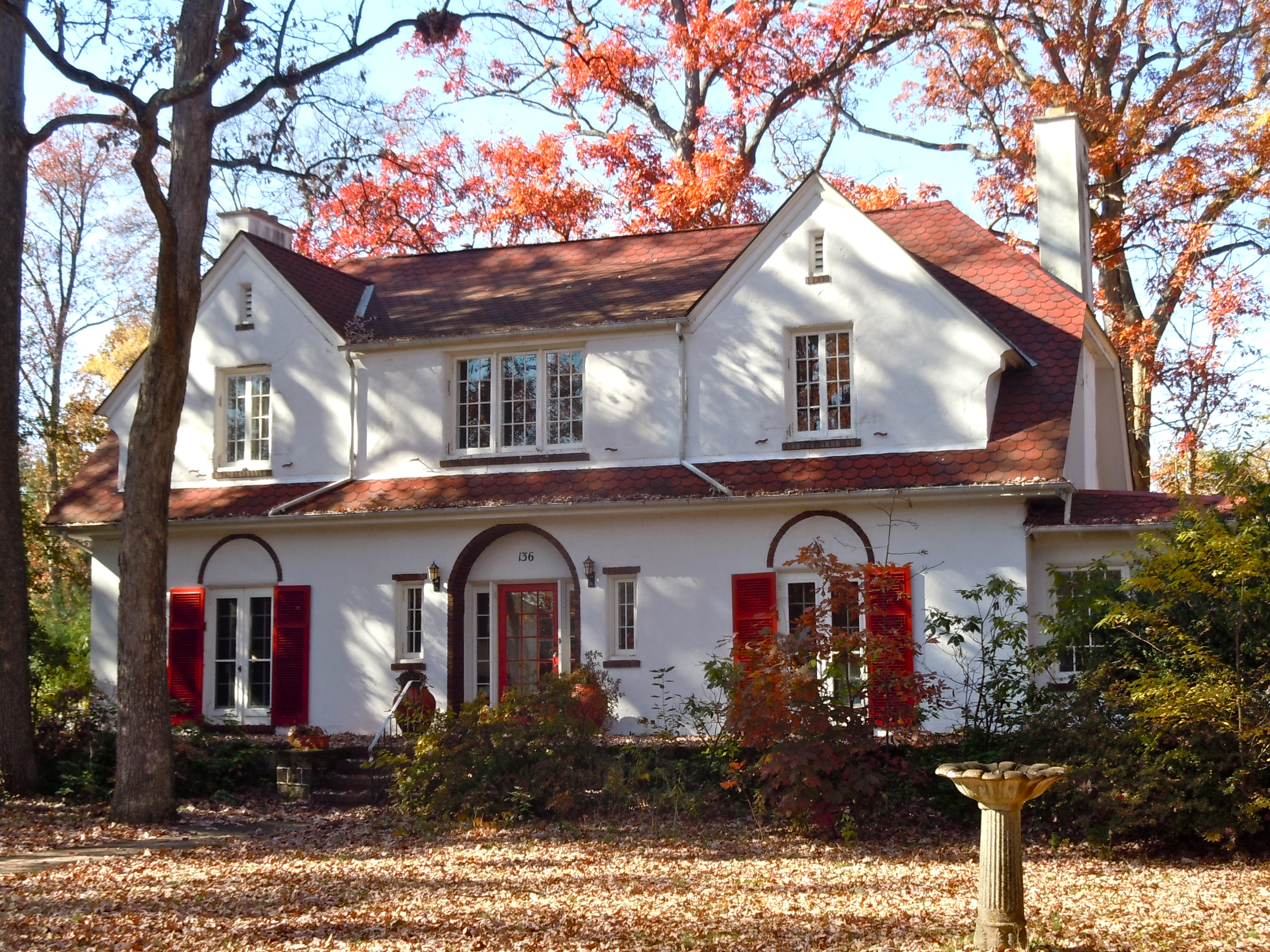
- Home in the Oak Park Historic District, November 2011

- Location within Pennsylvania Location within the United States
- Location: Roughly along Oak Park Rd., Park Ave., Oak Blvd., Forest Ave., and Squirrel Ln., Hatfield Township, Pennsylvania
- Coordinates: 40°15′11″N 75°17′57″W
- Area: 17.7 acres (7.2 ha)
- Built: 1912
- Architect: Harry Richardson
- Architectural style: Late 19th And 20th Century Revivals, Late 19th And Early 20th Century American Movements, Four square
- NRHP reference No.: 98000897
- Added to NRHP: July 23, 1998

The Oak Park Historic District is a national historic district that is located in Hatfield Township, Montgomery County, Pennsylvania.

It was added to the National Register of Historic Places in 1998.

== History and architectural features ==
This district encompasses thirty-three contributing buildings and one contributing structure that date from 1912 to the 1980s. The residences, which are located in a planned residential neighborhood, reflect a variety of popular late nineteenth- and twentieth-century architectural styles, including Bungalow/American Craftsman, cottage revival, and Colonial Revival. The contributing structure is the entry gate to the suburban development.
