= Conrad Grubb Homestead =

Historic house in Pennsylvania, United States

- U.S. National Register of Historic Places
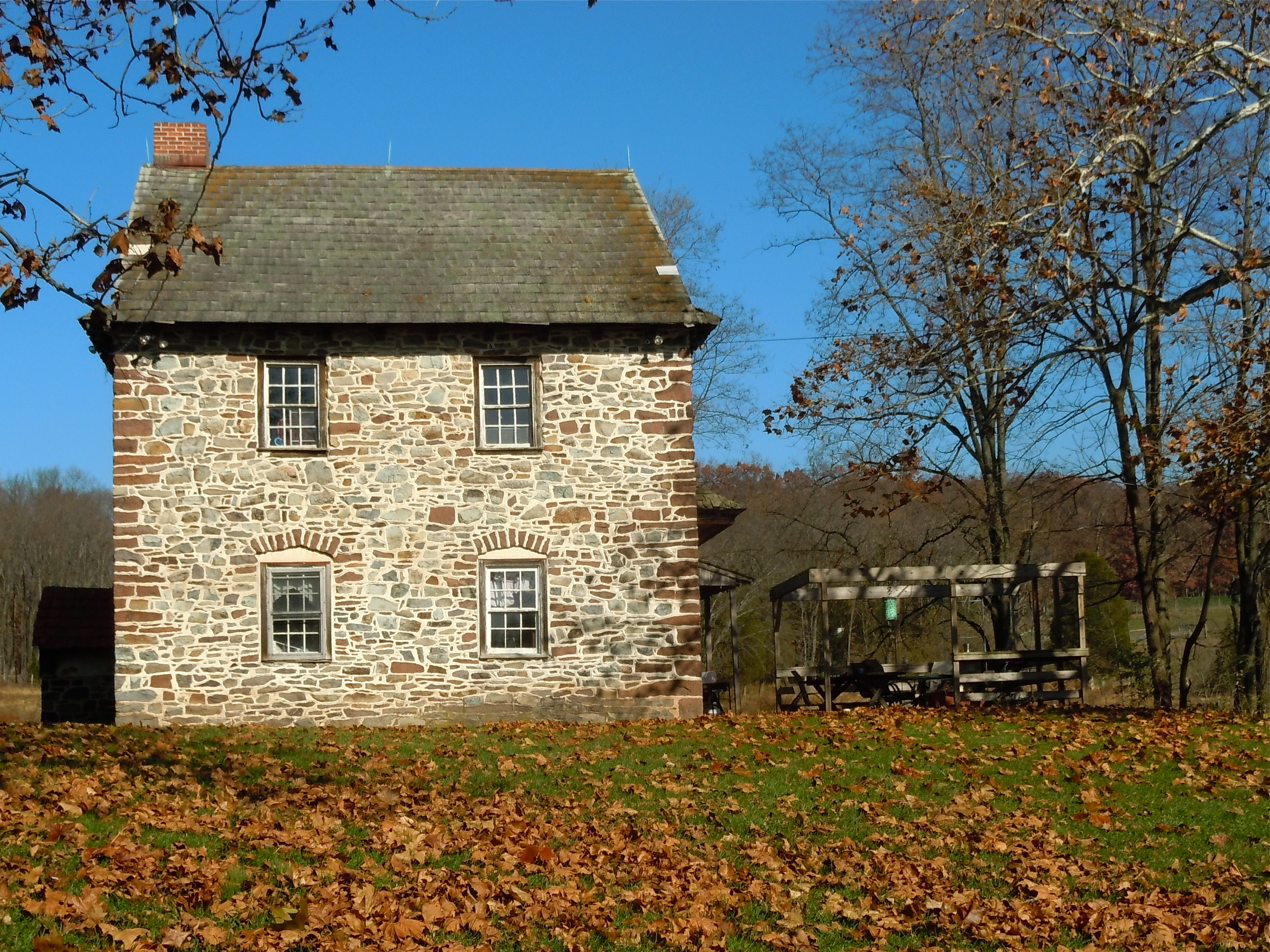
- Conrad Grubb Homestead, November 2011

- Location within Pennsylvania Location within the United States
- Location: Northwest of Schwenksville off Pennsylvania Route 73 on Perkiomenville Road, Upper Frederick Township, Pennsylvania
- Coordinates: 40°18′10″N 75°30′49″W
- Area: 100 acres (40 ha)
- Built: 1754
- Architectural style: Germanic house
- NRHP reference No.: 73001651
- Added to NRHP: June 19, 1973

Conrad Grubb Homestead is a historic home located near Schwenksville, Upper Frederick Township, Montgomery County, Pennsylvania. It was built in 1754, and is a 2 1/2-story Germanic style dwelling. It is built of red and gray shale and sandstone.

It was added to the National Register of Historic Places in 1973.
