= John Englehardt Homestead =

Historic house in Pennsylvania, United States

- U.S. National Register of Historic Places
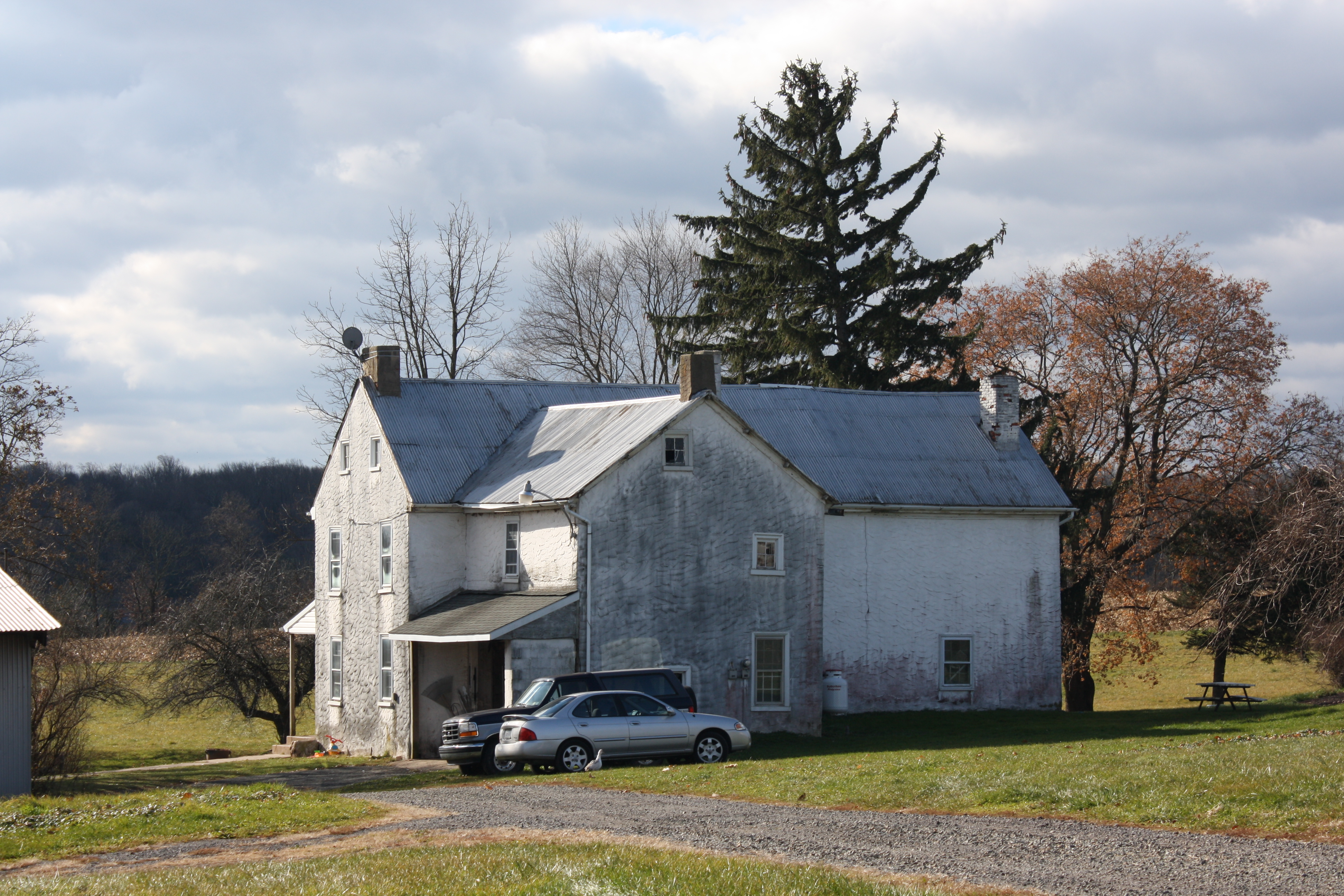
- John Englehardt Homestead. November 2012.

- Location within Pennsylvania Location within the United States
- Location: West of Schwenksville off Pennsylvania Route 73 on Keyser Road, Upper Frederick Township, Pennsylvania
- Coordinates: 40°16′57″N 75°31′54″W
- Area: 80 acres (32 ha)
- Built: c. 1725, 1800, 1850
- Architectural style: Germanic style, Late Georgian
- NRHP reference No.: 73001650
- Added to NRHP: June 4, 1973

The John Englehardt Homestead is an historic home that is located in Upper Frederick Township, Montgomery County, Pennsylvania, United States.

It was listed on the National Register of Historic Places in 1973.

== History and architectural features ==
Built in three sections between 1725 and roughly 1850, this historic structure was added to the National Register of Historic Places in 1973.

The oldest part is a 2 1/2-story, stone dwelling, with a two-bay Germanic style front facade. A 2 1/2-story, Georgian-style, five-bay-wide, stone section was added circa 1800. The third section was built in the mid-nineteenth century, and is a 2 1/2-story, frame structure. Also located on the property is a contributing Swiss bank barn.

== Gallery ==
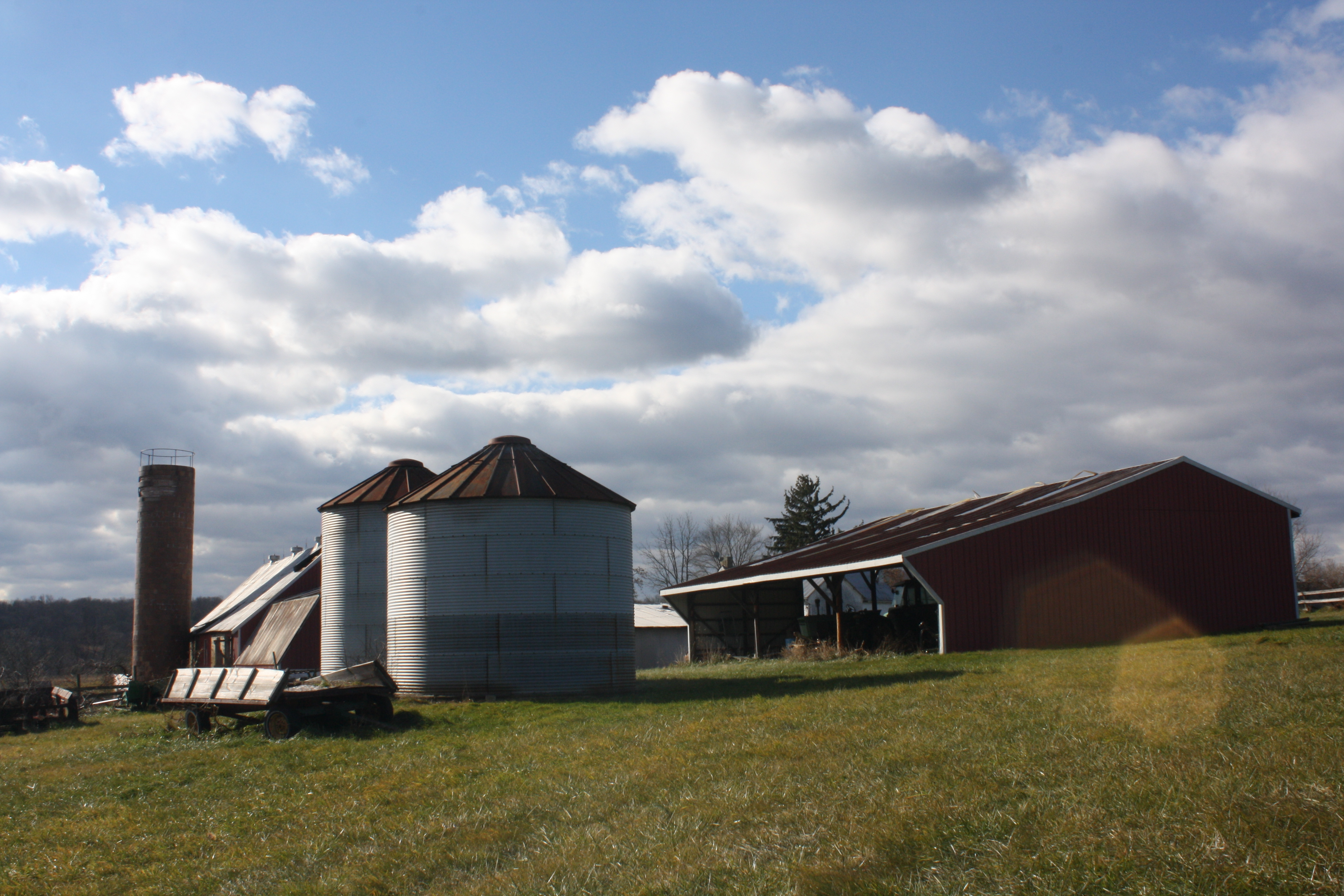
General view of the John Englehardt Farm
