= Central Norristown Historic District =

Historic district in Pennsylvania, United States

- U.S. National Register of Historic Places
- U.S. Historic district
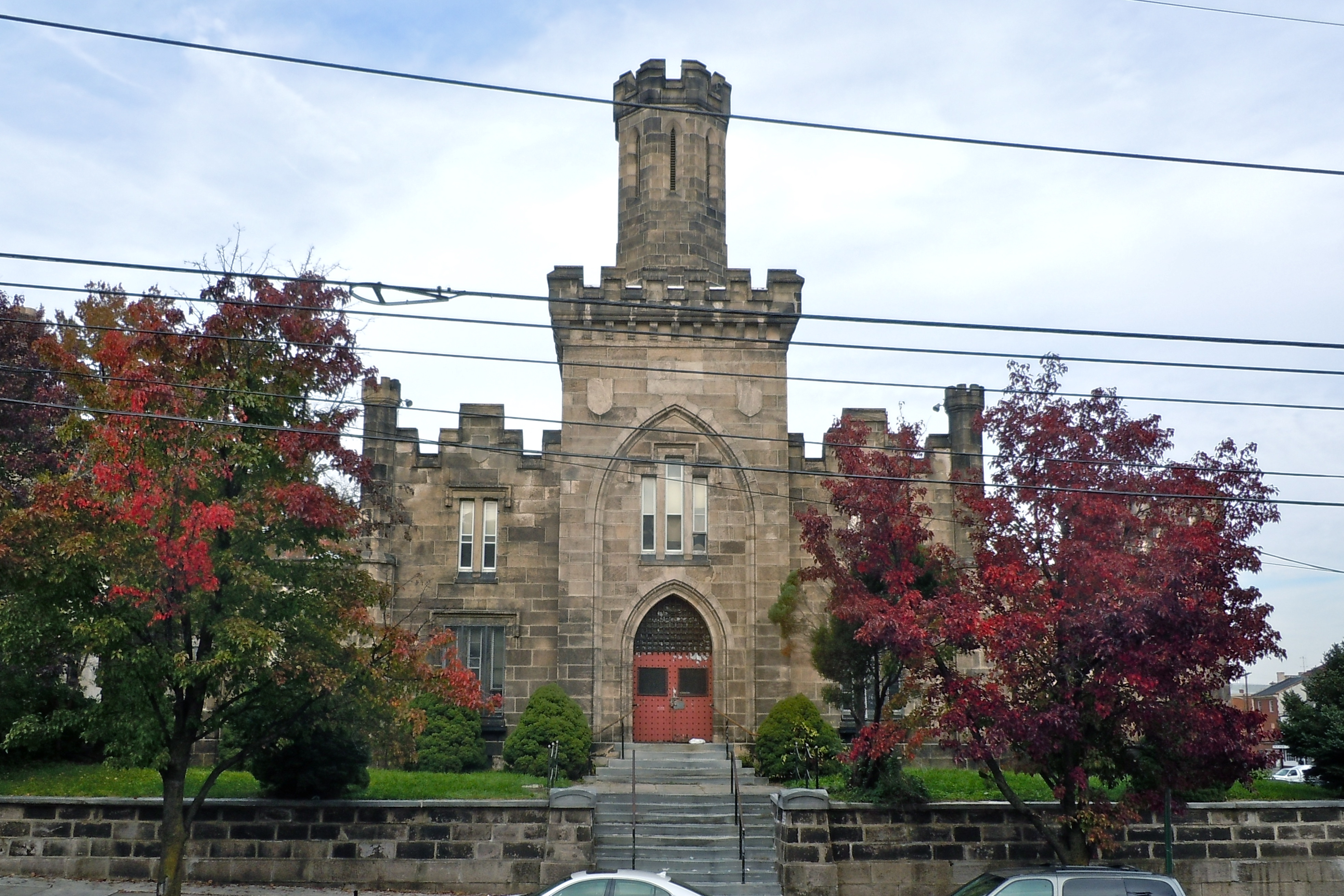
- Central Norristown Historic District, November 2011

- Location within Pennsylvania Location within the United States
- Location: Roughly bounded by Stoney Creek, Walnut, Lafayette, and Fornace Sts., Norristown, Pennsylvania
- Coordinates: 40°07′04″N 75°20′22″W
- Area: 245 acres (99 ha)
- Built: 1800
- Architectural style: Greek Revival, Italianate, Victorian
- NRHP reference No.: 84000321
- Added to NRHP: November 23, 1984

Central Norristown Historic District is a national historic district located in Norristown, Montgomery County, Pennsylvania. It encompasses approximately 1,900 buildings in the central business district and surrounding residential areas of Norristown. Notable buildings include the Montgomery County Courthouse, Philadelphia and Western Railroad Station (1931), Scheidt Brewery, Montgomery County Jail, Y.M.C.A, Odd Fellows Hall, and a variety of workers' housing and imposing dwellings.

It was added to the National Register of Historic Places in 1984.
