= Globe Knitting Mills =

Former mill in Norristown, Pennsylvania

- U.S. National Register of Historic Places
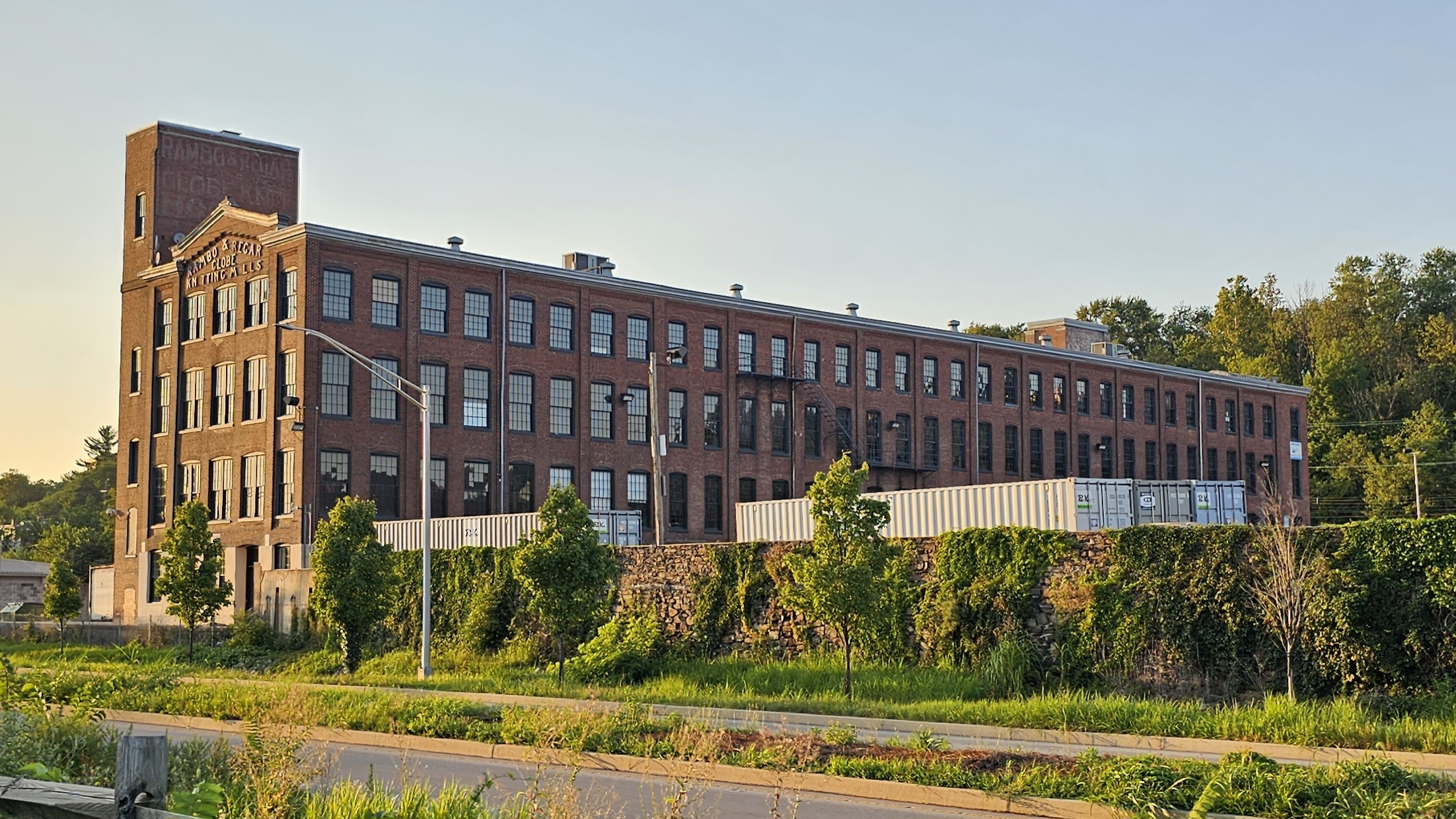
- The mills in 2023

- Location within Pennsylvania Location within the United States
- Location: 660 and 694 E. Main St., Norristown, Pennsylvania
- Coordinates: 40°6′40″N 75°19′54″W
- Area: less than one acre
- Built: 1898
- Architect: Hales & Ballinger
- Architectural style: Italianate
- NRHP reference No.: 02001745
- Added to NRHP: January 31, 2003

Globe Knitting Mills, also known as the Rambo & Regar Globe Knitting Mills, are two historic textile mill buildings located at Norristown, Montgomery County, Pennsylvania. They were built in 1898, and were referred to as the "Main (Knitting) Building" and the "Oxidizing Building / Dye House." They are constructed of red brick with heavy timber framing and Italianate style design elements. The main building is three stories tall and rectangular in plan.

It was added to the National Register of Historic Places in 2003.
