= Hatfield Township, Pennsylvania =

Township in Pennsylvania, US

Hatfield Township
- Township
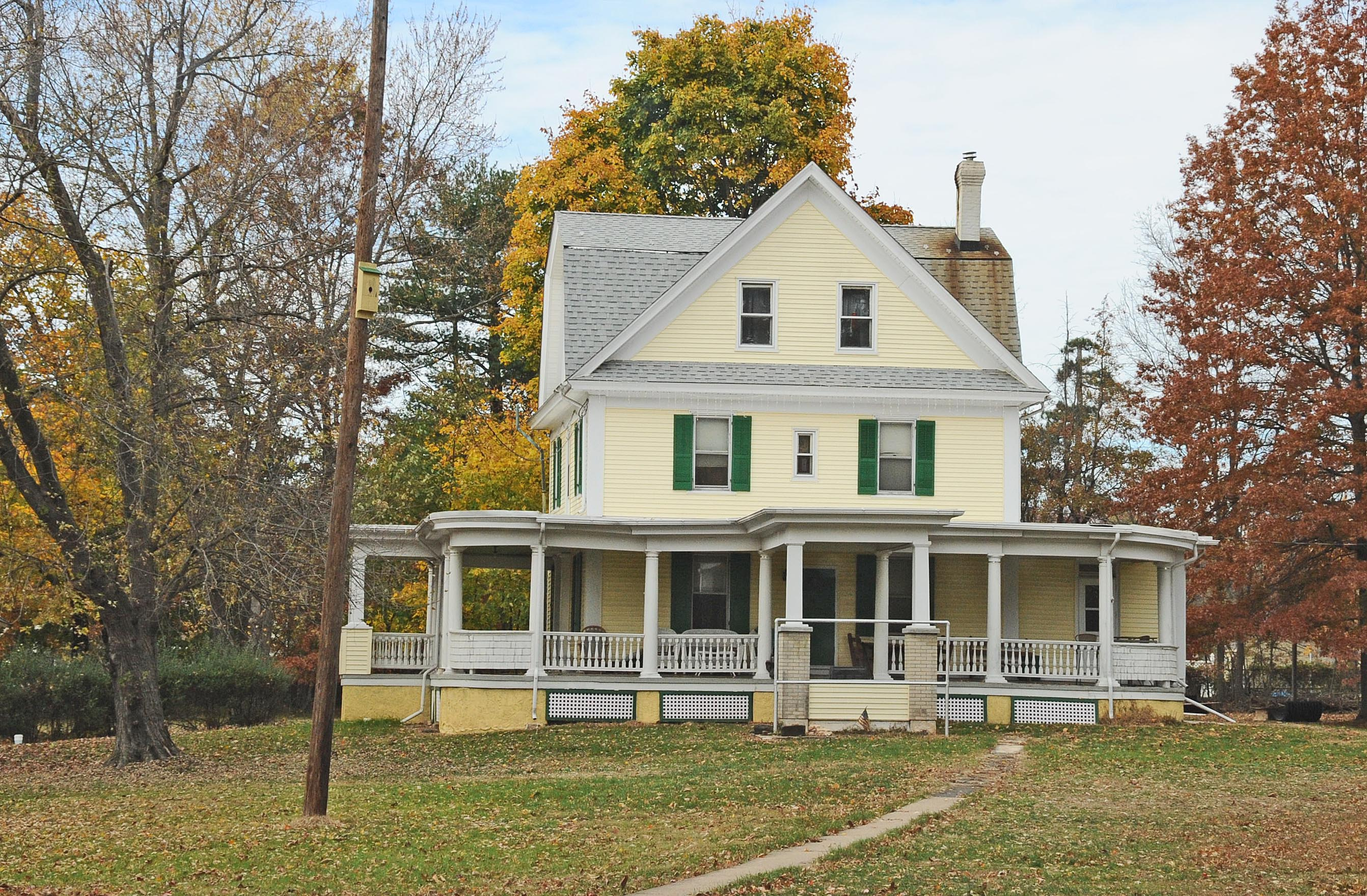
- Walter and Gertrude May Stewart Homestead

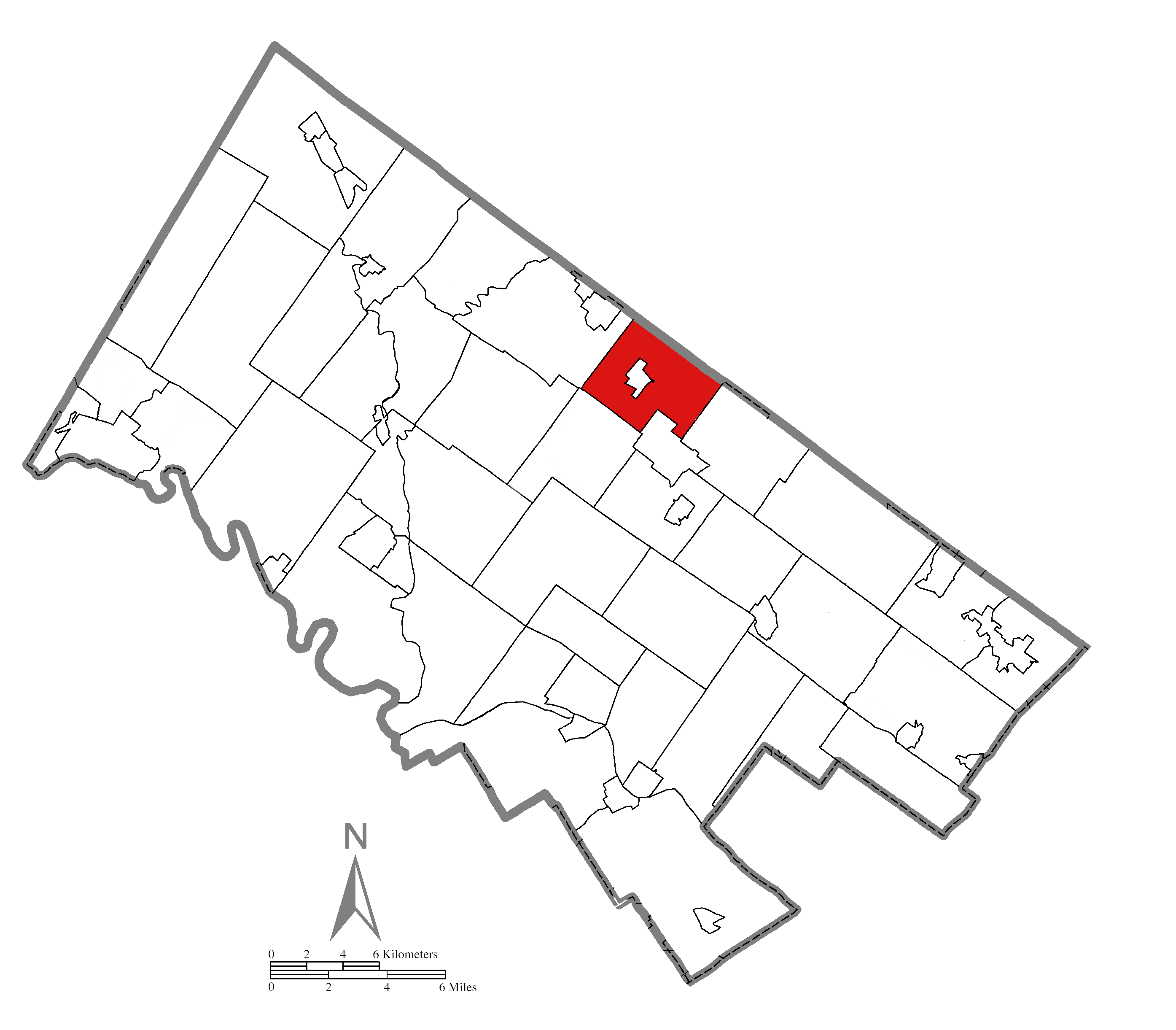
- Location of Pennsylvania in the United States
- Coordinates: 40°16′38″N 75°15′37″W
- Country: United States
- State: Pennsylvania
- County: Montgomery

Area
  - Total: 9.94 sq mi (25.7 km^{2})
  - Land: 9.94 sq mi (25.7 km^{2})
  - Water: 0.00 sq mi (0 km^{2})
- Elevation: 305 ft (93 m)

Population (2020)
  - Total: 18,640
  - Estimate (2025): 20,904 ▲
  - Density: 1,880/sq mi (724/km^{2})
- Time zone: UTC-5 (EST)
  - Summer (DST): UTC-4 (EDT)
- Area codes: 215, 267 and 445
- FIPS code: 42-091-33120
- Website: www.hatfieldtownship.org

Hatfield Township is a township in Montgomery County, Pennsylvania, United States. The population was 18,640 at the 2020 census and estimated to be 20,904 in 2025. It is part of the North Penn Valley region which is centered around the borough of Lansdale.

== History ==
The Bridge in Hatfield Township and Oak Park Historic District are listed on the National Register of Historic Places.

== Geography ==
According to the U.S. Census Bureau, the township has a total area of 10.0 square miles (26 km^{2}), all land. It is in the Delaware watershed and is drained mainly by the West Branch Neshaminy Creek. Hatfield Township's villages include Colmar (also in Montgomery Township,) Fortuna (also in Montgomery Township,) Line Lexington (also in Bucks County,) Oak Park (also in Towamencin Township,) Orvilla, Trewigtown, and Unionville (also in Bucks County).

=== Neighboring municipalities ===
- Montgomery Township (southeast)
- Lansdale (south)
- Towamencin Township (southwest)
- Franconia Township (northwest)
- Hilltown Township, Bucks County (north)
- New Britain Township, Bucks County (northeast)

Hatfield Township surrounds the borough of Hatfield.

== Government and politics ==
Presidential elections results
Year	Republican	Democratic
2020	43.5% 4,512	54.9% 5,686
2016	44.2% 3,864	50.8% 4,441
2012	46.8% 3,723	51.8% 4,121
2008	43.7% 3,588	55.1% 4,252
2004	51.3% 3,949	48.3% 3,720
2000	52.4% 3,226	44.5% 2,740
1996	46.4% 2,517	41.2% 2,235
1992	42.7% 2,470	34.9% 2,023

=== Commissioners ===
Hatfield Township elects five commissioners by ward.

- Ward I: Jen LoStracco
- Ward II: Bob Rodgers, Vice President
- Ward III: Shahidul Partha
- Ward IV: Tom Zipfel, President
- Ward V: Gerald Andris

== Demographics ==
Historical population
Census	Pop.	Note	%±
1930	1,828		—
1940	2,264		23.9%
1950	3,101		37.0%
1960	5,759		85.7%
1970	8,613		49.6%
1980	13,411		55.7%
1990	15,357		14.5%
2000	16,712		8.8%
2010	17,249		3.2%
2020	18,640		8.1%
2025 (est.)	20,904		12.1%

As of the 2010 census, the township was 75.6% White, 4.5% Black or African American, 0.2% Native American, 16.3% Asian, 0.1% Native Hawaiian, and 2.1% were two or more races. 3.8% of the population were of Hispanic or Latino ancestry.

As of the census of 2000, there were 16,712 people, 6,302 households, and 4,449 families residing in the township. The population density was 1,677.6 inhabitants per square mile (647.7/km^{2}). There were 6,592 housing units at an average density of 661.7 per square mile (255.5/km^{2}). The racial makeup of the township was 82.93% White, 3.65% African American, 0.14% Native American, 10.38% Asian, 0.04% Pacific Islander, 0.99% from other races, and 1.87% from two or more races. Hispanic or Latino of any race were 2.39% of the population.

There were 6,302 households, out of which 33.8% had children under the age of 18 living with them, 59.9% were married couples living together, 7.2% had a female householder with no husband present, and 29.4% were non-families. 24.2% of all households were made up of individuals, and 7.6% had someone living alone who was 65 years of age or older. The average household size was 2.63 and the average family size was 3.17.

In the township the population was spread out, with 25.1% under the age of 18, 7.9% from 18 to 24, 32.2% from 25 to 44, 23.6% from 45 to 64, and 11.1% who were 65 years of age or older. The median age was 37 years. For every 100 females there were 100.8 males. For every 100 females age 18 and over, there were 97.5 males.

The median income for a household in the township was $57,247, and the median income for a family was $68,409. Males had a median income of $45,596 versus $30,439 for females. The per capita income for the township was $25,051. About 2.5% of families and 3.9% of the population were below the poverty line, including 4.5% of those under age 18 and 1.8% of those age 65 or over.

== Transportation ==
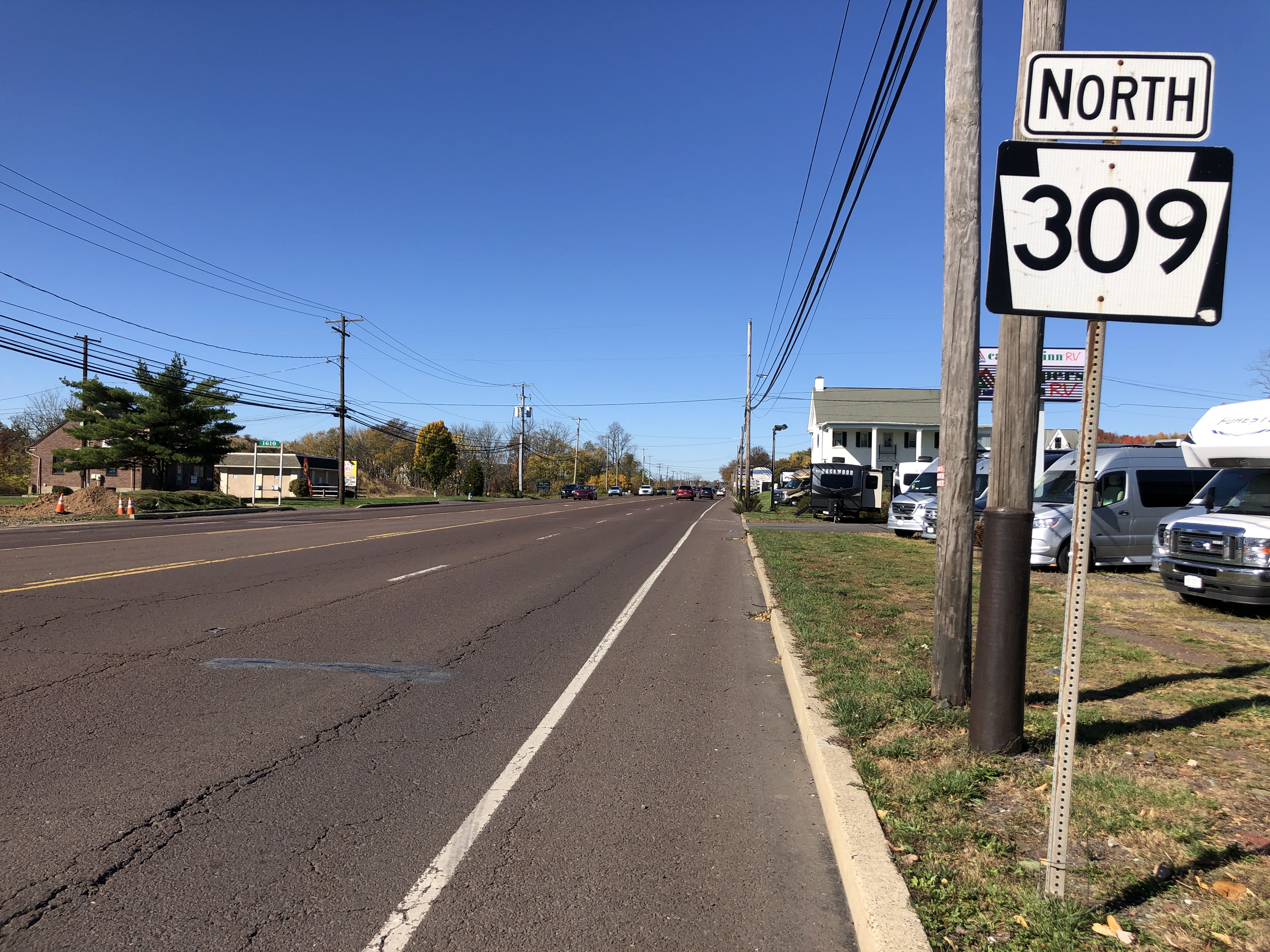
PA 309 northbound along the northeastern border of Hatfield Township

As of 2021 there were 73.44 miles (118.19 km) of public roads in Hatfield Township, of which 13.31 miles (21.42 km) were maintained by the Pennsylvania Department of Transportation (PennDOT) and 60.13 miles (96.77 km) were maintained by the township.

Three state highways traverse Hatfield Township. Pennsylvania Route 309 follows Bethlehem Pike across the northeastern portion of the township. Pennsylvania Route 63 follows Welsh Road along the southwestern edge of the township. Finally, Pennsylvania Route 463 follows Forty Foot Road and Cowpath Road across central portions of the township.

SEPTA Regional Rail's Lansdale/Doylestown Line runs through the southeastern portion of Hatfield Township, with stations at Fortuna, Colmar, and Link Belt. SEPTA provides Suburban Bus service to Hatfield Township along Route 132, which runs between the Montgomery Mall and Telford.

== Education ==
North Penn School District operates public schools Hatfield Elementary, A.M. Kulp Elementary, and Pennfield Middle School.

St. Maria Goretti School, a Catholic school of the Roman Catholic Archdiocese of Philadelphia, closed in 2012.
