= Bridge in Hatfield Township =

- U.S. National Register of Historic Places
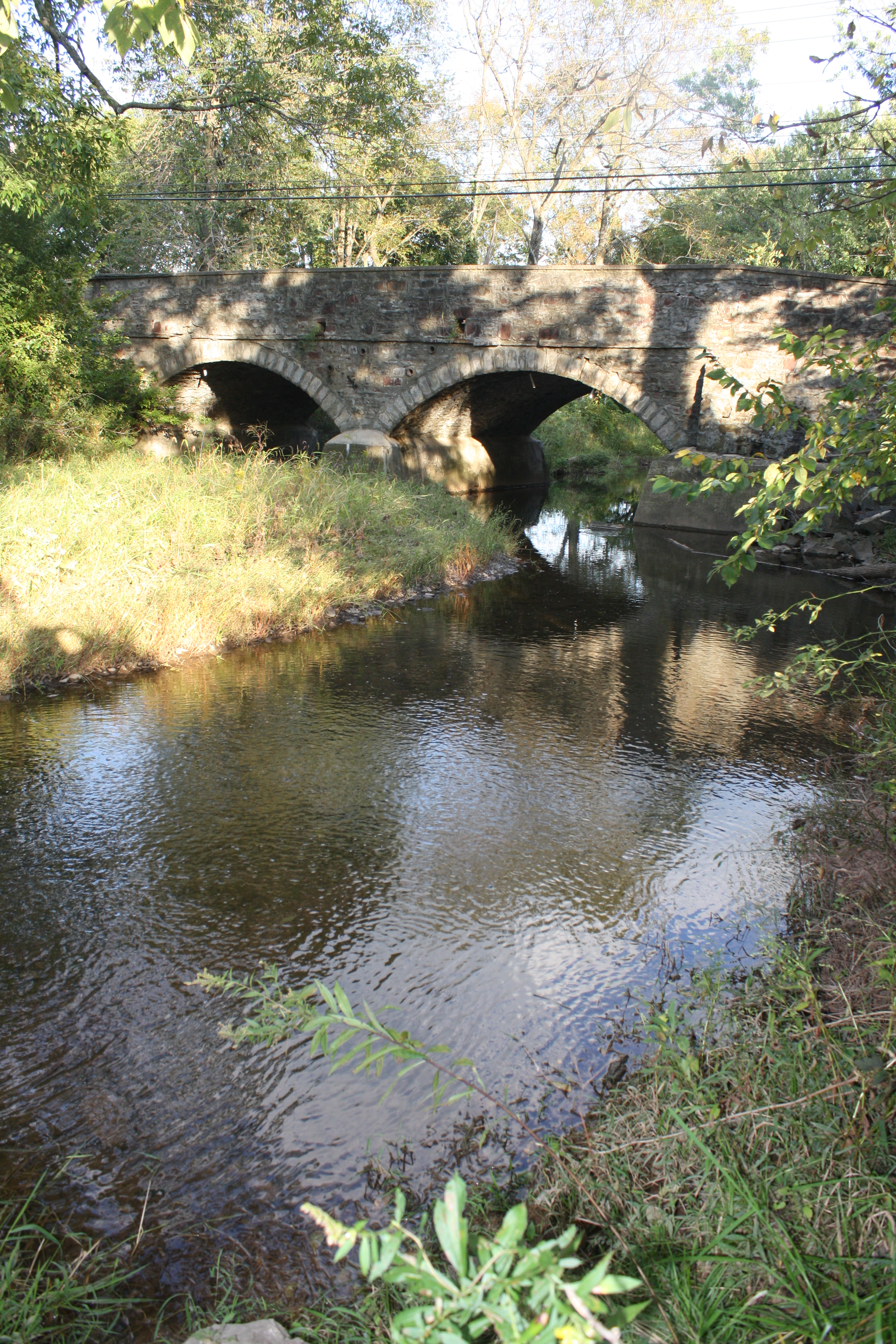
- Bridge in Hatfield Township. September 2012.

- Location within Pennsylvania Location within the United States
- Location: Orvilla Road over western branch of the Neshaminy Creek, Unionville, Hatfield Township, Pennsylvania
- Coordinates: 40°17′2″N 75°16′23″W
- Area: less than one acre
- Built: 1874
- Architectural style: Multi-span stone arch
- MPS: Highway Bridges Owned by the Commonwealth of Pennsylvania, Department of Transportation TR
- NRHP reference No.: 88000861
- Added to NRHP: June 22, 1988

Bridge in Hatfield Township is a historic stone arch bridge located at Unionville in Hatfield Township, Montgomery County, Pennsylvania. The bridge was built in 1874. It has two 20-foot-long (6.1 m) spans with an overall length of 100-foot (30 m). The bridge crosses the west branch of Neshaminy Creek.

It was listed on the National Register of Historic Places in 1988.
