= Max Einhorn =

Polish American gastroenterologist and writer

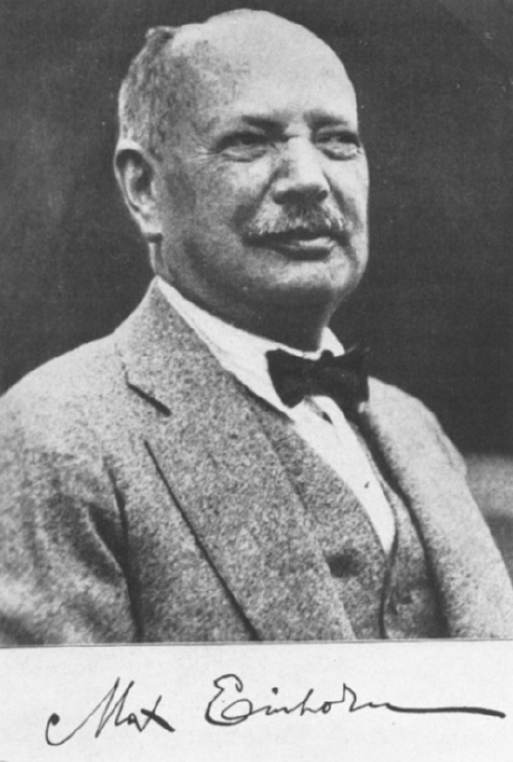
- Born: January 10, 1862; Suchowola
- Died: September 25, 1953 (aged 91); New York City
- Occupations: Gastroenterologist, inventor

Max Einhorn (January 10, 1862 – September 25, 1953) was a Polish American gastroenterologist and inventor of surgical instruments.

== Biography ==
Einhorn was born in Suchowola. He studied at the St. Vladimir University in Kyiv and obtained his M.D. from University of Berlin in 1884. He emigrated to New York in 1885 and received his license to practice medicine. Einhorn married Flora Strauss in 1892.

He was a founding member of the American Gastroenterological Society in 1897 and was its president in 1899 and 1900. He received an honorary degree from the University of Tokyo.

In 1888 he was appointed first professor of gastroenterology at the New York Post-Graduate Medical School and Hospital. He became professor emeritus in 1922. He worked from 1885–1922 at the Lenox Hill Hospital in New York. In 1935, he donated to the hospital for an auditorium, which was named after him.

Einhorn suggested the concept of Achylia gastrica which has been defined as "a functional perversion of the stomach, characterized by the absence of the gastric secretion (of hydrochloric acid, pepsin, and rennet)." In 1932, he was described as "one of the foremost gastro-enterologists of the world". He was the first to carry out a stomach biopsy.

Einhorn died at Lenox Hill Hospital. He left $750,000 to the hospital and the remainder of his two million dollar estate to charities.

== Inventions ==
He invented the Einhorn tube for gastrointestinal procedures. He also invented the gastrodiaphane or gastrodiaphanoscope which lit the stomach by transillumination and was used before the advent of x-rays. The device consisted of an electric-light bulb which passed through an esophageal tube into the stomach. Einhorn developed the "stomach bucket" which became the "duodenal bucket". It was a small oval-shaped container with an opening attached to a silk thread. The device would be swallowed by a patient allowing for gastric chemicals to be collected in the container and drawn out of the body for scientific analysis.

Einhorn's gastrograph was designed to record the movements of the stomach. The device consisted of a tube with a hollow platinum ball attached, a few electric cells, and a ticker. As the stomach moved the ball would come into contact with an electrical current which allowed gastric movements to be recorded.

== Selected publications ==
- The Gastrograph (1894)
- Diseases of the Intestines (1900)
- Practical Problems of Diet and Nutrition (1905)
- Diseases of the Stomach (1911)
- Lectures on Dietetics (1914)
- The Duodenal Tube and its Possibilities (1920)
