= Zieglerville, Pennsylvania =

Unincorporated community in Pennsylvania, US

- Unincorporated community
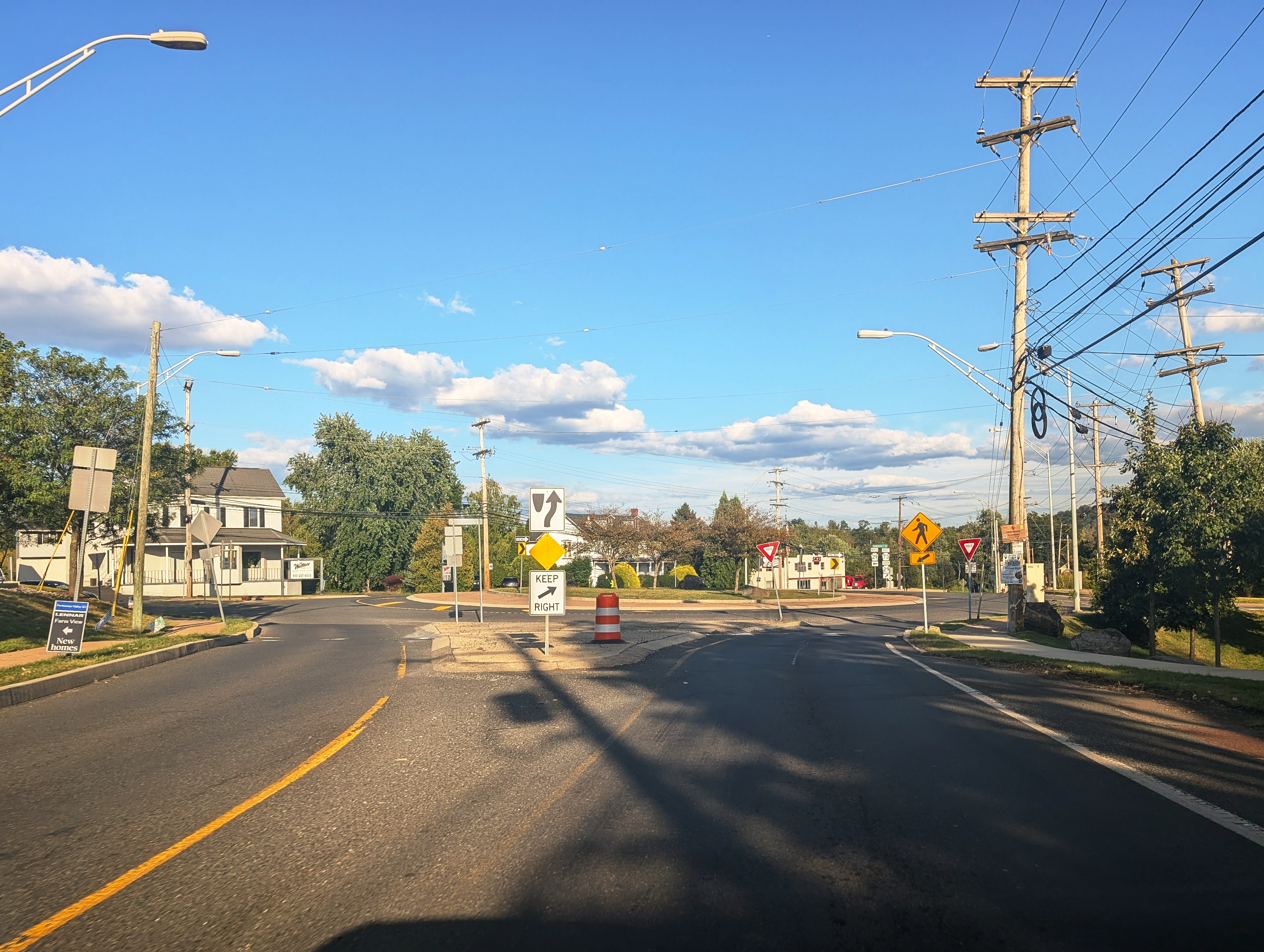
- Roundabout at PA 29 and PA 73 in the center of the village

- Location within Pennsylvania Location within the United States
- Coordinates: 40°16′37″N 75°28′48″W
- Country: United States
- State: Pennsylvania
- County: Montgomery
- Township: Lower Frederick
- Elevation: 226 ft (69 m)
- Time zone: UTC-5 (Eastern (EST))
  - Summer (DST): UTC-4 (EDT)
- ZIP Code: 19492
- Area codes: 610 and 484
- GNIS feature ID: 1988991

Zieglerville is an unincorporated community in Lower Frederick Township in Montgomery County, Pennsylvania, United States. Its ZIP Code is 19492 and it is located on the west side of the Perkiomen Creek where PA Route 29 (Gravel Pike) and PA Route 73 (Big Rd) split at a roundabout, just north of Schwenksville.

The Bridge in Upper Frederick Township was listed on the National Register of Historic Places in 1988.

== Geography ==
Zieglerville is located at 40°27′07″N 75°48′00″W It is 220 feet above sea level.

== In popular culture ==
- A season 6 episode of the Discovery Channel series A Haunting, called Black Magic, takes place in Obilesk, a small town located adjacent to Zeiglersville in 2009.
