= West Norristown Historic District =

Historic district in Pennsylvania, United States

- U.S. National Register of Historic Places
- U.S. Historic district
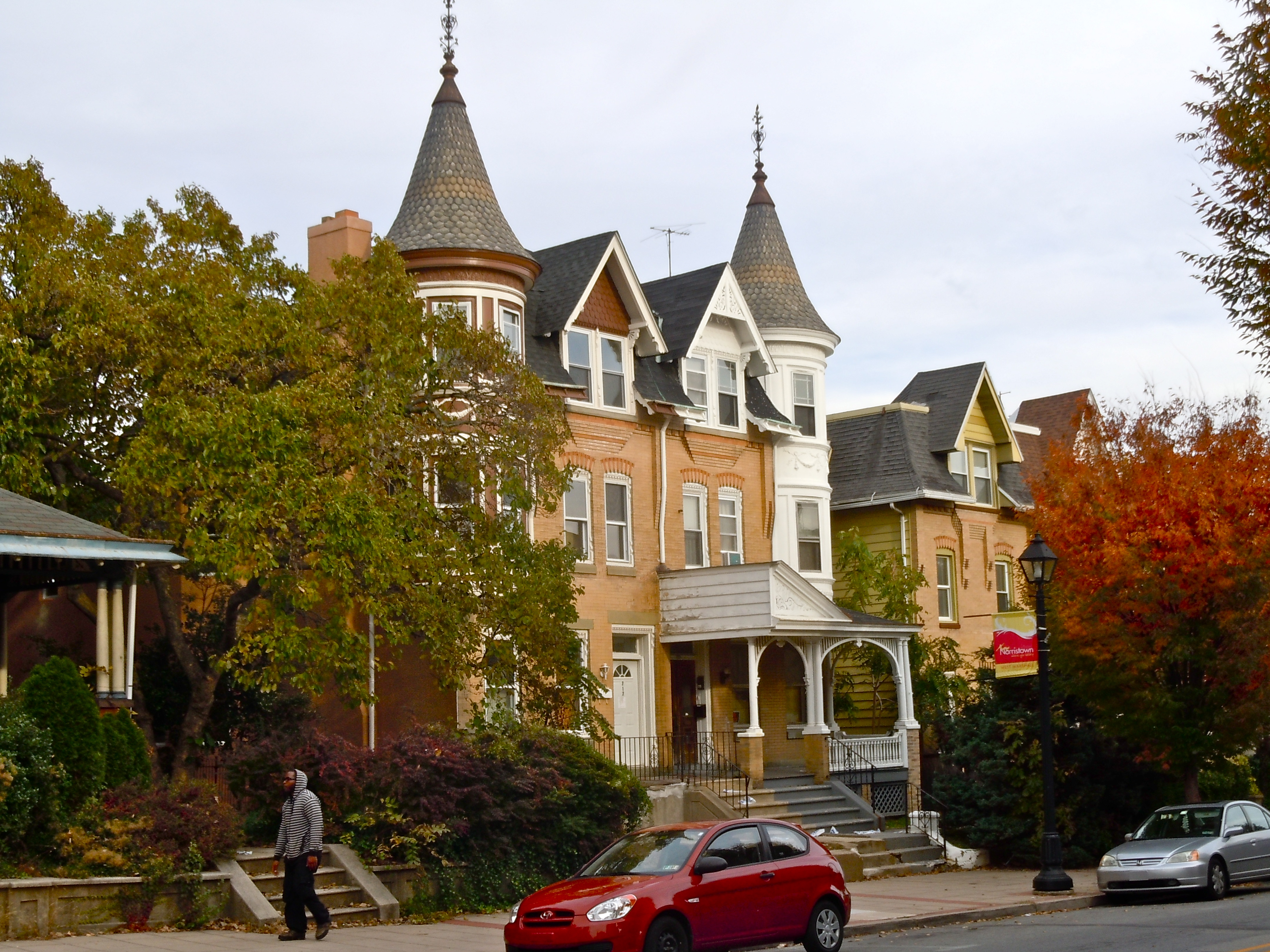
- Houses in the West Norristown Historic District, November 2011

- Location within Pennsylvania Location within the United States
- Location: Roughly bounded by Stoney Creek, Selma and Elm Sts., Norristown, Pennsylvania
- Coordinates: 40°07′18″N 75°21′09″W
- Area: 220 acres (89 ha)
- Built: 1850
- Architectural style: Late Victorian
- NRHP reference No.: 84000323
- Added to NRHP: November 23, 1984

The West Norristown Historic District is a national historic district that is located in Norristown, Montgomery County, Pennsylvania.

It was added to the National Register of Historic Places in 1984.

== History and architectural features ==
This district encompasses approximately 1,700 buildings in a primarily residential neighborhood in the West End of Norristown. The housing predominantly consists of rowhouses with a large number of semi-detached houses. The area was developed between 1885 and 1925 and the houses are in a variety of popular late-19th and early-20th-century architectural styles.
