= Fagleysville Road Bridge Crossing Swamp Creek =

- U.S. National Register of Historic Places
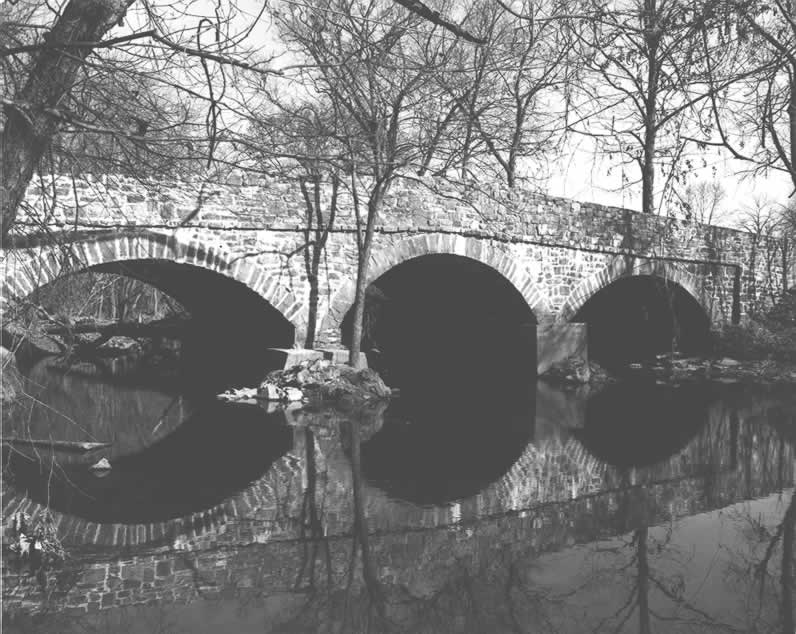
- Fagleysville Road Bridge Crossing Swamp Creek in 1982

- Location within Pennsylvania Location within the United States
- Location: Fagleysville Road over Swamp Creek, Fagleysville, Upper Frederick Township, Pennsylvania
- Coordinates: 40°17′10″N 75°32′39″W
- Area: less than one acre
- Built: 1854
- Architectural style: Multi-span stone arch
- MPS: Highway Bridges Owned by the Commonwealth of Pennsylvania, Department of Transportation TR
- NRHP reference No.: 88000864
- Added to NRHP: June 22, 1988

The Fagleysville Road Bridge Crossing Swamp Creek is a historic stone arch bridge located near Fagleysville in Montgomery County, Pennsylvania. The bridge was built in 1854. It has three 20-foot-long (6.1 m) spans with an overall length of 125-foot (38 m). The bridge crosses Swamp Creek.

It was listed on the National Register of Historic Places in 1988.
