= Gerloff Road Bridge Crossing Swamp Creek =

- U.S. National Register of Historic Places
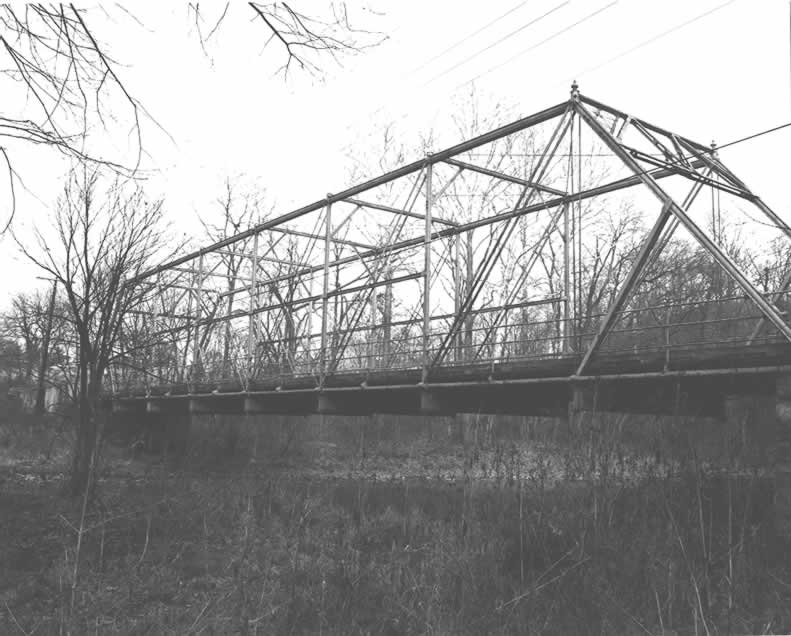
- Gerloff Road Bridge in 1982

- Location within Pennsylvania Location within the United States
- Location: Gerloff Road over Swamp Creek, near Zieglerville, Pennsylvania
- Coordinates: 40°16′28″N 75°29′7″W
- Built: 1888
- Built by: Phoenix Bridge Co
- Architectural style: Pratt through truss
- MPS: Highway Bridges Owned by the Commonwealth of Pennsylvania, Department of Transportation TR
- NRHP reference No.: 88000838
- Added to NRHP: June 22, 1988

The Gerloff Road Bridge Crossing Swamp Creek is a historic Pratt through truss bridge located near Zieglerville in Montgomery County, Pennsylvania. The bridge was built in 1888, by the Phoenix Bridge Co of Phoenixville, Pennsylvania. It has a single 135-foot-long (41 m) span. The bridge crosses Swamp Creek.

It was listed on the National Register of Historic Places in 1988.
