= Eastern Berks Gateway Railroad =

Overview
- Headquarters: Boyertown, Pennsylvania
- Reporting mark: EBG
- Locale: Boyertown to Pottstown, Pennsylvania
- Dates of operation: 2010–present
- Predecessor: East Penn Railroad

Technical
- Track gauge: 4 ft 8 1/2 in (1,435 mm) standard gauge
- Length: 8.6 miles

Other
- Website: http://www.colebrookdalerailroad.com/freight-service.html

The Eastern Berks Gateway Railroad (reporting mark EBG) is a short-line railroad located in Boyertown, Pennsylvania, it runs from Boyertown south to Pottstown over the Colebrookdale branch, where it interchanges with the Norfolk Southern Railway. The railroad was operated by U.S. Rail Partners until 2013, when the Colebrookdale Railroad Preservation Trust took over.

== Operations ==
The Eastern Berks Gateway Railroad operates the 8.6-mile (13.8 km) long Colebrookdale Spur between Boyertown and Pottstown. In Pottstown, it interchanges with the Norfolk Southern Railway. The railroad is operated by the Colebrookdale Railroad Preservation Trust. The tracks the railroad operates on are owned by Berks County.

The inaugural run of a passenger service geared towards railfan tourism took place on January 17, 2014. The passenger line was ready for regular operation in October 2014 and is operated as the Colebrookdale Railroad.

== History ==
The Colebrookdale Railroad started building the railroad line between Boyertown and Pottstown in 1865 to serve the iron ore industry along the Manatawny Creek and trains started running in 1869. The line, which featured both freight and passenger service, originally continued further north to Bechtelsville and Barto before service was later cut back to Boyertown. The Colebrookdale Railroad was leased by the Reading Railroad who operated the line until 1976, when it became a part of Conrail. Conrail planned to abandon the line, but the Pennsylvania Department of Transportation acquired the line and hired operators. The line was operated by the Anthracite Railway, the Blue Mountain & Reading Railroad, and Penn Eastern Rail Lines. In March 2001, Berks County acquired the line for $155,000 to keep it active; the line was soon sold to Penn Eastern Rail Lines. The Colebrookdale Spur was abandoned by the East Penn Railroad (the successor to Penn Eastern Rail Lines) in 2008. The Berks County Redevelopment Authority reactivated the line, with the Eastern Berks Gateway Railroad appointed to operate the line beginning in October 2010. The railroad is working on developing freight traffic on the line. The Eastern Berks Gateway Railroad was owned by U.S. Rail Partners, which is based in Illinois. At the end of 2013, the Colebrookdale Railroad Preservation Trust took over operations of the Eastern Berks Gateway Railroad from U.S. Rail Partners.

In 2011, a tourist railroad was proposed to operate on the line. Tourist passenger operations began in early October 2014 with a series of "soft" trips, intended to work out any operational issues before the full and widely advertised grand opening on October 18. The Colebrookdale Railroad began regular tourist service on October 18, 2014.
