= Pottstown Airport =

Pottstown Airport may refer to:

- Heritage Field Airport (formerly Pottstown Limerick Airport) in Pottstown, Pennsylvania, United States (FAA: PTW)
- Pottstown Municipal Airport in Pottstown, Pennsylvania, United States (FAA: N47)
