= Pottstown station =

Railway station in Pottstown, Pennsylvania

Pottstown Station
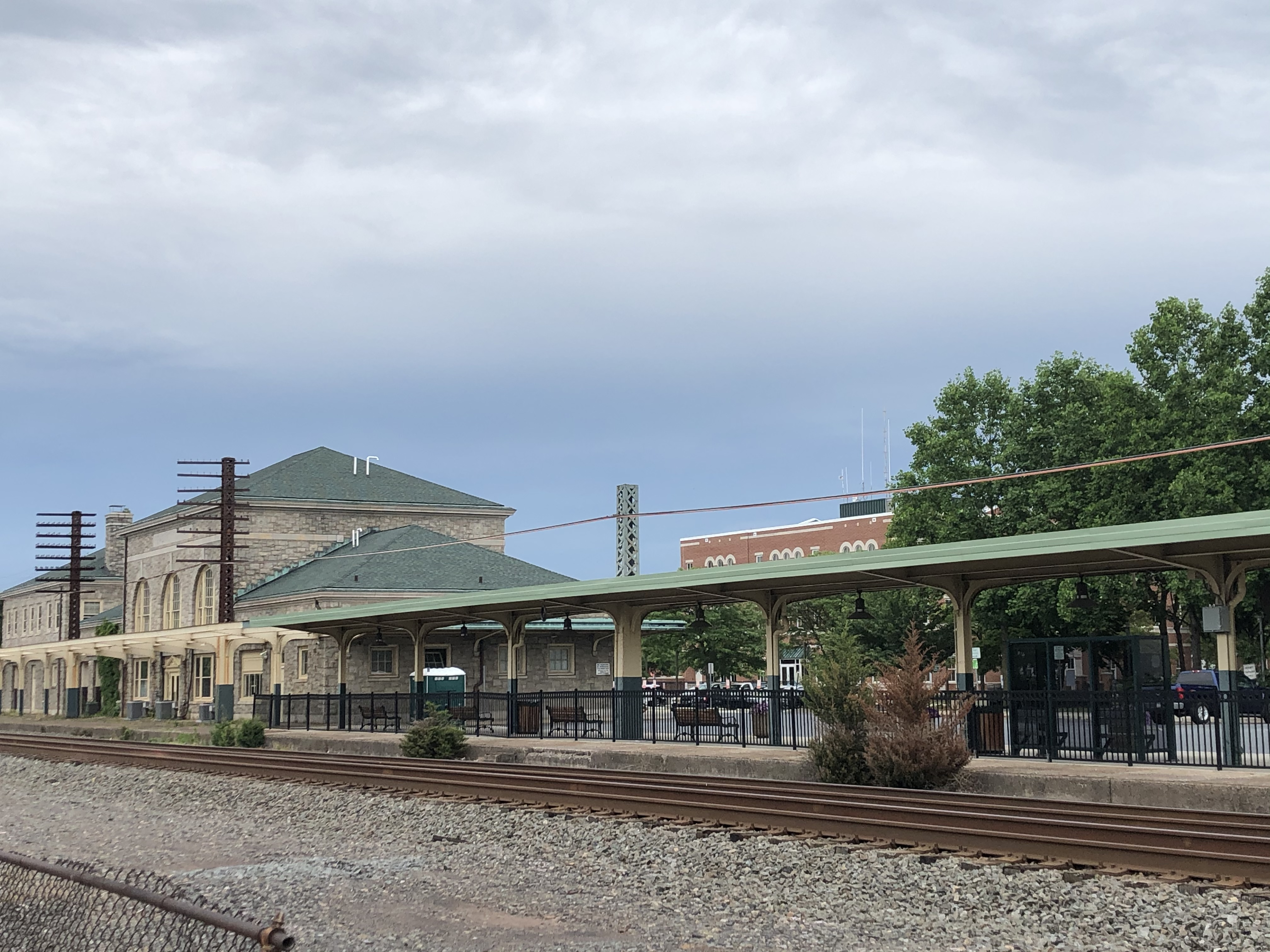
- Former Pottstown station and Charles W. Dickinson Transportation Center in 2020

General information
- Location: High Street between Hanover and York Streets, Pottstown, Pennsylvania
- Lines: Colebrookdale branch; Harrisburg Line
- Connections: Schuylkill River Trail; PART bus lines SEPTA 93 to Norristown

History
- Closed: July 26, 1981

Services
Preceding station	Colebrookdale Railroad	Following station
Terminus	Secret Valley Line	Boyertown Terminus
Former services
Preceding station	SEPTA	Following station
Birdsboro Closed 1981 toward Pottsville	Pottsville Line	Linfield Closed 1978 toward Reading Terminal
Preceding station	Reading Railroad	Following station
Stowe toward Pottsville	Main Line	Sanatoga toward Philadelphia
Terminus	Colebrookdale branch	Mill Park toward Barto
- Reading Railroad Pottstown Station
- U.S. National Register of Historic Places
- Interactive map of Reading Railroad Pottstown Station
- Coordinates: 40°14′41″N 75°39′9″W
- Area: 1.2 acres (0.49 ha)
- Built: 1928
- Architect: Dillenbeck, Clark
- Architectural style: Classical Revival
- NRHP reference No.: 84003514
- Added to NRHP: January 12, 1984
Location

The Pottstown station, now referred to as the Charles W. Dickinson Transportation Center, is a bus terminal of the Pottstown Area Rapid Transit system. It is located in Pottstown, Pennsylvania.

== History and notable features ==
The station was built in 1928 as a train station for the Reading Railroad and was active long enough to be served by SEPTA diesel service trains until 1981. It was added to the National Register of Historic Places on January 12, 1984, as the Reading Railroad Pottstown Station, and is located in the Old Pottstown Historic District, close to the Schuylkill River Trail.

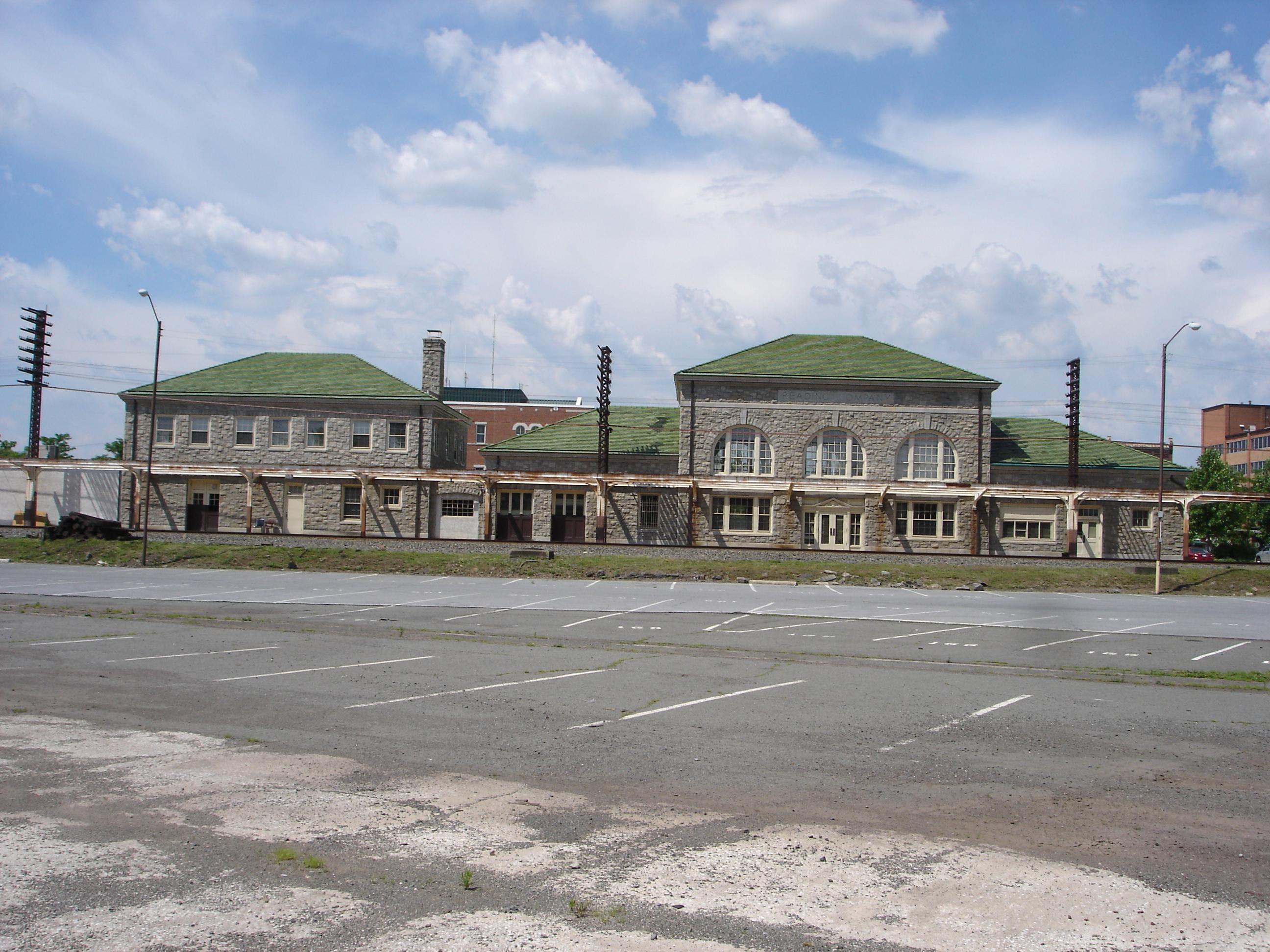
Reading Pottstown station from parking lot

The station was designed in the Classical Revival style by the railroad's engineering staff, rather than by an outside architect. Stations built in the nineteenth century by the Reading Railroad had usually been designed by outside architects, including Frank Furness.

During the twentieth century, the railroad became less profitable and most stations were designed in simpler styles in-house.

== See also ==
- National Register of Historic Places listings in Montgomery County, Pennsylvania
