= Boyertown station =

Coordinates: 40°19′53.8″N 75°38′11.2″W

Boyertown
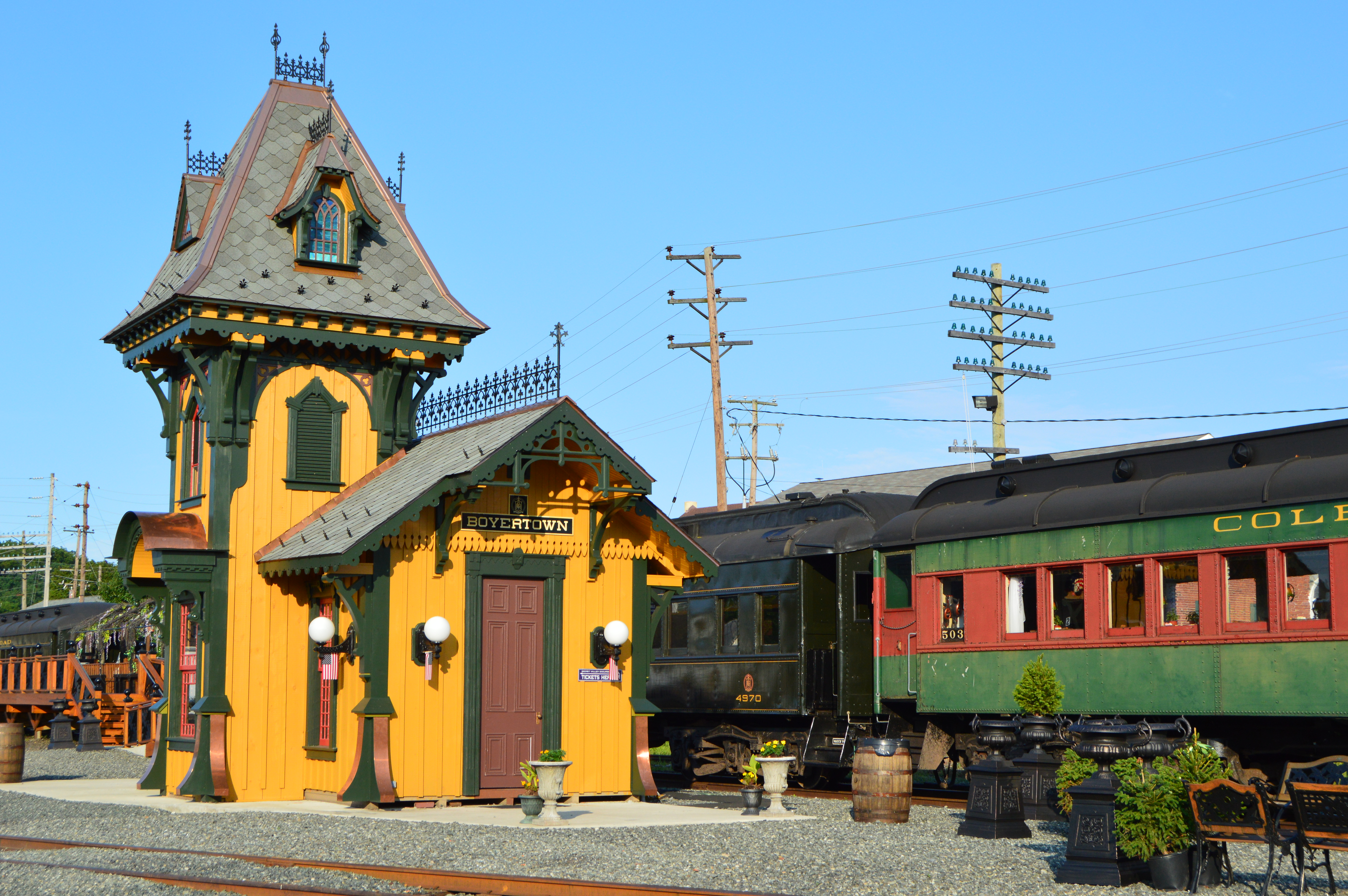
- Colebrookdale Railroad train at Boyertown in 2017

General information
- System: Colebrookdale Railroad heritage railroad station Former Reading Railroad station
- Line: Colebrookdale branch

History
- Opened: September 6, 1869

Services
Preceding station	Colebrookdale Railroad	Following station
Pottstown Terminus	Secret Valley Line	Terminus
Former services
Preceding station	Reading Railroad	Following station
Colebrookdale toward Pottstown	Colebrookdale branch	New Berlinsville toward Barto
Location

Boyertown station was a Reading Company station in Boyertown, Pennsylvania on the Colebrookdale branch that is currently a heritage railroad station served by the Colebrookdale Railroad. Reading passenger service ended in 1950. There is currently a small building serving as the ticket house, but there are plans in the works to build a grand 8000 square foot station that would serve as the main station with a restaurant. Once that is complete the current station will turn into a bike rental.
