= Heritage Field =

Heritage Field may refer to:

- Yankee Stadium (1923), or a park that now exists on its former site, Bronx, New York
- Heritage Field (airport), Montgomery County, Pennsylvania
- A former name for Adelanto Stadium, Adelanto, California
