= Colebrookdale branch =

Railway line in Pennsylvania, U.S.

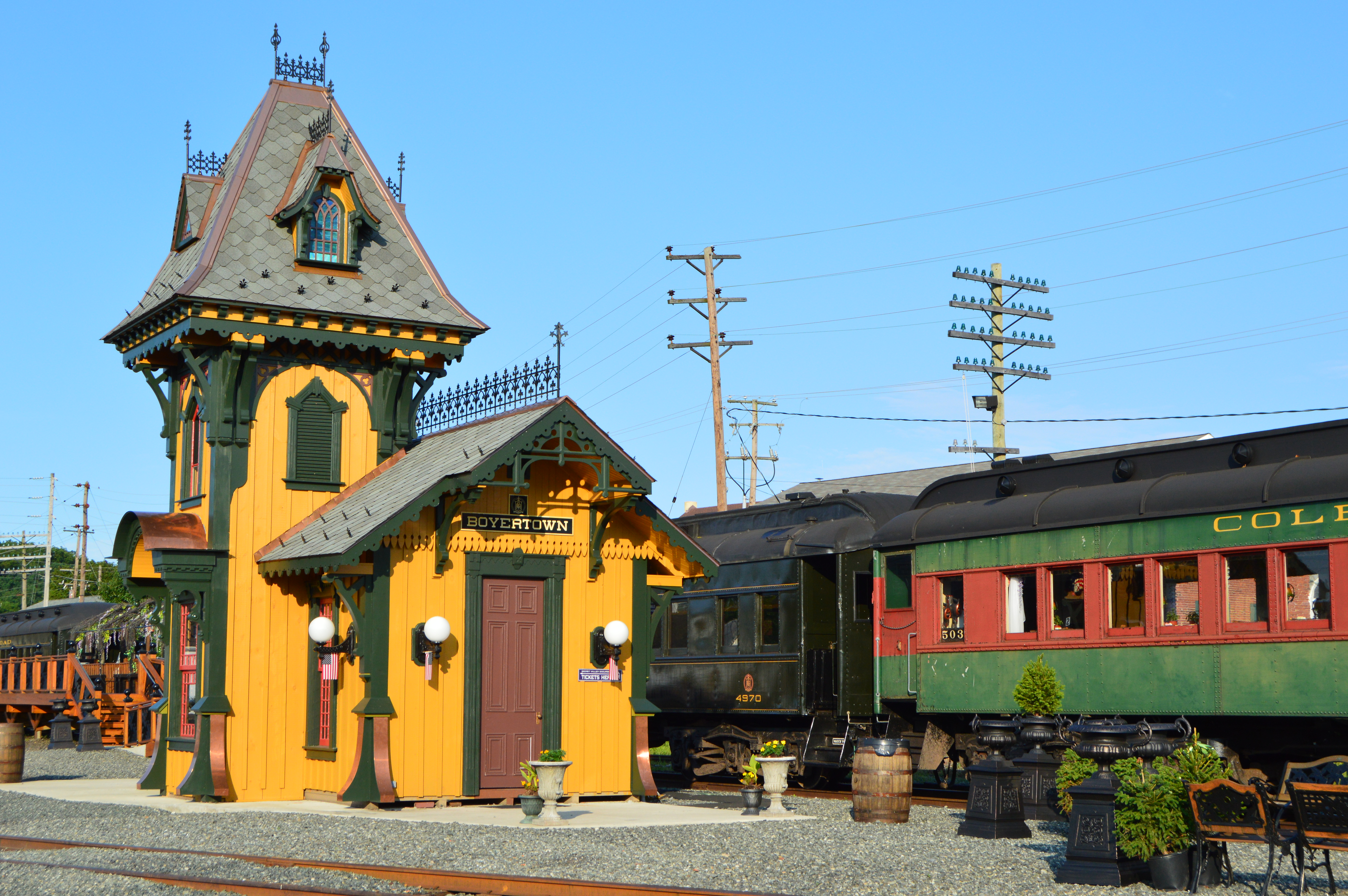
- Excursion train at Boyertown in 2017

Overview
- Owner: Berks County, Pennsylvania
- Locale: Berks County, Pennsylvania

History
- Opened: 6 September 1869

Technical
- Line length: 8.6 mi (13.8 km)
- Number of tracks: 1
- Track gauge: 1,435 mm (4 ft 8 1/2 in) standard gauge

The Colebrookdale branch, also known as the Colebrookdale spur, Colebrookdale industrial track or Colebrookdale line, is a railway line in Pennsylvania. It runs 8.6 miles (13.8 km) from a junction with the Harrisburg Line in Pottstown to Boyertown. At its fullest extent, the line continued another 4 miles (6.4 km) to Barto. The line was built between 1868 and 1869 by the Colebrookdale Railroad (not to be confused with the heritage railway of the same name) and part of the Reading Company system until 1976. Berks County has owned the line since 2009. The Eastern Berks Gateway Railroad operates freight service; heritage passenger services are run under the Colebrookdale Railroad name.

== History ==
Map

The first Colebrookdale Railroad was incorporated on March 23, 1865. The company completed a line between Pottstown and Boyertown, branching off from the main line of the Philadelphia and Reading Railroad, on September 6, 1869. The extension from Boyertown to Barto opened on November 16. The Philadelphia and Reading leased the company on the completion of the line.

The Colebrookdale Railroad was one of twelve railroads merged into the Reading Company effective December 31, 1945. Passenger service over the branch ended in 1950. The Reading filed to abandon the last 1.6 miles (2.6 km) of the branch, between Bechtelsville and Barto, in 1965. On the Reading Company's final bankruptcy in 1976, ownership of the line remained with the reorganized Reading estate. The final system plan of the United States Railway Association classed the line as "light density" and it was not conveyed to Conrail. Conrail operated the line under subsidy.

Pennsylvania purchased the line in 1982 and designed the newly organized Anthracite Railway as the operator in 1983. The Reading Blue Mountain and Northern Railroad replaced the Anthracite Railway as the operator in 1989. The Reading Blue Mountain and Northern Railroad did not bid for renewal of the lease in 1995 and was succeeded by East Penn Railways, with an option to buy the line outright. Penn Eastern Rail Lines acquired East Penn Railways in 1997. Berks County purchased the line from the state in 2001. The East Penn Railroad acquired Penn Eastern Rail Lines in 2007 and purchased the line from Berks County.

Less than a year later, the East Penn Railroad successfully filed to abandon the line, on the grounds that providing service was not economically viable. In response, Berks County acquired the line again in 2009. The Eastern Berks Gateway Railroad, a subsidiary of US Rail Partners, assumed operation in 2010. Colebrookdale Railroad Preservation Trust assumed control of the Eastern Berks Gateway Railroad in 2013, and began running passenger excursions under the Colebrookdale Railroad name in 2014.
