= KPTW =

KPTW may refer to:

- KPTW (TV), a television station (channel 8, virtual 6) licensed to Casper, Wyoming, United States
- The ICAO code for Heritage Field Airport
