= N47 =

N47 may refer to:

- N47 (Long Island bus)
- Amurdak language
- BMW N47, an automobile engine
- HNoMS Tyr (N47), a minesweeper of the Royal Norwegian Navy
- Nebraska Highway 47, in the United States
- Pottstown Municipal Airport, in Montgomery County, Pennsylvania, United States
