= Christ Episcopal Church, Pottstown =

Episcopal church in Pottstown, Pennsylvania, United States

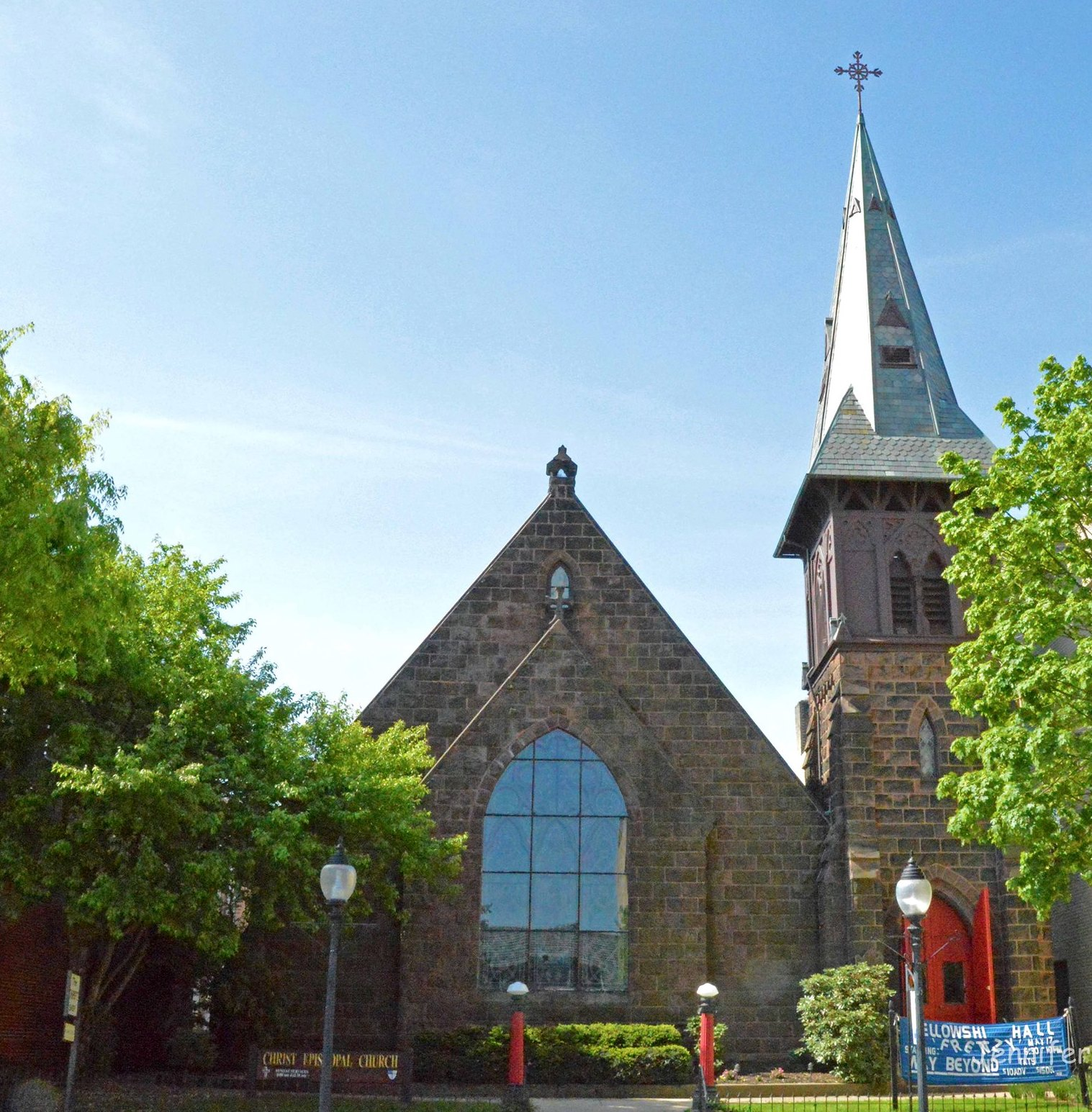

- Location within Pennsylvania Location within the United States
- 40.24475952463461°N 75.64682402817921°W
- Location: 316 E. High St. Pottstown, Pennsylvania 19464
- Country: United States
- Denomination: Episcopal
- Website: christpottstown.org

History
- Founded: 1824
- Dedication: Jesus Christ
- Consecrated: November 24, 1846

Architecture
- Years built: 1846

Christ Episcopal Church, Pottstown is a parish of the Episcopal Diocese of Pennsylvania in Pottstown, Pennsylvania. It was chartered in 1824 (approved by the Commonwealth of Pennsylvania on December 15, 1825). Before the formal organization of the church, services in the area were conducted by colonial missionaries of the Society for the Propagation of the Gospel in Foreign Parts (SPG) centered at St. Gabriel's Church, Douglassville. In 2024, it reported 65 average Sunday attendance (ASA), and $173,624 in plate and pledge financial support. The 2023 membership figures reported 317 persons.

The current church building was consecrated by the Right Rev. Alonzo Potter on November 24, 1846. The building was enlarged substantially in 1902. The church had an extensive Christian education outreach to children of miners at the nearby Phoenixville Iron Works ore mines and forge beginning in 1838. Pews were originally rented, a practice that ended between 1919 and 1923. The building is a part of the Old Pottstown Historic District, added to the National Register of Historic Places in 1985.

In 1967, the church began using The New Liturgy, a predecessor of the 1979 American Book of Common Prayer. The church's organ is a c. 1916 Austin Organ Co. (Opus 632) with two manuals and 20 ranks.

The parish has had a number of internal organizations, including the Brotherhood of St. Andrew for men, Episcopal Church Women, an altar guild, youth group, Sunday School, the Society of Mary, the Girls' Friendly Society, etc.

The church's rector from 2018 to 2026 was the Rev. Joshua Caler, a graduate of the Duke University Divinity School.

== Online material ==
- Order of Dedication for the Parish Building (1931)
- William Herbert Price, The History of Christ Church, Pottstown, Pa. (1940)
- Morison Blake, The History of Christ Church, Pottstown (1964) from Project Canterbury
- Robert E. Day, Christ Episcopal Church, Pottstown, Pa.: The History (1997)
