= Old Pottstown Historic District =

Historic district in Pennsylvania, United States

- U.S. National Register of Historic Places
- U.S. Historic district
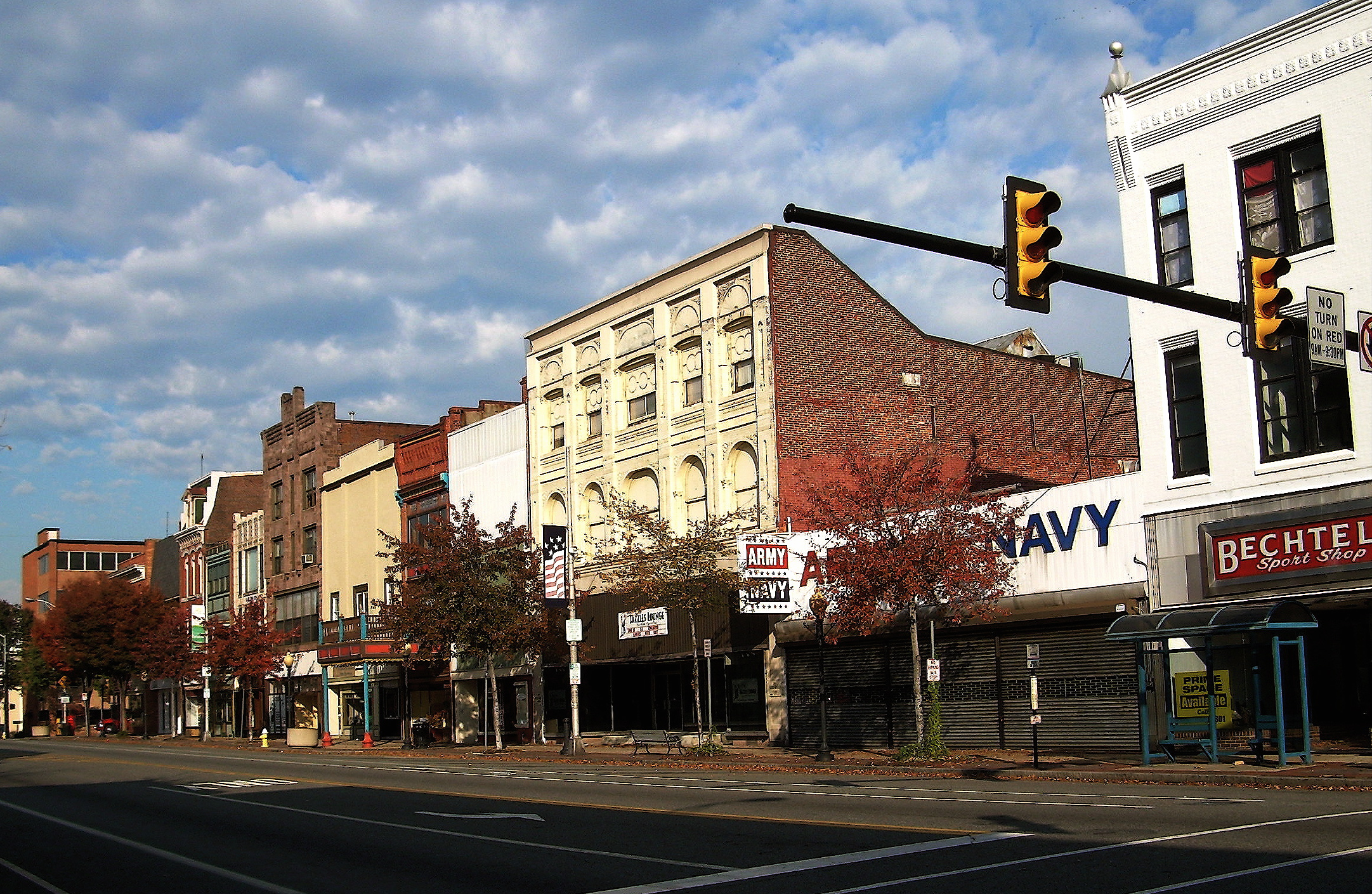
- High Street, Old Pottstown Historic District, 2007

- Location within Pennsylvania Location within the United States
- Location: Roughly bounded by South, Race, Bailey, Adams, Lincoln, Beech, & Manatawny Sts., Pottstown, Pennsylvania
- Coordinates: 40°14′44″N 75°38′48″W
- Area: 184.9 acres (74.8 ha)
- Architect: Multiple
- Architectural style: Late Victorian, Gothic Revival, Federal, Italianate
- NRHP reference No.: 85001955, 91001715 (Boundary Increase)
- Added to NRHP: September 5, 1985, November 14, 1991 (Boundary Increase)

The Old Pottstown Historic District is a national historic district that is located in Pottstown, Montgomery County, Pennsylvania.

It was added to the National Register of Historic Places in 1985, with a boundary increase in 1991.

== History and architectural features ==
This district encompasses 956 contributing buildings and one contributing site that are located in the central business district and surrounding residential areas of Pottstown. It features a variety of residential buildings, such as workers' home and residences of prominent and wealthy citizens that were designed in a variety of architectural styles, including Late Victorian, Gothic Revival, and Federal. Also located in this district is the separately-listed Pottsgrove Mansion. Notable non-residential buildings are the Italianate-style commercial buildings on High Street, 1725 Roller Mills, the Reading Railroad station (1928), the Doehler-Jarvis castings plant, the Light Foundry building (1880), the Ecker Building (c. 1910), the Weitzenkorn Building, the Security Trust Building (1888), the Elks Home (1896), the Pottstown Library (1920), the Pottstown Borough Hall (1924), the Masonic Temple (1926), Christ Episcopal Church (1872), First Methodist Church (1869), and St. Aloysius Roman Catholic Church (1891). Also located in the district is the Searles Memorial Methodist Church (1911), which was designed by architect Joseph Miller Huston (1866–1940).

This district was added to the National Register of Historic Places in 1985, with a boundary increase in 1991.
