= Canadian National 5288 =

Canadian 4-6-2 locomotive preserved in the United States

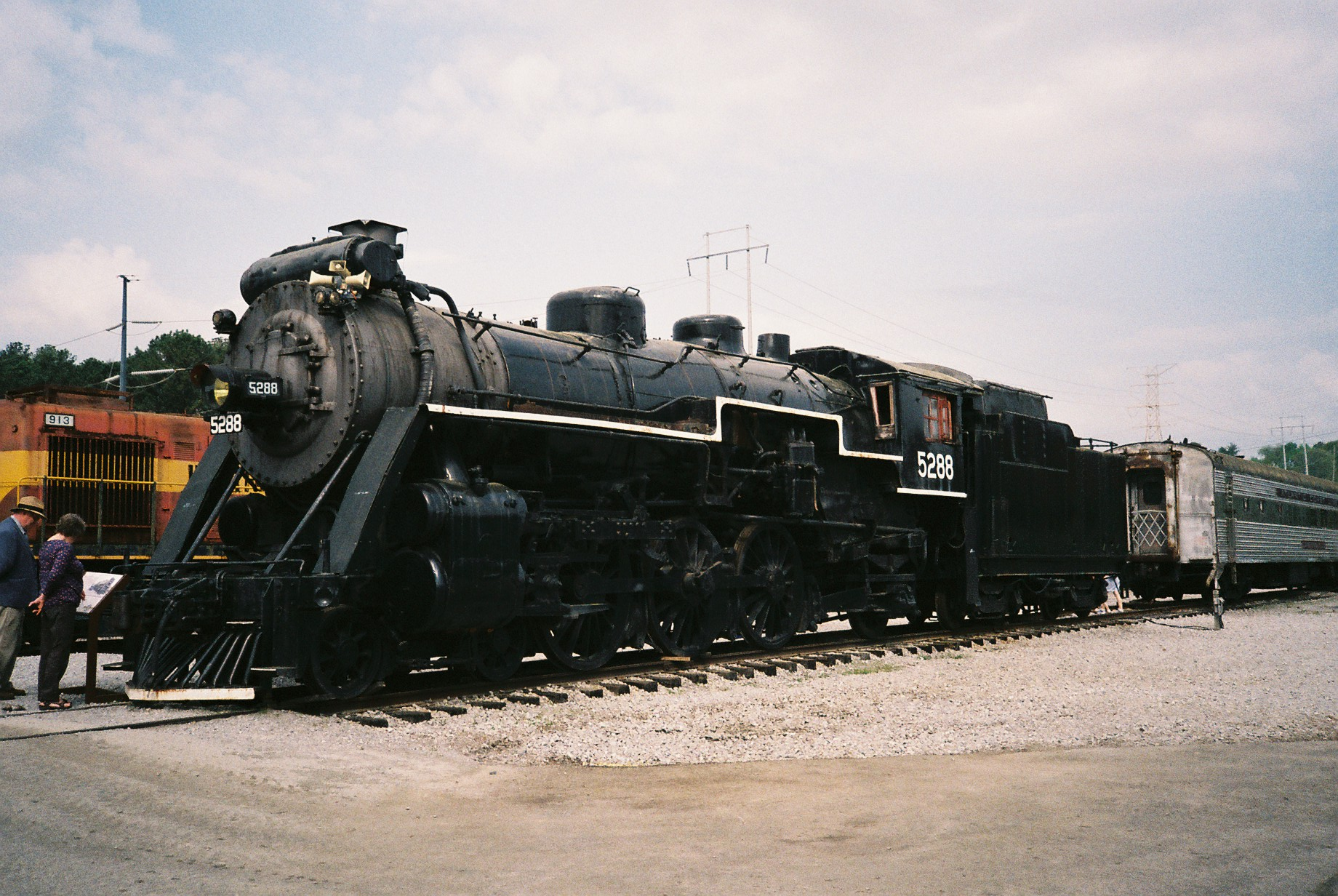
- Canadian National No. 5288 on display at the Tennessee Valley Railroad Museum in April 2013
Type and origin
- Power type: Steam
- Builder: Montreal Locomotive Works
- Serial number: 60483
- Build date: June 1919
Specifications
- Configuration
  - Whyte: 4-6-2
  - UIC: 2′C1′ h
- Gauge: 4 ft 8 1/2 in (1,435 mm) standard gauge
- Driver dia.: 69 in (1,753 mm)
- Adhesive weight: 268,000 lb (121.6 tonnes)
- Fuel type: Coal
- Fuel capacity: 14 t (14 long tons; 15 short tons)
- Water cap.: 7,100 US gallons (27,000 L)
- Boiler pressure: 200 psi (1.38 MPa)
- Cylinders: Two, outside
- Cylinder size: 24 in × 28 in (610 mm × 711 mm)
- Valve gear: Walschaerts
- Valve type: Piston valves
- Loco brake: Air
- Train brakes: Air
- Couplers: Knuckle
Performance figures
- Tractive effort: 39,735 lbf (176.75 kN)
Career
- Operators: Canadian Government Railways; Grand Trunk Railway; Canadian National Railway
- Class: J-7-b
- Numbers: CGR 1516; GT 1516; CN 5288
- Retired: 1960
- Current owner: Colebrookdale Railroad
- Disposition: On temporary static display, awaiting restoration to operating condition

Canadian National 5288 is a J-7-b class 4-6-2 "Pacific" type steam locomotive, built in June 1919 by the Montreal Locomotive Works (MLW), originally for the Canadian Government Railways (CGR) as No. 516 and later No. 5288 on the Canadian National Railway (CN). It was on display at the Tennessee Valley Railroad Museum (TVRM) in Chattanooga, Tennessee. However, in April 2023, it was acquired by the Colebrookdale Railroad (EBGX) in Boyertown, Pennsylvania to be restored to operating condition for use in tourist excursion service.

== History ==
No. 5288 was originally planned to be numbered as No. 516, and it was built as part of an order placed in June 1918 by the Canadian Government Railways (CGR) for fifteen J-7-b class 4-6-2s (Nos. 508–522) to be built by the Montreal Locomotive Works. During their construction, CGR opted to lease them to the Grand Trunk Railway (GTR), and to avoid duplication with the GTR's 500 series 2-8-2s, the J-7-bs were renumbered as Nos. 1508–1522, with No. 516 renumbered as No. 1516. In December 1918, the CGR was absorbed into the Canadian National Railway (CN), and as part of a subsequent renumbering process, Nos. 1508–1522 were renumbered again as Nos. 5280–5294—with No. 1516 becoming No. 5288.

In 1922, they were sold to the GTR, and they continued to operate for them until the following year, when the GTR was also absorbed into CN. In revenue service, No. 5288 was mostly assigned to haul passenger trains throughout eastern Canada, but it also occasionally hauled international trains to White River Junction on the Central Vermont Railway (CV). By 1956, No. 5288 was relegated to haul commuter trains around Montreal, Quebec, and then in 1960, No. 5288 was retired from CN, being stored serviceable in their Turcot roundhouse.

In 1961, the locomotive was purchased by F. Nelson Blount, who added it to his Steamtown, U.S.A. collection in North Walpole, New Hampshire, before it was quickly relocated to Bellows Falls, Vermont. During its move to Steamtown, No. 5288 was attacked by brass thieves, who stole multiple piping and parts, including the gauges and brass valve levers from its cab. In 1984, the locomotive was moved again, along with most of the Steamtown collection, to Scranton, Pennsylvania, where it was later reorganized as Steamtown National Historic Site by 1995. No. 5288 became listed as a surplus locomotive.

Concurrently, the Tennessee Valley Railroad Museum (TVRM) of Chattanooga, Tennessee, had been searching to acquire a 4-6-2 locomotive with a desire to cosmetically alter it to resemble a Southern Railway Ps-4. No. 5288 was chosen as a good candidate since it had been overhauled shortly before retirement. In 2001, it was moved to TVRM and placed on static display in Chattanooga, but with the museum focusing on maintaining their other locomotives and operations, No. 5288 was never restored under their ownership. In the early 2010s, No. 5288 had its coal stoker removed for use on Southern Railway 4501.

In April 2023, No. 5288 was acquired by the Colebrookdale Railroad (EBGX), in Boyertown, Pennsylvania, and they plan to eventually restore it to operating condition for use in tourist excursion service. It is the third steam locomotive rostered by the Colebrookdale Railroad, with the others being Grand Trunk Western No. 5030 and Lake Superior and Ishpeming No. 18. On May 5, it was towed by diesels from the TVRM and later arrived at the Colebrookdale Railroad on June 29. Plans call for the locomotive to be rebuilt to resemble the Southern Railway Ps-4 class, and also to possibly make the locomotive the world's first zero-emissions steam locomotive.
