= John Potts (Pennsylvanian) =

American merchant (died 1768)

- Born: c. 1710; Philadelphia. Province of Pennsylvania, British America
- Died: 6 June 1768 (aged 57 or 58); Pottstown, Province of Pennsylvania, British America
- Spouse: Ruth Savage (m. 1734; died 1768)
- Children: 13
- Parents: Thomas Potts (father); Martha Potts (mother)

John Potts (c. 1710 – 6 June 1768) was the founder of Pottstown, Pennsylvania. He was also an ironmaster, merchant, and English Quaker.

== Early life ==
Potts was born about 1710, probably in Philadelphia, the oldest son of Thomas and Martha (Keurlis) Potts.

== Career ==
Like his father, Potts was an enterprising businessman, and for many years was the largest and most successful iron-master in the Thirteen Colonies, operating mines, furnaces and forges in Pennsylvania and Virginia. He served as Justice of the Peace, and was also a judge of the Pennsylvania Court of Common Pleas.

In 1752, he purchased two tracts of land at the confluence of Manatawny Creek and Schuylkill River, aggregating nearly 1,000 acres. There he laid out the town that became Pottstown, Pennsylvania.

== Pottsgrove Manor ==
In 1752, Potts built a Georgian style home, Pottsgrove Manor, in Pottstown.

In 1974, the house was added to the National Register of Historic Places. The house has been restored and is now an 18th-century historic house museum owned by Montgomery County.

== Personal life ==
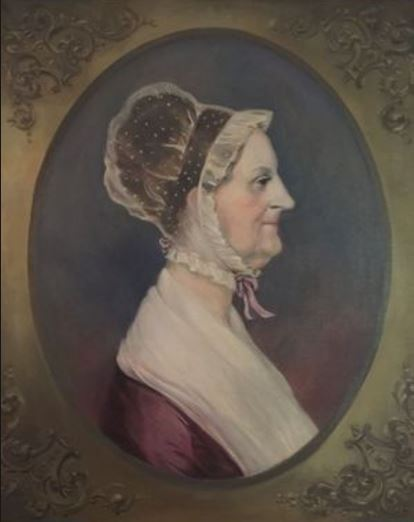
Ruth Savage Potts

Potts married Ruth Savage, daughter of Samuel and Ann (Rutter) Savage, on April 11, 1734. They had 13 children together: Thomas (b. 1735), Samuel (b. 1736), John (b. 1738), Martha (b. 1739 or 1740), David (b. 1741) Joseph (b. 1742), Jonathan (b. 1745), Anna (b. 1747), Isaac (b. 1750), James (b. 1752), Rebeccah (b. 1755), Jesse (b. circa 1757), and Ruth (b. 1759).
