= Pottstown Roller Mill =

Historic mill in Pennsylvania, United States

- U.S. National Register of Historic Places
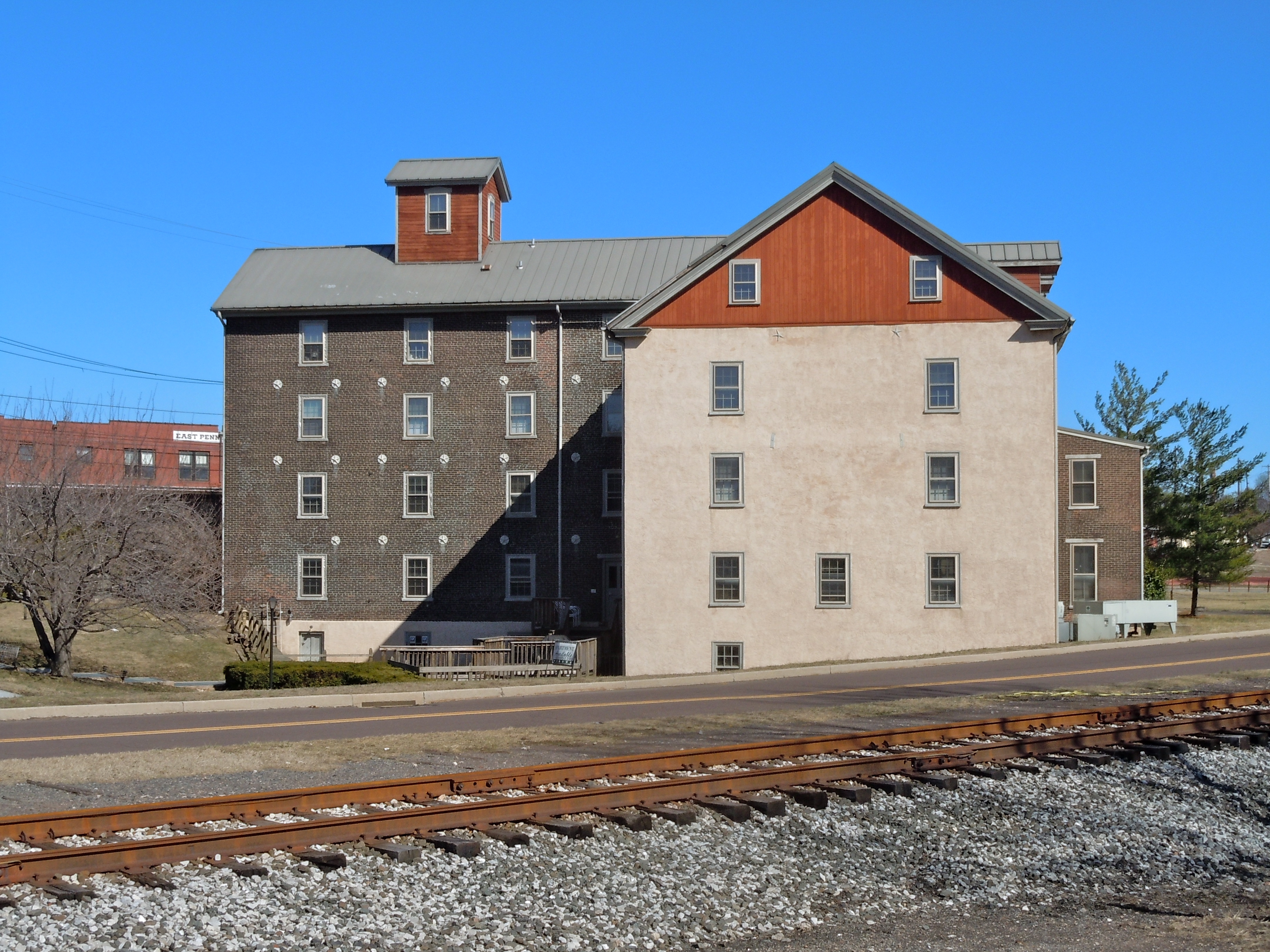
- Pottstown Roller Mill, March 2011

- Location within Pennsylvania Location within the United States
- Location: South and Hanover Sts., Pottstown, Pennsylvania
- Coordinates: 40°14′36″N 75°39′8″W
- Area: 1.5 acres (0.61 ha)
- Built: 1725, 1849, 1856
- NRHP reference No.: 74001797
- Added to NRHP: October 10, 1974

The Pottstown Roller Mill is an historic roller mill that is located near the Schuylkill River in Pottstown, Montgomery County, Pennsylvania, United States.

Added to the National Register of Historic Places in 1974, the Pottstown Roller Mills, Inc. survives today at 625 Industrial Highway, less than a mile from the original historic building.

== History and architectural features ==
The original mill building was built in 1725. It was constructed of fieldstone and was two stories tall, three bays wide, and two deep. It provided flour to George Washington's Continental Army during the Revolutionary War.

The mill's structure was improved in 1849 and again in 1856 when two brick stories were added to the original fieldstone building. The five-bay brick addition doubled the size of the 1856 mill. It then became "the roller mill of Jesse Ives ... that provided shelter for escaping slaves" as part of the Underground Railroad.

This property also includes a contributing dam and mill race.

It faced extensive flooding due to Hurricane Agnes in 1972 but served the community continuously despite major damages. Although the mill no longer sold flour, "a post-Revolutionary War era water wheel turned by a race stream siphoned from the Manatawny still provide[d] most of the power to operate the mill."
