= Pottsgrove Mansion =

Historic house in Pennsylvania, United States

- Pottsgrove Manor
- U.S. National Register of Historic Places
- Pennsylvania state historical marker
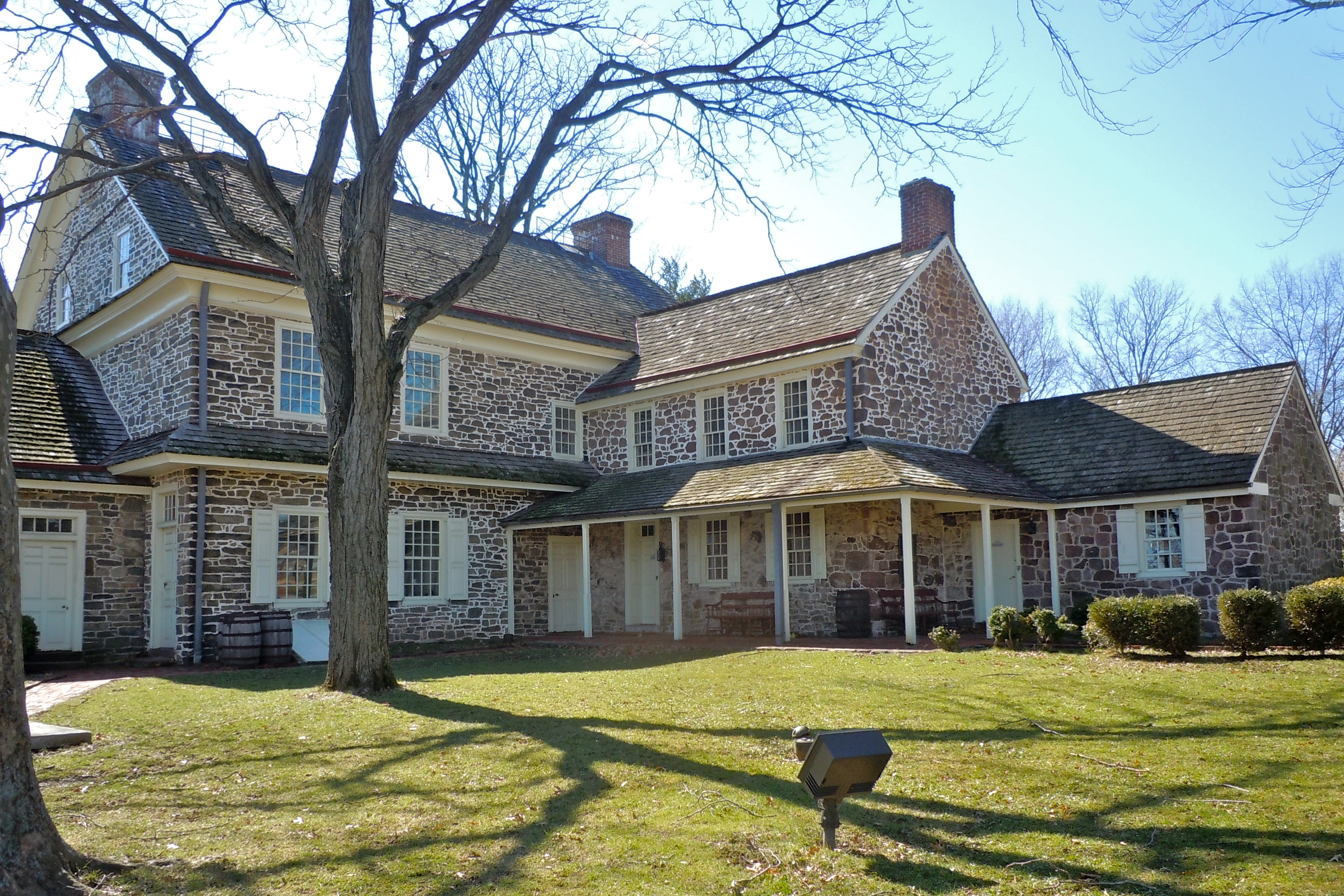
- Pottsgrove Manor, March 2011

- Location within Pennsylvania Location within the United States
- Location: West of Pottstown on Benjamin Franklin Highway (High Street), Pottstown, Pennsylvania, U.S.
- Coordinates: 40°14′52″N 75°39′35″W
- Area: 3 acres (1.2 ha)
- Built: 1752
- Architectural style: Early Georgian
- NRHP reference No.: 74001796

Significant dates
- Added to NRHP: January 18, 1974
- Designated PHMC: September 25, 2000

Pottsgrove Manor, also known as the John Potts House, is an historic home that is located in Pottstown, Montgomery County, Pennsylvania, United States.

Located in the Old Pottstown Historic District, it was added to the National Register of Historic Places in 1974.

== History and architectural features ==
This historic structure was built in 1752 by John Potts, and is a large two-story, rectangular, sandstone and fieldstone building that was designed in the Georgian style. It has a five-bay front facade, a gable roof, and a center hall plan. The service wing was added between 1790 and 1805, and the rebuilt east wing was added between 1941 and 1952 during a restoration.

It is open to the public as an eighteenth-century historic house museum and is owned by Montgomery County.
