= Pottstown Area Rapid Transit =

Public transit agency in Pottstown

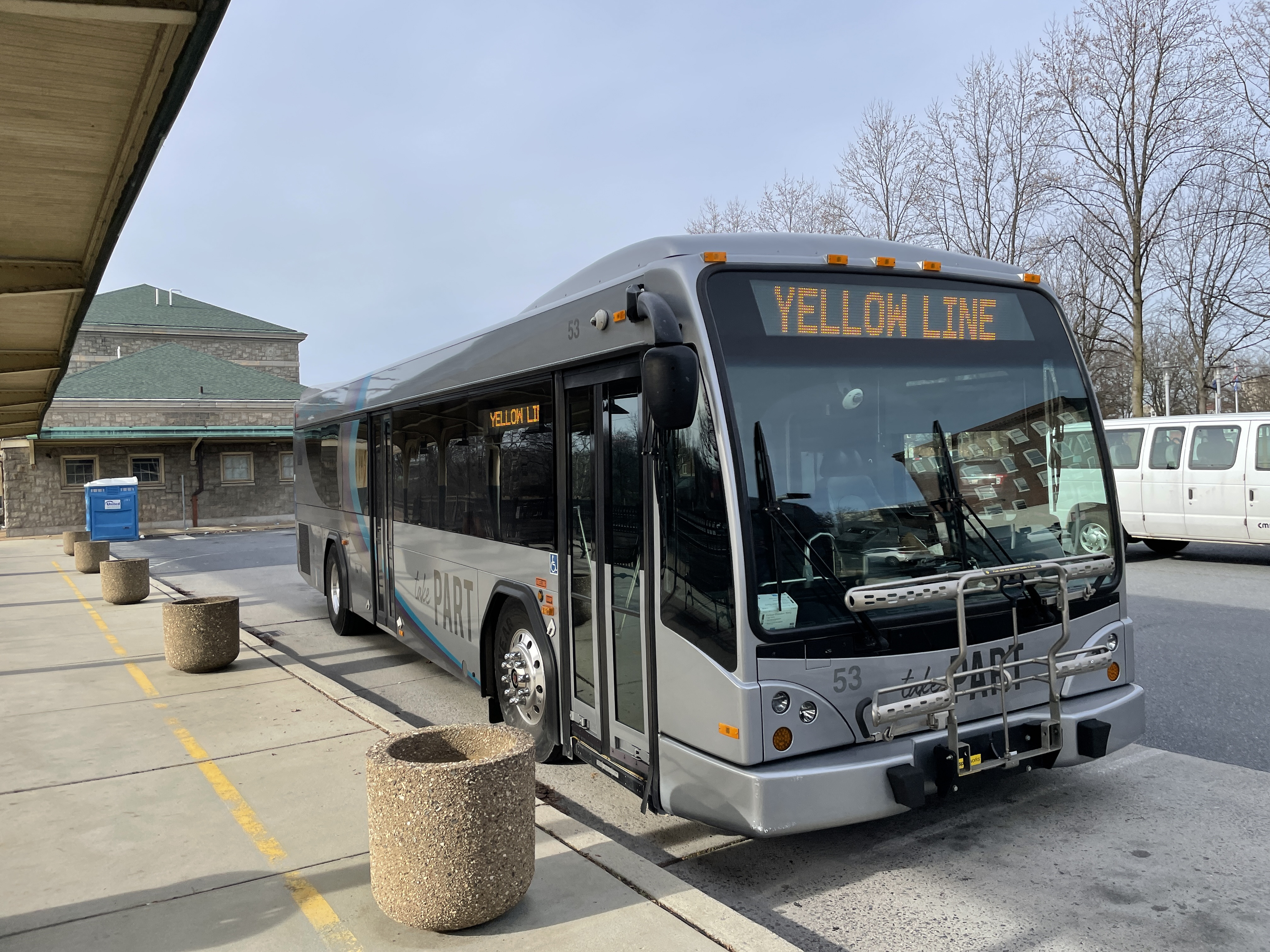
- PART bus 53 at the Charles W. Dickinson Transportation Center on the Yellow Line
- Headquarters: 902 Farmington Avenue; Pottstown, Pennsylvania, 19464, U.S.
- Service area: Pottstown, Pennsylvania
- Service type: Bus service
- Routes: 5
- Hubs: Charles W. Dickinson Transportation Center
- Fleet: 9 buses
- Website: http://www.pottstownarearapidtransit.com

Pottstown Area Rapid Transit (PART) is a public transit agency providing bus service in the Pottstown, Pennsylvania, area. It is owned by the borough of Pottstown and runs Monday through Saturday, excluding major holidays. PART provides a connection to SEPTA's Route 93 bus, which runs from Pottstown to Norristown. In addition to fixed routes, the agency also operates a paratransit service for disabled people.

== Routes ==
All of PART's routes are loop routes that originate and terminate at the Charles W. Dickinson Transportation Center located at the intersection of High Street and Hanover Street in downtown Pottstown.

Line Name	Places Served
Blue Line	High Street, Pottstown Hospital, Sanatoga Village Shopping Center, Hilltop, Philadelphia Premium Outlets, Costco, Hilltop, Sanatoga Village Shopping Center, Pottstown Memorial Medical Center, High Street
Purple Line	Hanover Street, North End Shopping Center, Rolling Hills, Sanatoga Village Shopping Center, Pottstown Hospital, Sanatoga Village Shopping Center, Rolling Hills, North End Shopping Center
Yellow Line	Home Depot, Pottstown Hospital, YMCA, North End Shopping Center, YMCA
Green Line	The Shoppes at Coventry, Montgomery County Community College West Campus, High Street, Stowe, Pottstown Center, State Street, Upland Square Shopping Center, Hanover Street
Orange Line	Pottstown Center, Upland Square Shopping Center, Boyertown Shopping Center, Douglass Town Center, Gilbertsville Shopping Center, Gilbertsville, Upland Square Shopping Center, Pottstown Center

== Fares ==
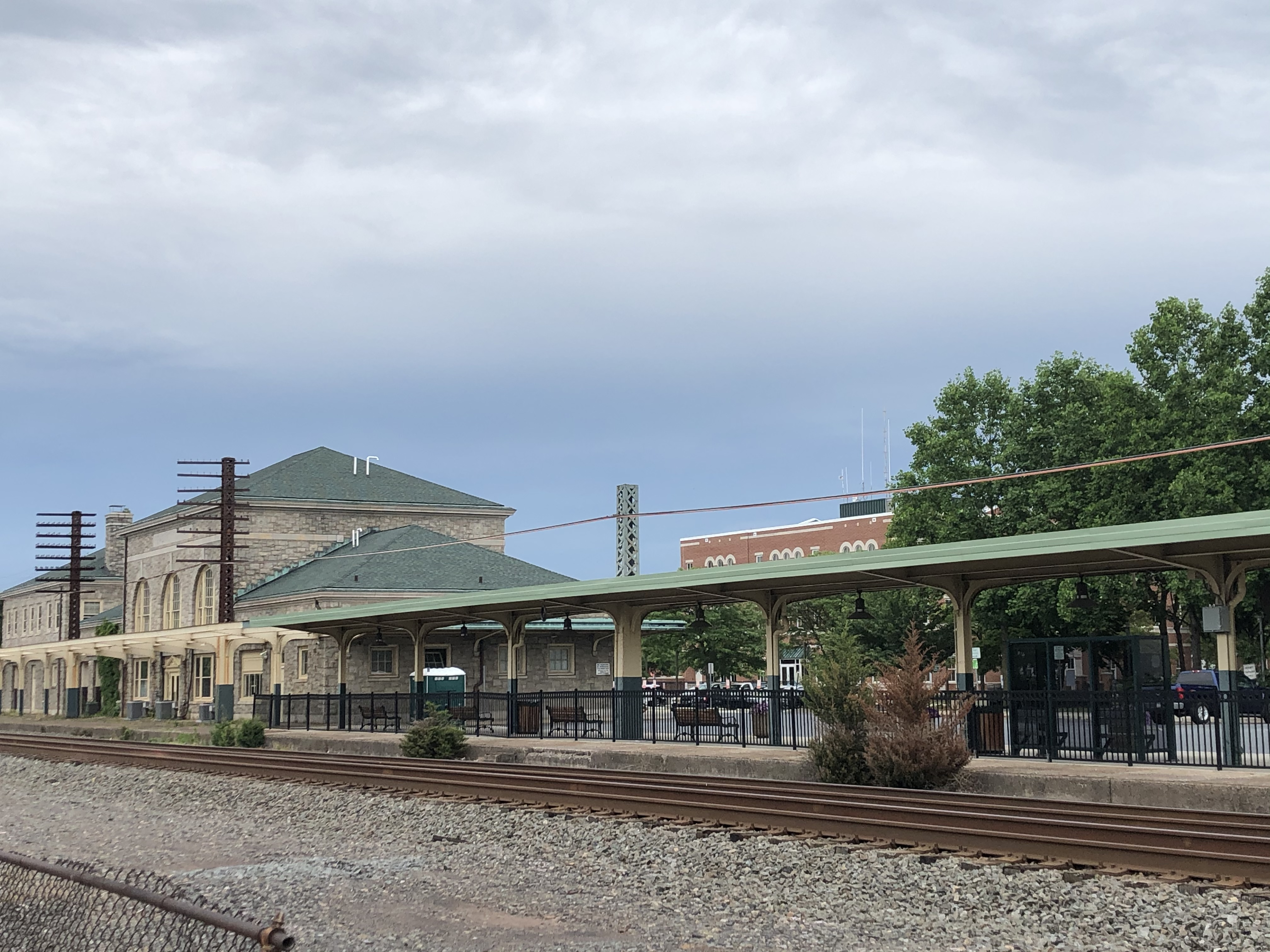
The Charles W. Dickinson Transportation Center, where all PART buses originate, formerly the Pottstown train station

The base fare to ride on PART buses is $2.50, which must be paid in cash with exact change. A discounted fare of $1.25 is available for students with a valid ID. Persons with disabilities and Medicare Card holders may ride PART for $1.25 with a valid half-fare card. Senior citizens who are age 65 or older may ride PART for free with a valid Transit ID or Medicare Card. Up to two children under fare box height can ride for free with a fare-paying adult; additional children may ride for $0.25 each. Transfers between routes are available for $1.00 and must be used within 90 minutes of being purchased.

PART offers Multi-Ride and Round-Trip passes that can be purchased at Pottstown borough hall. The Multi-Ride Pass costs $25.00 for full-fare, $12.00 for half-fare, and $10.00 for transfer. The Round-Trip Pass costs $5.00 for full-fare, $2.50 for half-fare, and $2.00 for transfer.

The fare for PART's paratransit service is $5.00.

== Fleet ==
=== Current ===
Fleet number(s)	Year	Manufacturer	Model	Engine	Transmission
51-55	2019	Gillig	Low Floor BRT 35'	Cummins L9	Allison B400R
57-58	2021	Gillig	Low Floor BRT 35'	Cummins L9	Allison B400R
