= Anthracite Railway =

Short line railroad in Pennsylvania, USA

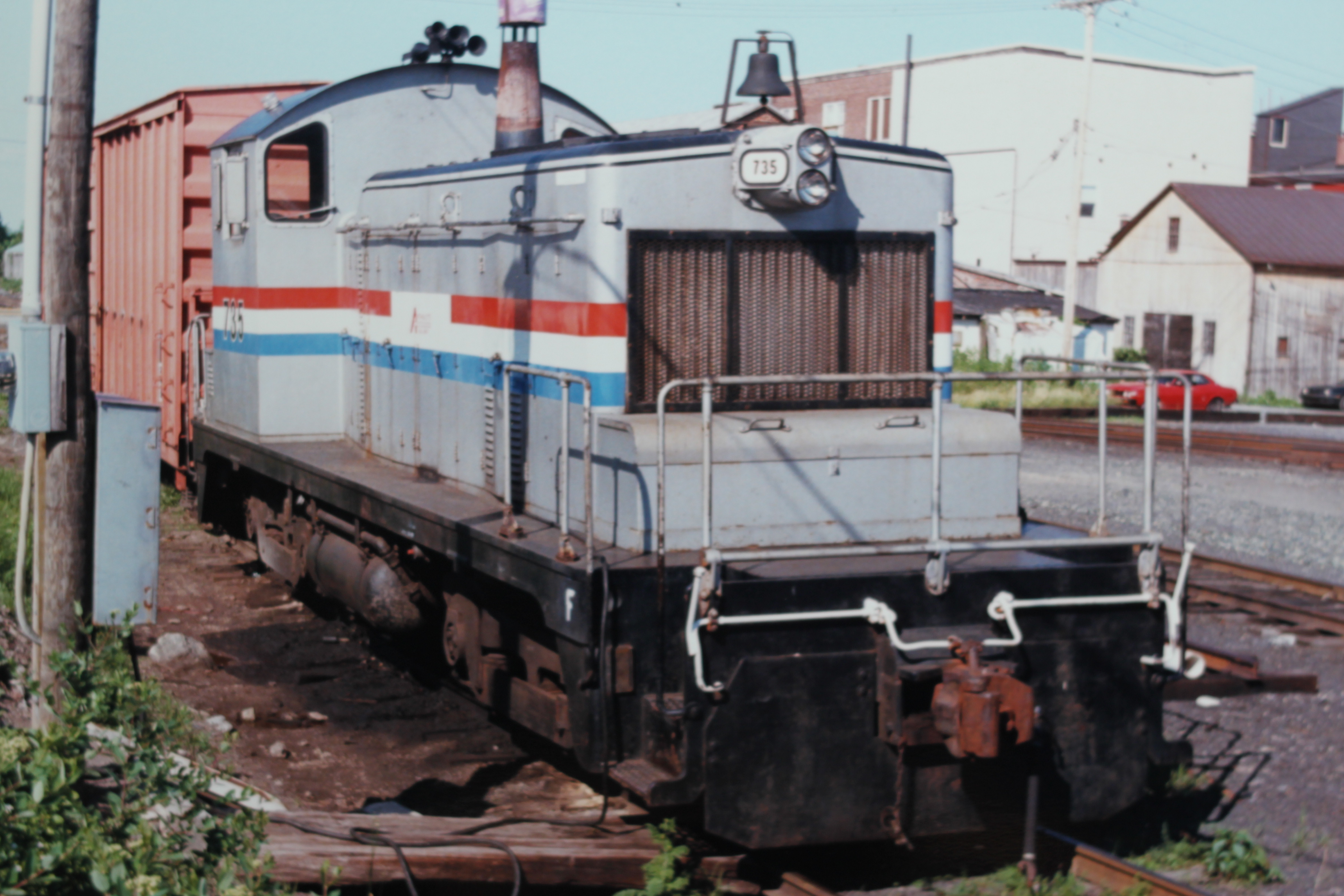
- Anthracite Railway EMD SW1 No. 735 at Boyertown in 1987

Overview
- Headquarters: Pennsburg, Pennsylvania
- Reporting mark: ATRW
- Dates of operation: 1983–1989

The Anthracite Railway (reporting mark ATRW) was a short line railroad in the state of Pennsylvania. It was formed in 1983 to operate various former Reading Company lines that it leased from the state. The Reading Blue Mountain and Northern Railroad took over the leases in 1988–1989.

== Lines ==
The Anthracite Railway operated three railway lines. All three were former Reading Company lines:

- the Allentown Branch, between Topton and Kutztown
- the Colebrookdale Branch, between Pottstown and Boyertown
- the Perkiomen Branch, between Pennsburg and Emmaus

The company commenced operations on July 31, 1983, succeeding Conrail as operator. Pennsylvania owned all three lines. The Reading Blue Mountain and Northern Railroad replaced the Anthracite Railway as the operator of the Perkiomen Branch in 1988 and the other two branches in 1989.
