= Pottstown Municipal Airport =

- IATA: none; ICAO: none; FAA LID: N47

Summary
- Airport type: Public
- Owner/Operator: Borough of Pottstown
- Serves: Pottstown, Pennsylvania, U.S.
- Elevation AMSL: 256 ft / 78 m
- Coordinates: 40°15′37″N 075°40′15″W
- Website: Official website

Maps
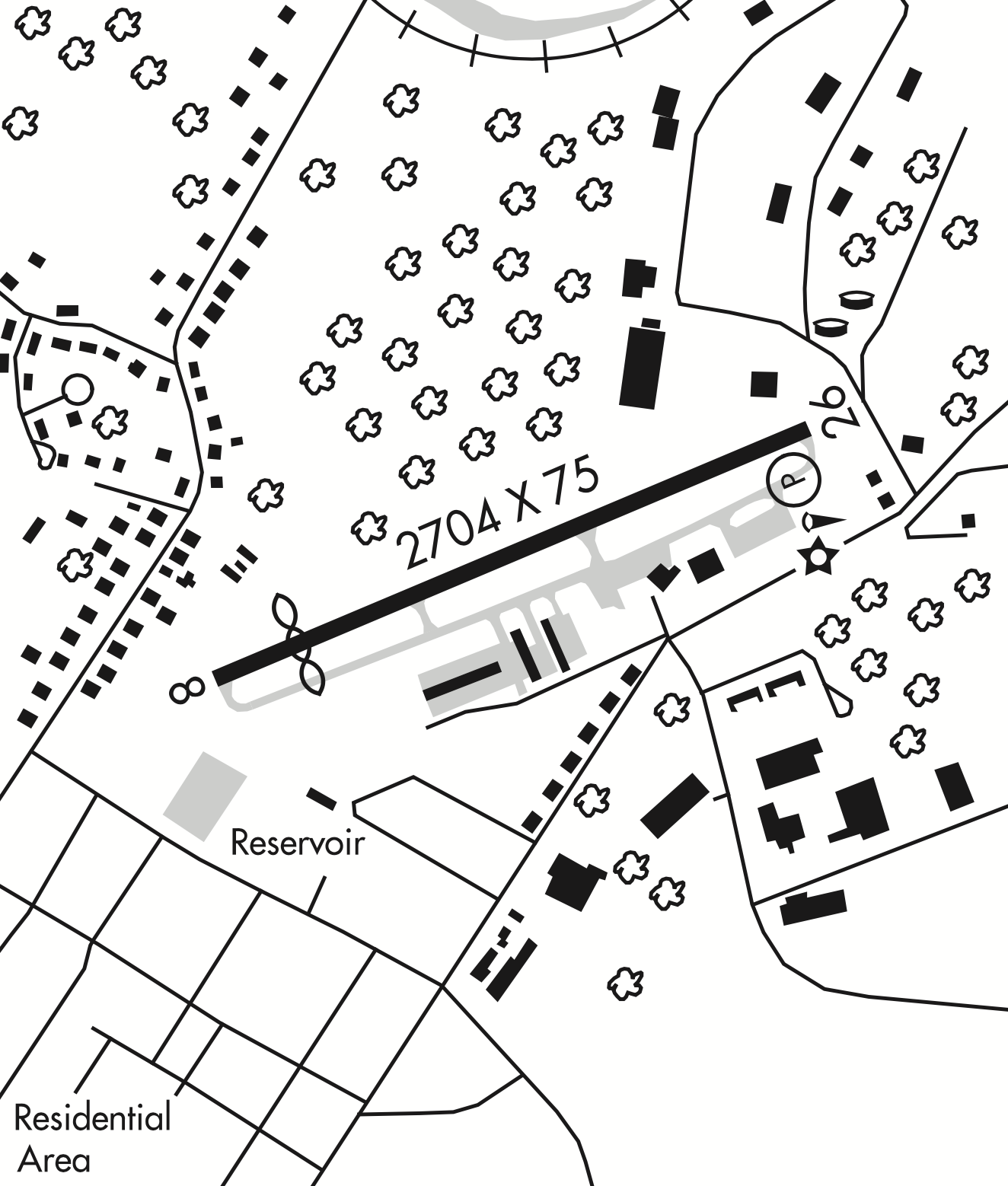

- Location of Pottstown Municipal Airport in Pennsylvania N47 (the United States)

Runways
Direction	Length		Surface
Direction	ft	m	Surface
8/26	2,704	824	Asphalt

Statistics (2008)
- Aircraft operations: 24,687
- Based aircraft: 62
- Source: Federal Aviation Administration

Pottstown Municipal Airport (FAA LID: N47) is a public use airport located in Montgomery County, Pennsylvania, United States. It is owned by the Borough of Pottstown and located two nautical miles (3.7 km) northwest of Pottstown's central business district.

Witmer's Aircraft Service offered a full suite of aircraft maintenance and repair services. Founded in 1992, Witmer's Aircraft Service was based at N47 for more than 10 years. Witmer's service is now operated by Pasquale Aviation.

== History ==
=== 20th century ===
In 1946, John Basco and Charles Novack purchased the land now occupied by the airport. Construction of the buildings began a year later, in 1947, and an Open House was held on September 26, 1948. The airport was originally referred to as Stowe Airport or Basco's Airport. A 2,700-foot (820 m)-long runway was built in 1961, and a parallel taxiway was built in 1965. During the 1980s a business park was added.

=== 21st century ===
As part of the federal Airport Improvement Program, the airport began multiple projects over the last few years. In 2003, as part of these initiatives, a new hangar was completed. The fuel farm tanks were refinished in December 2005. The apron and taxiway was repaved in the spring of 2007.

== Facilities and aircraft ==
Pottstown Municipal Airport covers an area of 63 acres (25 ha) at an elevation of 256 feet (78 m) above mean sea level. It has one asphalt paved runway designated 8/26 which measures 2,704 by 75 feet (824 x 23 m).

For the 12-month period ending September 9, 2008, the airport had 24,687 aircraft operations, an average of 67 per day: 96% general aviation, 4% air taxi and <1% military. At that time there were 62 aircraft based at this airport: 97% single-engine and 3% multi-engine.

== See also ==
- List of airports in Pennsylvania
