= Colebrookdale Railroad =

Heritage railroad based in Pennsylvania

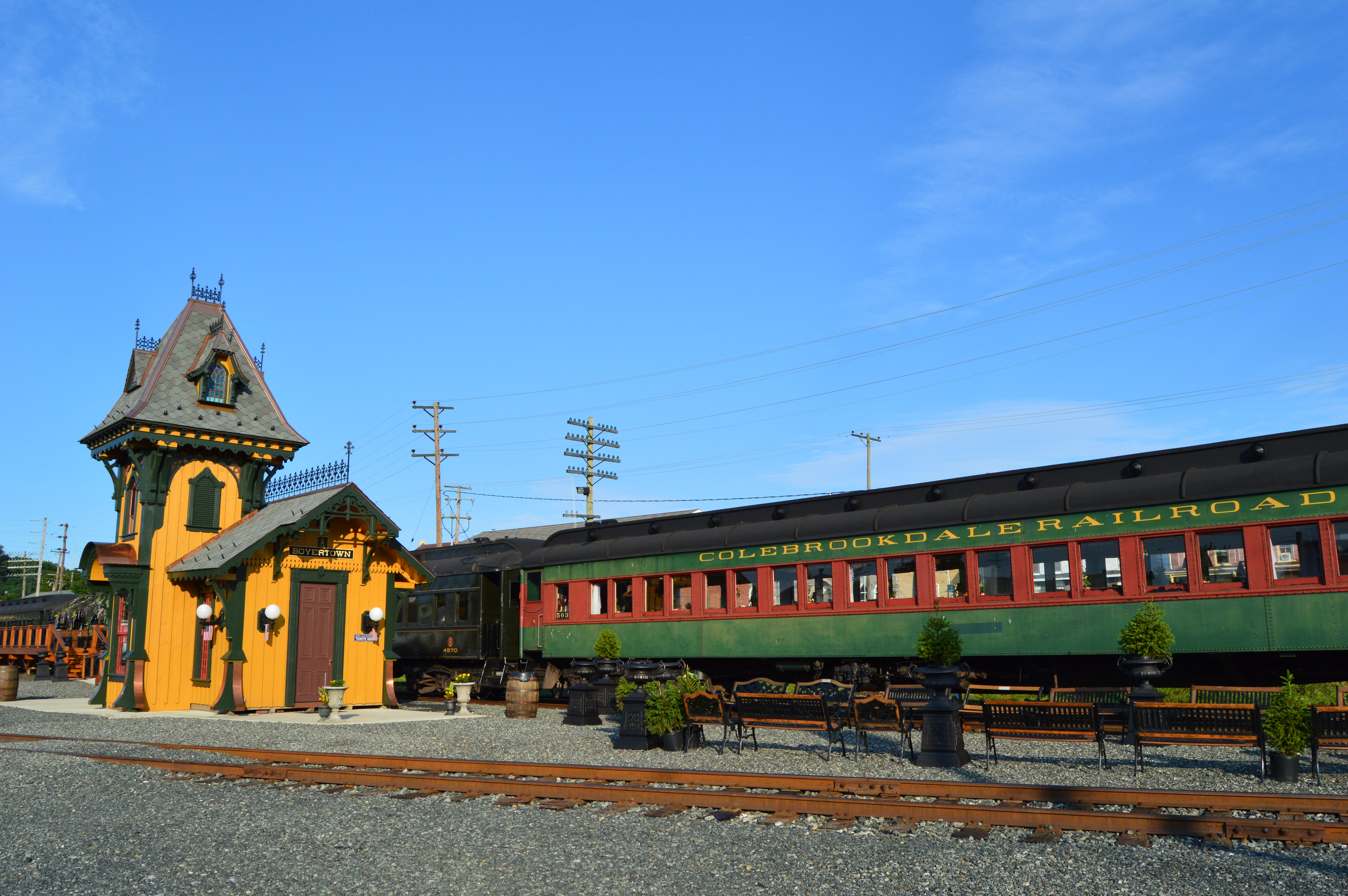
- The Colebrookdale Railroad Boyertown station and passenger train in August 2017

Overview
- Headquarters: Boyertown, Pennsylvania
- Reporting mark: EBGX
- Locale: Boyertown-Pottstown, Pennsylvania
- Dates of operation: 2014–present
- Predecessor: East Penn Railroad

Technical
- Track gauge: 4 ft 8 1/2 in (1,435 mm) standard gauge
- Length: 8.6 miles (13.8 km)

Other
- Website: www.colebrookdalerailroad.com

The Colebrookdale Railroad (reporting mark EBGX), also known as the Secret Valley Line or colloquially as The Colebrookdale, is a tourist railroad located in Boyertown, Pennsylvania. The railroad operates between Boyertown in Berks County and Pottstown in Montgomery County on former Reading Company trackage.

== Operations ==
The Colebrookdale Railroad operates a variety of excursions originating out of Boyertown, with plans eventually to have trains originating serving Pottstown as well. Current services include a fall foliage train, Haunted History train, Santa Claus train, Valentine's Day train, Easter Bunny Express, Wine Tasting and Cheese Train, and Mother's Day and Father's Day trains. The railroad also allows groups to charter the entire train, or select cars, and to rent the caboose for birthday parties.

The Colebrookdale currently operates a consist of 5 train cars: deluxe coach, dining car, cafe car, lounge car, and parlor car. The fifth passenger car entered service in mid-November 2020 and is a cross between a parlor car and a coach car. The deluxe coach and parlor car are fully restored with their final interiors but the dining and cafe cars have yet to receive their final restoration.

The railroad also owns an open-air gondola and a PRR caboose. Other cars not yet restored include a private car named Voiture Lynnewood, a baggage car that will eventually serve as a child entertainment center for the train, and an immigrant sleeper named The Beaver currently stored at the railroad's restoration shops. These three cars are not planned to be restored at the present time, but may be evaluated as time and resources become available.

== History ==
The original Colebrookdale Railroad started building the railroad line between Boyertown and Pottstown in 1865 to serve the iron ore industry along the Manatawny Creek. Passenger and freight service began on September 6, 1869. The line originally continued further north to Bechtelsville and Barto before eventually being cut back to Boyertown. The Colebrookdale Railroad was later leased by the Reading, who operated the line until 1976 when it became a part of Conrail. Conrail planned to abandon the line, but the Pennsylvania Department of Transportation acquired the line and hired contracted operators to continue providing freight service. The branch was at various points operated by the Anthracite Railway, the Blue Mountain & Reading Railroad, and Penn Eastern Rail Lines. In March 2001, Berks County acquired the line for $155,000 to keep it active; the line was soon sold to Penn Eastern Rail Lines. The Colebrookdale Branch was abandoned by the East Penn Railroad (the successor to Penn Eastern Rail Lines) in 2008.

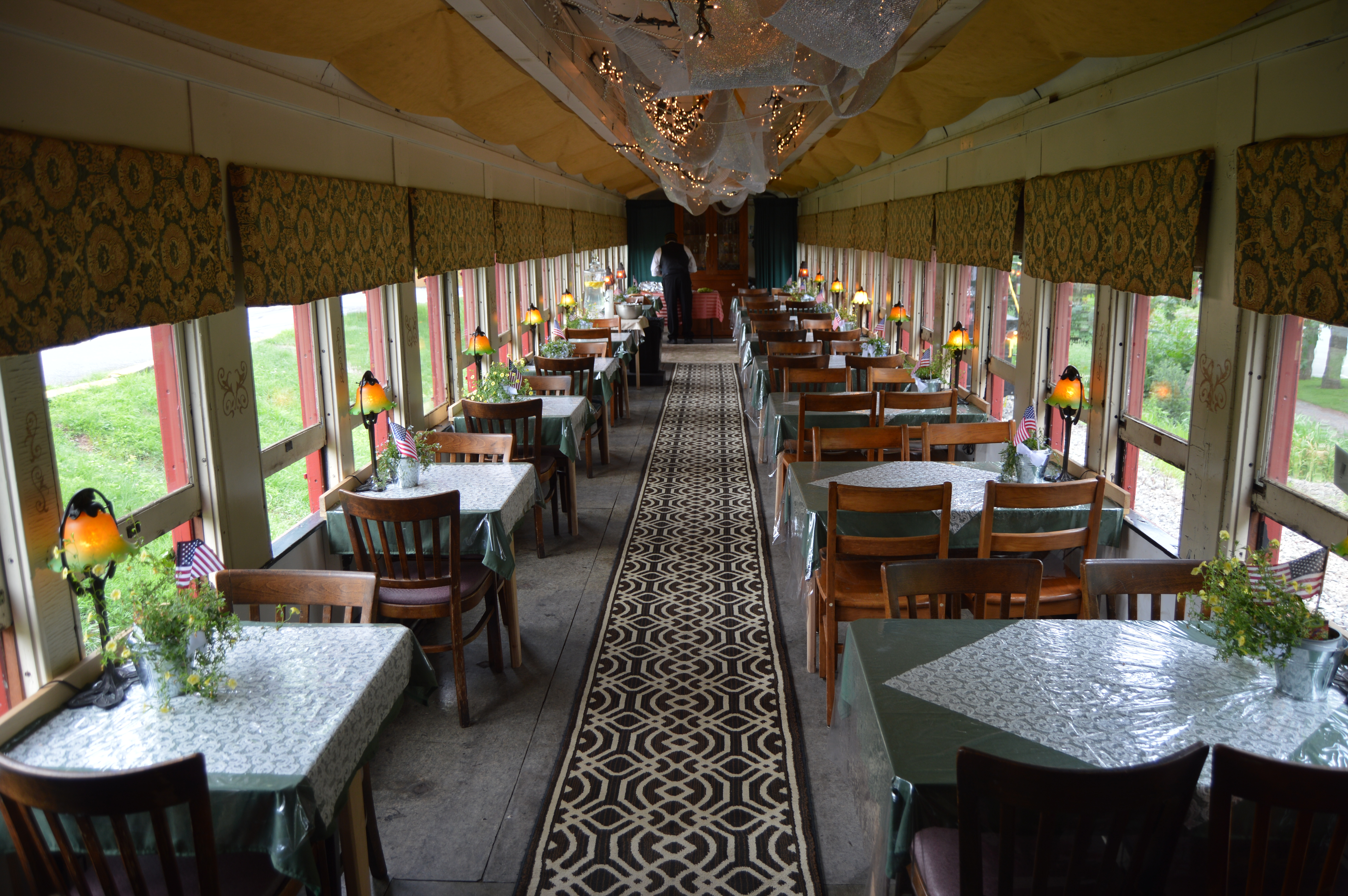
The Garden Cafe dining car on June 25, 2015

The Berks County Redevelopment Authority reactivated the line, with the Eastern Berks Gateway Railroad appointed to operate freight service on the line beginning in October 2010. Tourist passenger operations began in early October 2014 with a series of "soft" trips, intended to work out any operational issues before the first full season in 2015. The Colebrookdale Railroad began regular tourist service on October 18, 2014.

The company's non-profit parent, the Colebrookdale Railroad Preservation Trust, was working to further develop freight traffic on the line. However, some business had to be turned away because the physical plant of the line had deteriorated past the point of accepting certain heavier railcars. In early 2020, the railroad operators requested $25 million from the county government for infrastructure improvements. A $40 million loan from the Federal Railroad Administration was instead approved starting in 2022 to completely rebuild the line and extend it to Bechtelsville.

As of 2022, the railroad has acquired three steam locomotives as part of their future steam program. In addition, the railroad is currently redeveloping their yard for more space to store their equipment, and is reconfiguring their main property in Boyertown into an Edwardian garden that will serve a variety of community events, as well as additional parking spaces.

In July 2026 the railroad was awarded a $25 million USD grant from the U.S. Department of Transportation for infrastructure improvements. The funded projects include separation of freight and heritage operations, track rehabilitation, construction of a train shed, and a pedestrian connection between the railroad and local transit.

== Equipment ==
=== Locomotives ===
Locomotive details
Number	Image	Type	Model	Built	Builder	Status
9		Diesel	MDT	1964	Plymouth Locomotive Works	Operational
18		Steam	2-8-0	1910	American Locomotive Company	Undergoing 1,472-day inspection and overhaul
5030		Steam	4-6-2	1912	Baldwin Locomotive Works	Stored in Jackson, Michigan, awaiting transport to Pennsylvania
5288		Steam	4-6-2	1918	Montreal Locomotive Works	Display, awaiting restoration
5128		Diesel	GP38-2	1974	Electro-Motive Diesel	Operational
7236		Diesel	GP9	1959	Electro-Motive Diesel	Operational

=== Former units ===
Locomotive details
Number	Image	Type	Model	Built	Builder	Status	Owner
M-55		Railcar	Doodlebug	1930	Electro-Motive Diesel	Operational	Nevada Northern Railway
2627		Diesel	CF7	1946	Electro-Motive Diesel	Used for parts	Minnesota Transportation Museum
7580		Diesel	GP10	1957	Electro-Motive Diesel	Operational	Clinton Terminal Railroad
