= Heritage Field (airport) =

Airport in Pennsylvania

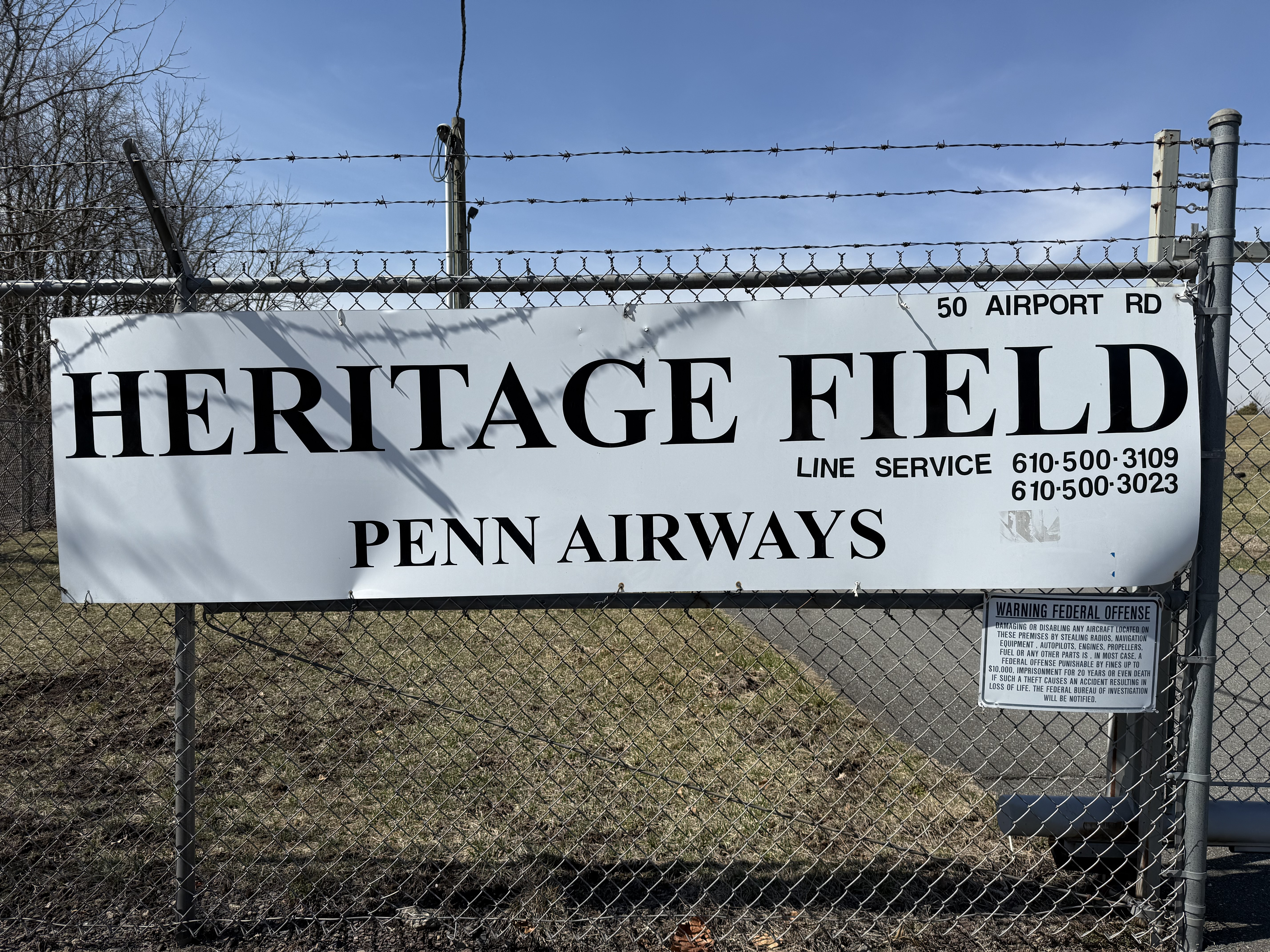
- IATA: PTW; ICAO: KPTW; FAA LID: PTW

Summary
- Airport type: Public use
- Owner: Limerick Aviation LP
- Operator: Pitcairn Aviation, LLC
- Serves: Pottstown, Pennsylvania
- Location: Limerick Township
- Elevation AMSL: 308 ft (94 m)
- Coordinates: 40°14′22″N 075°33′24″W
- Website: www.heritagefield.org

Map
- Location of airport in Pennsylvania PTW (the United States)

Runways
Direction	Length		Surface
Direction	ft	m	Surface
10/28	3,371	1,027	Asphalt

Statistics (2023)
- Aircraft operations (year ending 1/24/2023): 23,400
- Based aircraft: 105
- Source: Federal Aviation Administration

Heritage Field (IATA: PTW, ICAO: KPTW, FAA LID: PTW) is a public use airport in Montgomery County, Pennsylvania, United States. It is located three nautical miles (6 km) east of Pottstown, in Limerick Township. The airport is privately owned by Limerick Aviation LP.

Previously known as Pottstown Limerick Airport, the airport was sold in 2009 by its former owner, the Exelon Generation Company, which also owned the nearby Limerick Nuclear Power Plant. It is now referred as Heritage Field on the local UNICOM.

This is included in the National Plan of Integrated Airport Systems for 2011–2015, which categorized it as a general aviation reliever airport.

== Facilities and aircraft ==
Heritage Field covers an area of 220 acres (89 ha) at an elevation of 308 feet (94 m) above mean sea level. It has one runway designated 10/28 with an asphalt surface measuring 3,371 by 75 feet (1,027 x 23 m).

Pitcairn Aviation LLC is the sole fixed-base operator located on the field.

For the 12-month period ending January 24, 2023, the airport had 23,400 aircraft operations, an average of 64 per day: 89% general aviation, 11% air taxi, and <1% military. At that time there were 105 aircraft based at this airport: 88 single-engine, 10 multi-engine, 1 jet, 4 helicopter, 1 glider, and 1 ultralight.

== See also ==
- List of airports in Pennsylvania
