= Pottstown, Pennsylvania =

Borough in Pennsylvania, US

Pottstown
- Borough
- Borough of Pottstown
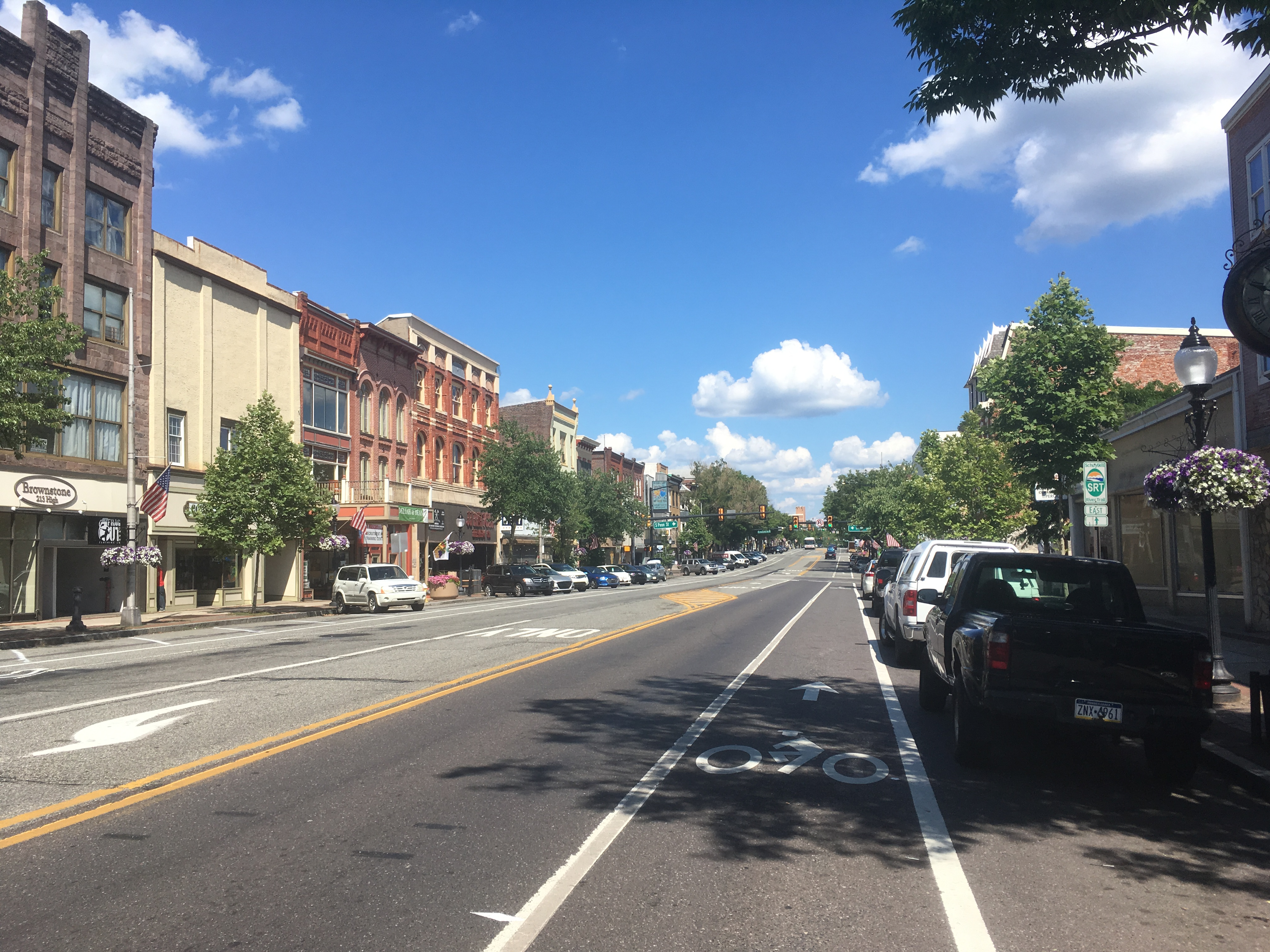
- High Street in Pottstown, June 2020

- Flag Seal

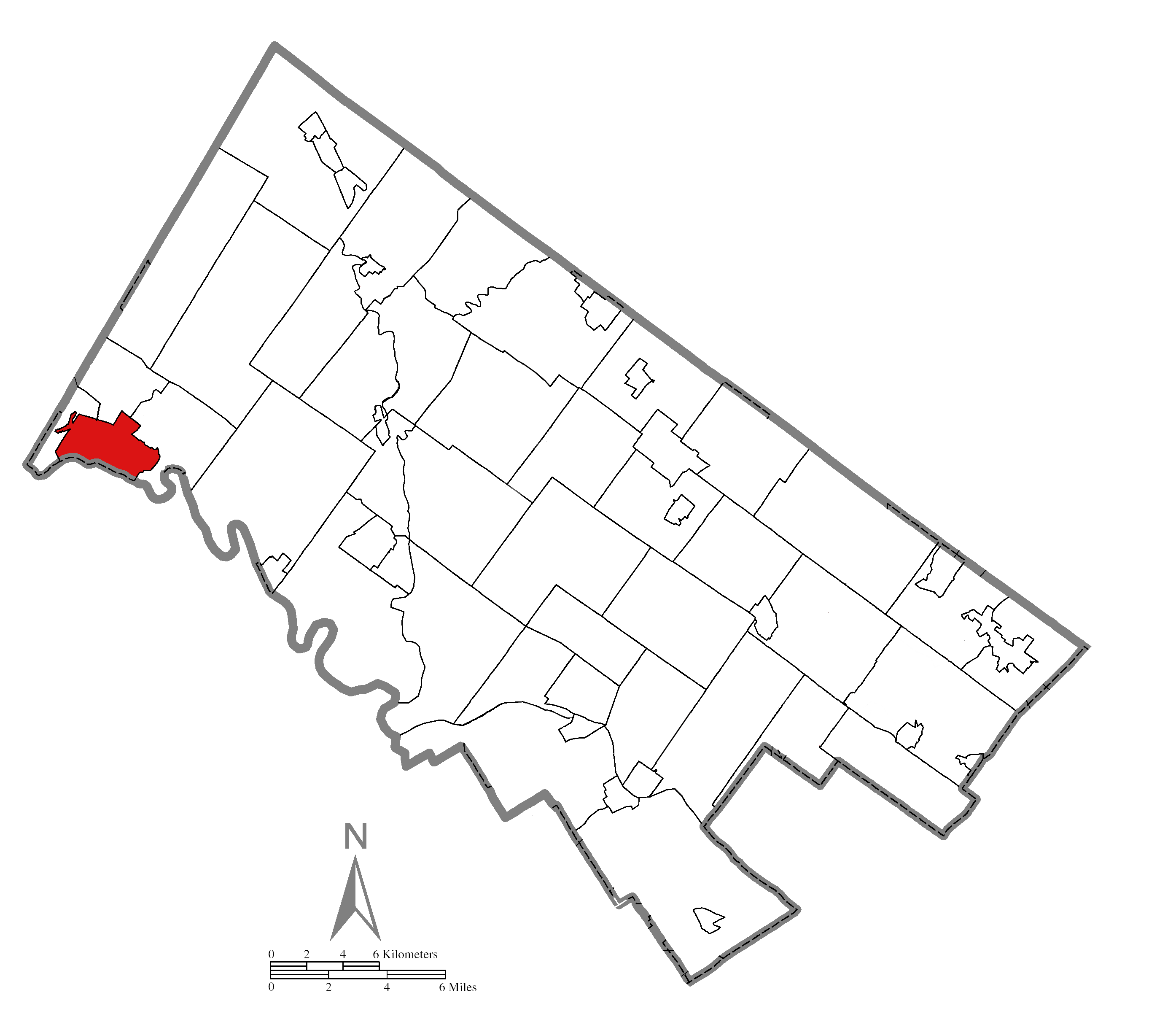
- Location of Pottstown in Montgomery County, Pennsylvania.

- Location of Pottstown in Pennsylvania Pottstown (the United States)
- Coordinates: 40°14′59″N 75°38′25″W
- Country: United States
- State: Pennsylvania
- County: Montgomery
- Founded: 1752
- Incorporated: February 6, 1815

Government
  - Type: Council-manager
  - Mayor: Stephanie A. Henrick
  - Borough Manager: Justin Keller

Area
  - Total: 4.94 sq mi (12.79 km^{2})
  - Land: 4.85 sq mi (12.57 km^{2})
  - Water: 0.085 sq mi (0.22 km^{2})
- Elevation: 203 ft (62 m)

Population (2020)
  - Total: 23,433
  - Density: 4,830.0/sq mi (1,864.88/km^{2})
- Time zone: UTC-5 (EST)
  - Summer (DST): UTC-4 (EDT)
- ZIP Codes: 19464-19465
- Area codes: 610 and 484
- FIPS code: 42-62416
- Website: http://www.pottstown.org

Pottstown is a borough in Montgomery County, Pennsylvania, United States. Pottstown was laid out in 1752–53 and named Pottsgrove in honor of its founder, John Potts. The old name was abandoned at the time of the incorporation as a borough in 1815. In 1888, the limits of the borough were considerably extended. Pottstown is the center of a productive farming and dairying region. As of the 2020 census, Pottstown had a population of 23,433.

Pottstown is located on the Schuylkill River. It is 29.1 miles (46.8 km) south of Allentown and 40.4 miles (65.0 km) northwest of Philadelphia. It is generally considered part of the Philadelphia metropolitan area.

== History ==
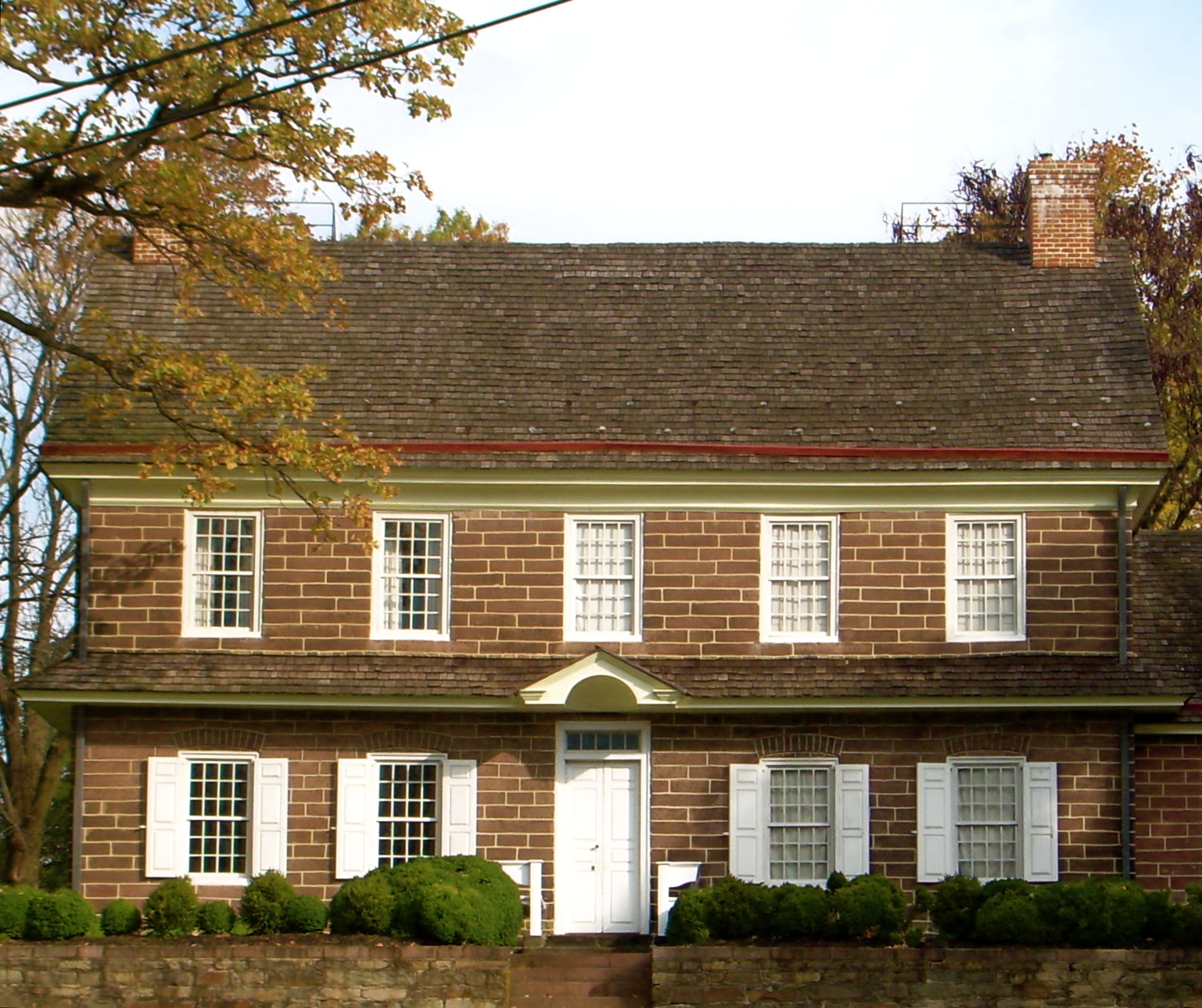
Pottsgrove Mansion, located on the west end of town, was the home of John Potts.

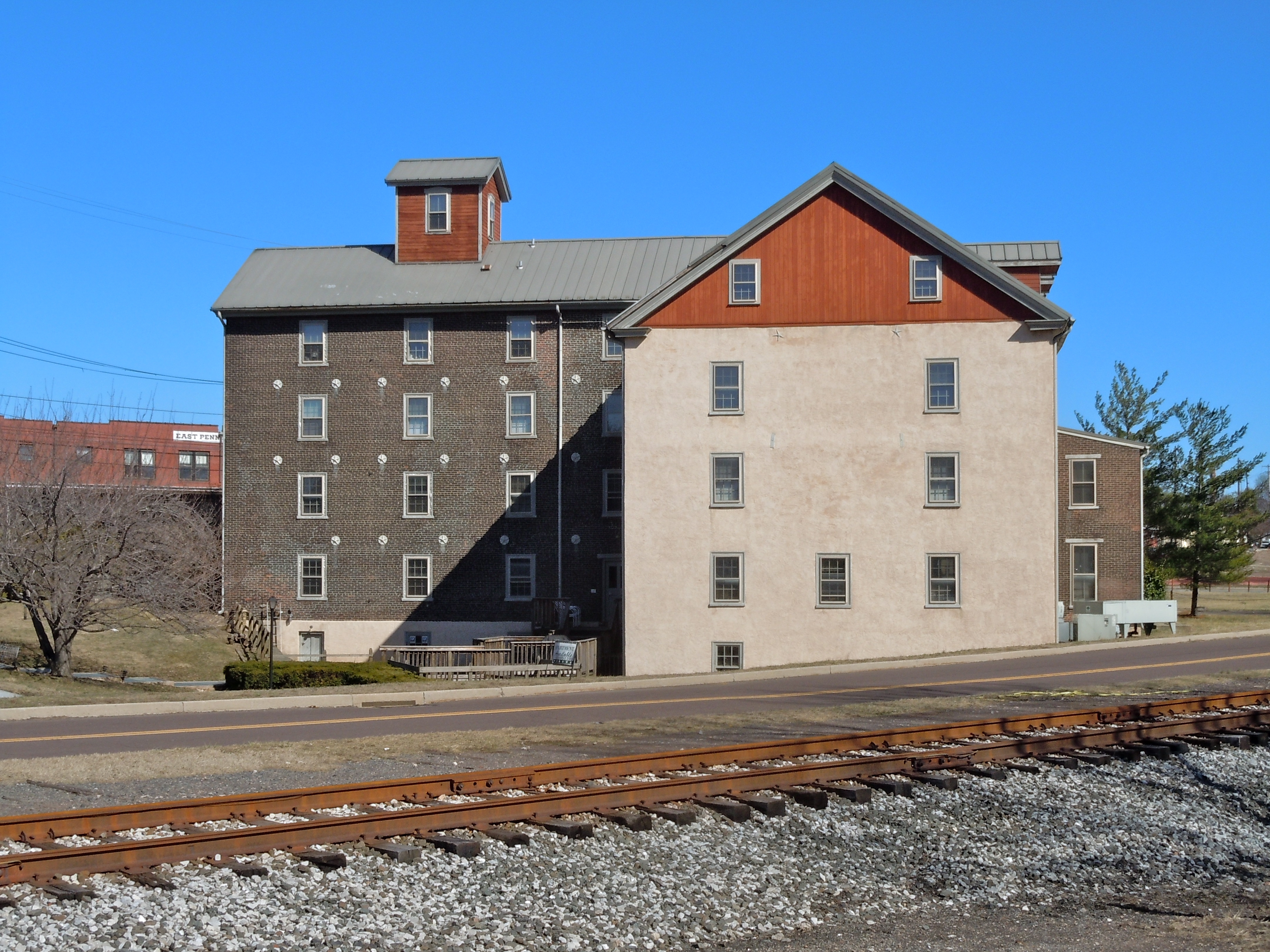
Pottstown Roller Mill, 1725

Modern-day Pottstown is on land originally deeded to William Penn. Germans, Swedes and English were among the area's first European settlers. After establishment of the first iron forge in 1714, Pottstown's fortunes became tied to the iron industry, and blast furnaces for production of iron and later steel eventually opened in the area.

Iron and steel production attracted the Potts family, iron masters by trade. They established a forge and built a large home just west of the Manatawny Creek. John Potts founded a town in 1761 on part of the 995 acres (4.03 km^{2}) that he owned. It is the home of the nation's oldest mill, Pottstown Roller Mill.

Pottsgrove grew, and in 1815 it was incorporated under the name Pottstown, becoming the second borough in Pennsylvania, after Norristown.

The Philadelphia & Reading Railroad mainline reached Pottstown in 1838. The extension of the railroad to Mount Carbon in 1842 facilitated the movement of raw materials and finished goods that helped Pottstown's economy grow. In a few years after the extension of the railroad, the population grew from 600 to 1,850. Pottstown's metal production grew; steel from the borough was used in the Panama Canal and Golden Gate Bridge.

In 1944, the borough adopted a city manager form of government. By 1964, the borough saw the need to reorganize the municipal government. At the time, it had one of the largest borough councils in the state, with 20 members. This was reduced to seven members in redrawn wards.

The High Street Historic District, Old Pottstown Historic District, Pottsgrove Mansion, Grubb Mansion, Jefferson Elementary School, Pottstown Roller Mill, Reading Railroad Pottstown Station, and Henry Antes House are on the National Register of Historic Places.

== Politics and government ==
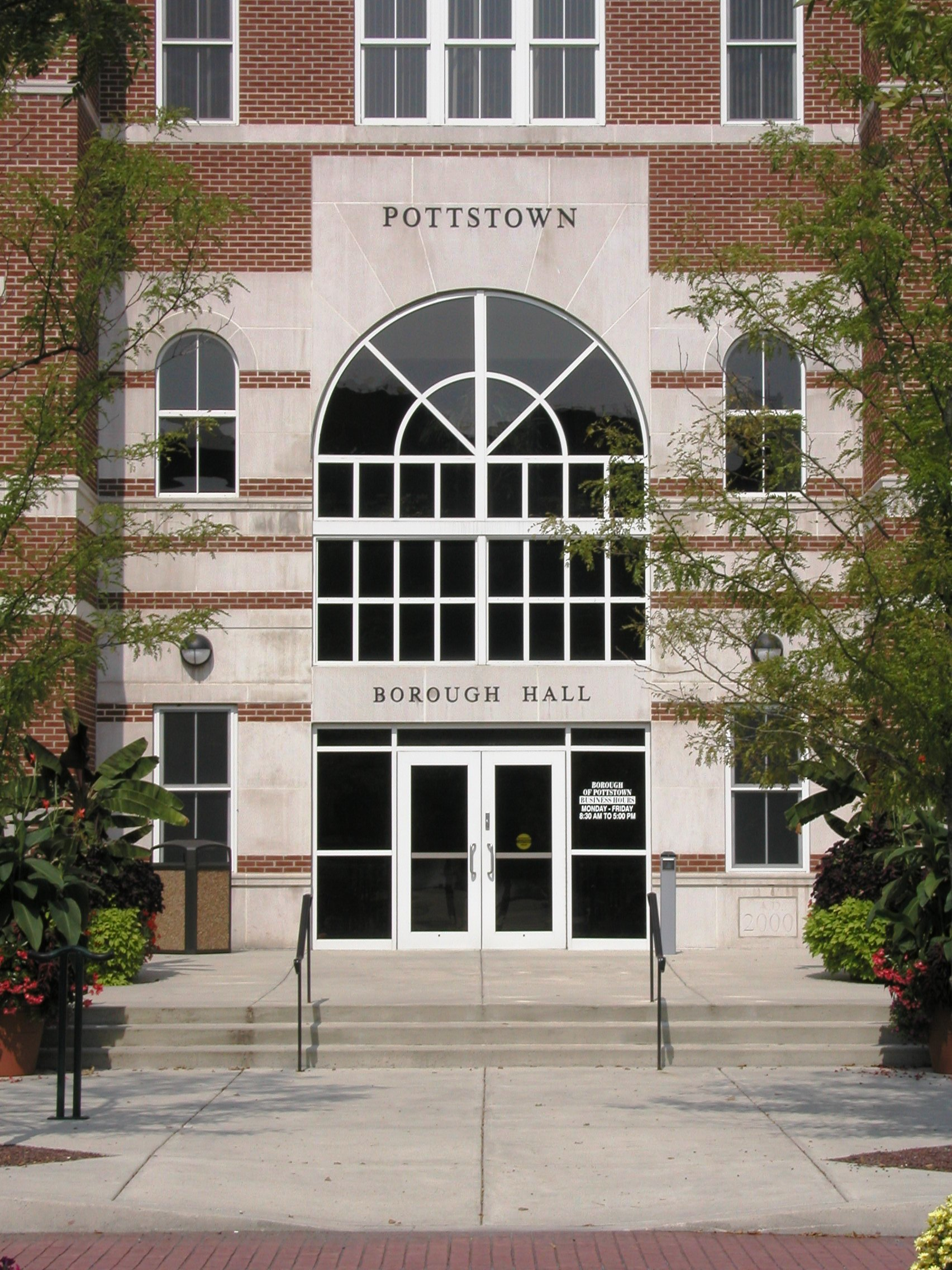
Pottstown borough hall entrance

Pottstown has a city manager form of government with a mayor and a seven-member borough council. The mayor is Stephanie A. Henrick and the borough manager is Justin Keller.

The borough is part of the Fourth Congressional District (represented by Democratic Rep. Madeleine Dean), the 146th State House District (represented by Democratic Rep. Joe Ciresi), and the 24th State Senate District (represented by Republican Sen. Tracy Pennycuick).

== Geography ==
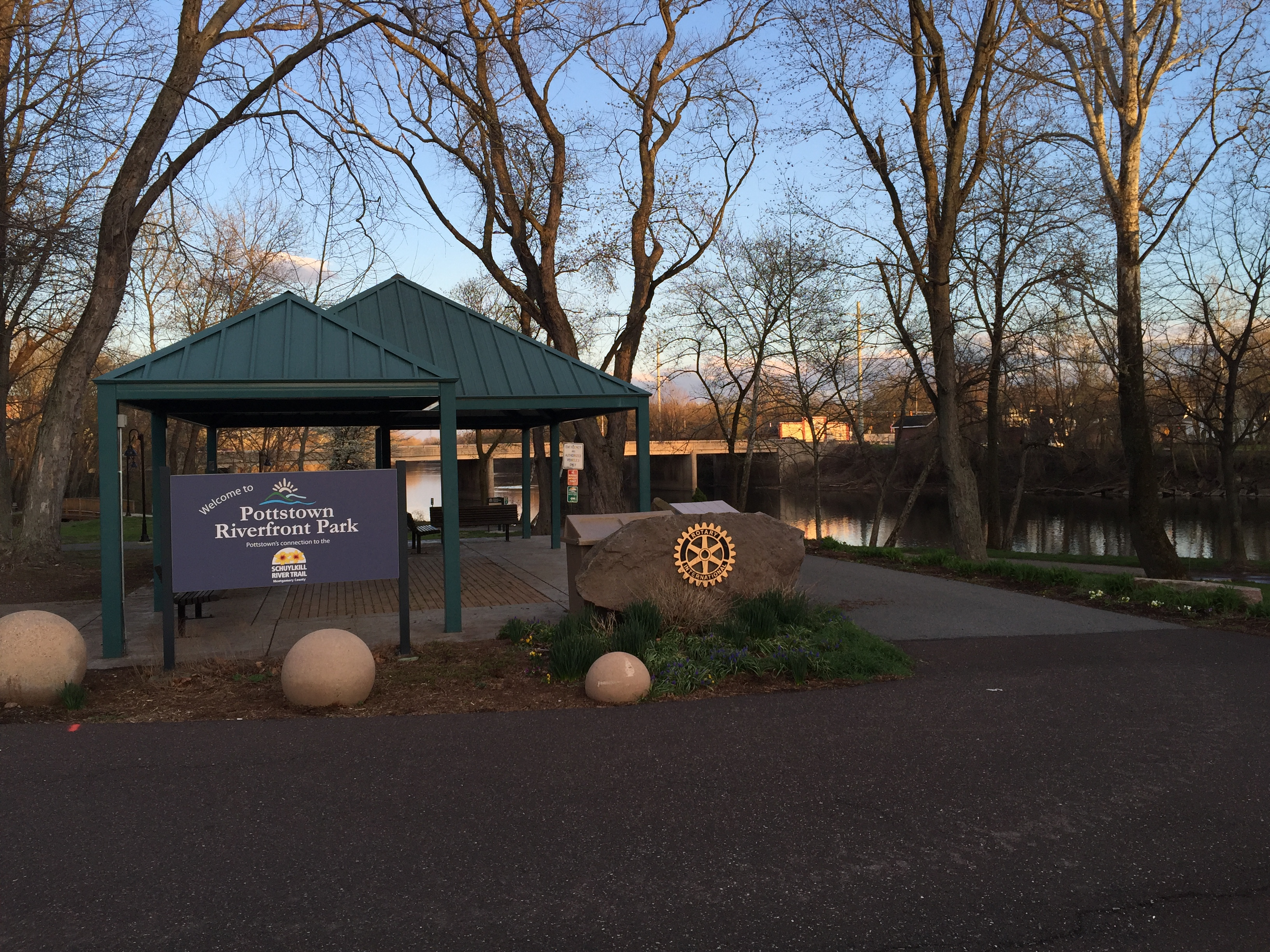
Schuylkill River Trail at the Pottstown Riverfront Park

Pottstown is located at 40°14′59″N 75°38′25″W (40.249690, -75.640262). According to the U.S. Census Bureau, the borough has a total area of 4.9 square miles (13 km^{2}), of which 4.8 square miles (12 km^{2}) is land and 0.1 square miles (0.26 km^{2}) or 1.83% is water.

=== Climate ===
The climate in this area is characterized by hot, humid summers and generally mild to cool winters. According to the Köppen Climate Classification system, Pottstown, Pennsylvania has a humid subtropical climate, abbreviated Cfa on climate maps. Using the freezing mark as a boundary (as is more common in the US), the climate was hot-summer humid continental (Dfa) with January averaging below freezing until the most recent temperature numbers. The hardiness zone is 7a. Heavy snowfall remains occasionally possible.

Pottstown lacks an official weather station as administered from the regional National Weather Service office in Mount Holly, New Jersey. Temperatures average a little higher than the closest official weather station serving Reading from Bern Township, Berks County due to the difference in latitude and elevation.

Climate data for Pottstown, Pennsylvania (Heritage Field Airport) 1991–2020 normals, extremes 1999–present
Month	Jan	Feb	Mar	Apr	May	Jun	Jul	Aug	Sep	Oct	Nov	Dec	Year
Record high °F (°C)	71 (22)	78 (26)	82 (28)	92 (33)	94 (34)	98 (37)	105 (41)	101 (38)	98 (37)	91 (33)	80 (27)	73 (23)	105 (41)
Mean daily maximum °F (°C)	37.4 (3.0)	40.4 (4.7)	49.1 (9.5)	61.3 (16.3)	71.0 (21.7)	79.3 (26.3)	83.8 (28.8)	81.5 (27.5)	74.6 (23.7)	63.3 (17.4)	52.4 (11.3)	42.1 (5.6)	61.4 (16.3)
Daily mean °F (°C)	29.7 (−1.3)	31.9 (−0.1)	39.8 (4.3)	50.7 (10.4)	60.4 (15.8)	69.1 (20.6)	74.0 (23.3)	71.9 (22.2)	64.7 (18.2)	53.3 (11.8)	43.0 (6.1)	34.4 (1.3)	51.9 (11.1)
Mean daily minimum °F (°C)	22.0 (−5.6)	23.4 (−4.8)	30.4 (−0.9)	40.0 (4.4)	49.9 (9.9)	58.9 (14.9)	64.2 (17.9)	62.2 (16.8)	54.8 (12.7)	43.3 (6.3)	33.7 (0.9)	26.7 (−2.9)	42.5 (5.8)
Record low °F (°C)	−7 (−22)	−2 (−19)	0 (−18)	21 (−6)	30 (−1)	40 (4)	48 (9)	47 (8)	34 (1)	25 (−4)	11 (−12)	0 (−18)	−7 (−22)
Average precipitation inches (mm)	3.02 (77)	2.56 (65)	4.07 (103)	3.64 (92)	3.69 (94)	3.84 (98)	4.72 (120)	4.38 (111)	4.83 (123)	3.81 (97)	3.02 (77)	3.76 (96)	45.34 (1,152)
Average precipitation days (≥ 0.01 in)	10.4	10.4	11.1	12.5	12.7	12.6	11.6	12.3	11.8	11.6	9.2	11.2	137.4
Source: NOAA

== Demographics ==
Historical population
Census	Pop.	Note	%±
1830	676		—
1840	721		6.7%
1850	1,664		130.8%
1860	2,380		43.0%
1870	4,125		73.3%
1880	5,305		28.6%
1890	13,285		150.4%
1900	13,696		3.1%
1910	15,599		13.9%
1920	17,431		11.7%
1930	19,430		11.5%
1940	20,194		3.9%
1950	22,589		11.9%
1960	26,144		15.7%
1970	25,355		−3.0%
1980	22,729		−10.4%
1990	21,831		−4.0%
2000	21,859		0.1%
2010	22,377		2.4%
2020	23,433		4.7%

Presidential elections results
Year	Republican	Democratic
2024	36.9% 3,875	61.5% 6,470
2020	35.1% 3,573	63.2% 6,429
2016	36.6% 3,245	58.3% 5,160
2012	33.3% 2,825	65.1% 5,527
2008	29.2% 2,737	69.5% 6,506
2004	38.0% 3,069	61.3% 4,950
2000	40.0% 2,459	56.1% 3,448

=== 2020 census ===
As of the 2020 census, Pottstown had a population of 23,433. The median age was 36.8 years. 23.4% of residents were under the age of 18 and 14.4% of residents were 65 years of age or older. For every 100 females there were 91.4 males, and for every 100 females age 18 and over there were 88.5 males age 18 and over.

100.0% of residents lived in urban areas, while 0.0% lived in rural areas.

There were 9,774 households in Pottstown, of which 27.4% had children under the age of 18 living in them. Of all households, 31.8% were married-couple households, 22.5% were households with a male householder and no spouse or partner present, and 35.4% were households with a female householder and no spouse or partner present. About 35.5% of all households were made up of individuals and 12.3% had someone living alone who was 65 years of age or older.

There were 10,689 housing units, of which 8.6% were vacant. The homeowner vacancy rate was 3.3% and the rental vacancy rate was 7.3%.

Racial composition as of the 2020 census
Race	Number	Percent
White	14,449	61.7%
Black or African American	5,149	22.0%
American Indian and Alaska Native	68	0.3%
Asian	262	1.1%
Native Hawaiian and Other Pacific Islander	13	0.1%
Some other race	1,038	4.4%
Two or more races	2,454	10.5%
Hispanic or Latino (of any race)	2,578	11.0%

=== 2010 census ===
As of the 2010 census, the borough was 72.1% White, 19.5% Black or African American, 0.3% Native American, 0.9% Asian, 0.1% Native Hawaiian, and 4.4% were two or more races. 8.0% of the population were of Hispanic or Latino ancestry.

=== 2000 census ===
As of the 2000 census, there were 21,859 people, 9,146 households, and 5,533 families residing in the borough. The population density was 4,526.3 people per square mile (1,747.6 people/km^{2}). There were 9,973 housing units at an average density of 2,065.1 per square mile (797.3/km^{2}). The racial makeup of the borough was 79.34% White, 15.06% African American, 0.23% Native American, 0.65% Asian, 0.09% Pacific Islander, 1.89% from other races, and 2.75% from two or more races. Hispanic or Latino of any race were 4.53% of the population.

There were 9,146 households, out of which 29.1% had children under the age of 18 living with them, 41.3% were married couples living together, 14.7% had a female householder with no husband present, and 39.5% were non-families. 33.5% of all households were made up of individuals, and 13.4% had someone living alone who was 65 years of age or older. The average household size was 2.36 and the average family size was 3.02.

In the borough, the population was spread out, with 25.6% under the age of 18, 7.5% from 18 to 24, 30.9% from 25 to 44, 19.8% from 45 to 64, and 16.2% who were 65 years of age or older. The median age was 36 years. For every 100 females, there were 90.5 males. For every 100 females age 18 and over, there were 85.6 males.

The median income for a household in the borough was $35,785, and the median income for a family was $45,734. Males had a median income of $34,923 versus $26,229 for females. The per capita income for the borough was $19,078. About 8.7% of families and 11.3% of the population were below the poverty line, including 15.2% of those under age 18 and 8.8% of those age 65 or over.

== Transportation ==
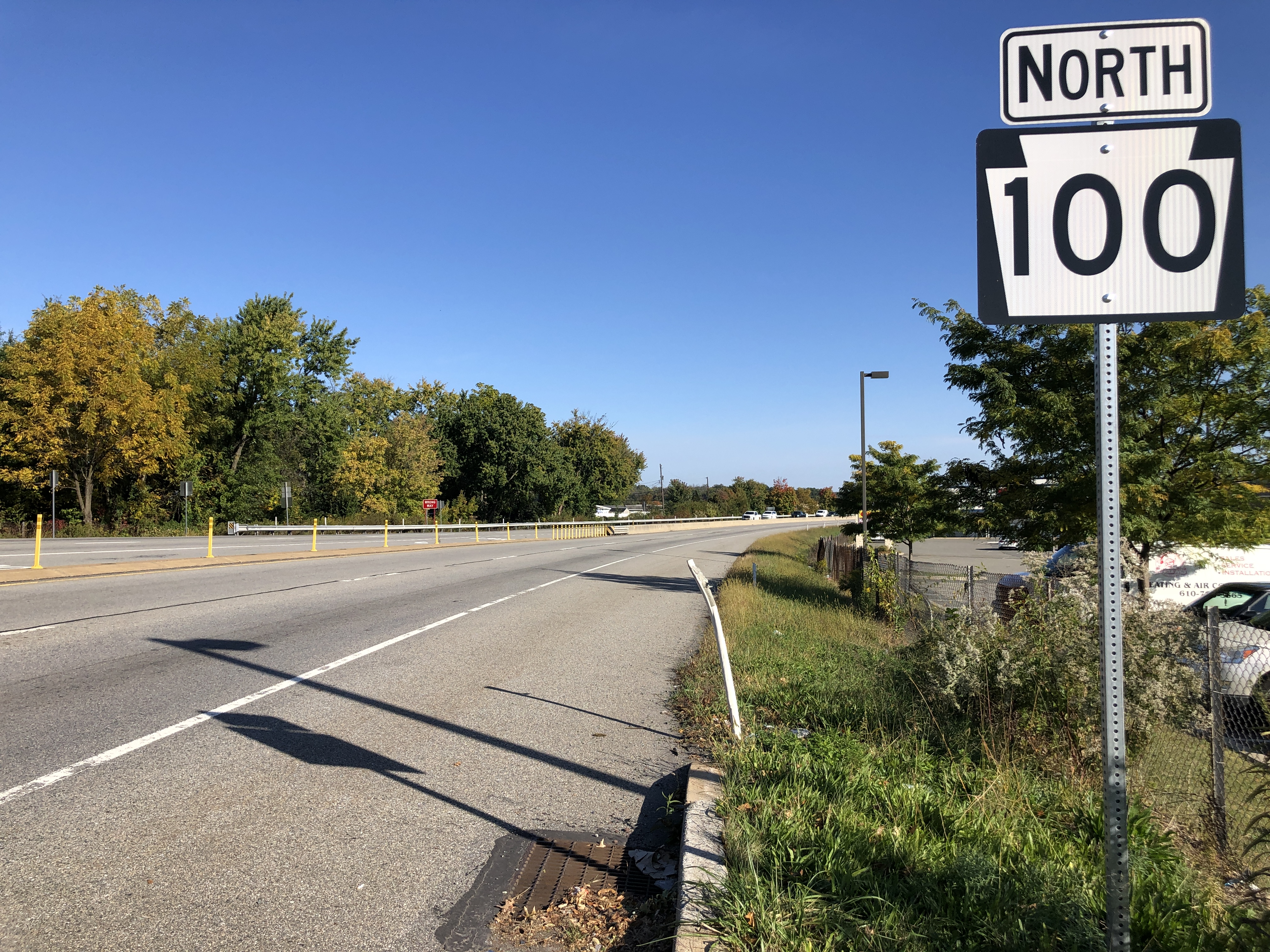
PA 100 northbound in Pottstown

As of 2018 there were 74.33 miles (119.62 km) of public roads in Pottstown, of which 12.85 miles (20.68 km) were maintained by the Pennsylvania Department of Transportation (PennDOT) and 61.48 miles (98.94 km) were maintained by the borough.

The main east–west street in Pottstown is High Street, which continues east of the borough as Ridge Pike. The main north–south street in the borough is Hanover Street. The U.S. Route 422 freeway passes to the south of Pottstown and heads east to King of Prussia and Philadelphia and west to Reading. Pennsylvania Route 100 runs north–south through the Pottstown area, heading south to West Chester and north to Allentown. Pennsylvania Route 663 begins at PA 100 in Pottstown and follows King Street east and Charlotte Street northeast before leaving the borough and continuing to Pennsburg and Quakertown. Pennsylvania Route 724 runs along the south bank of the Schuylkill River in Chester County.

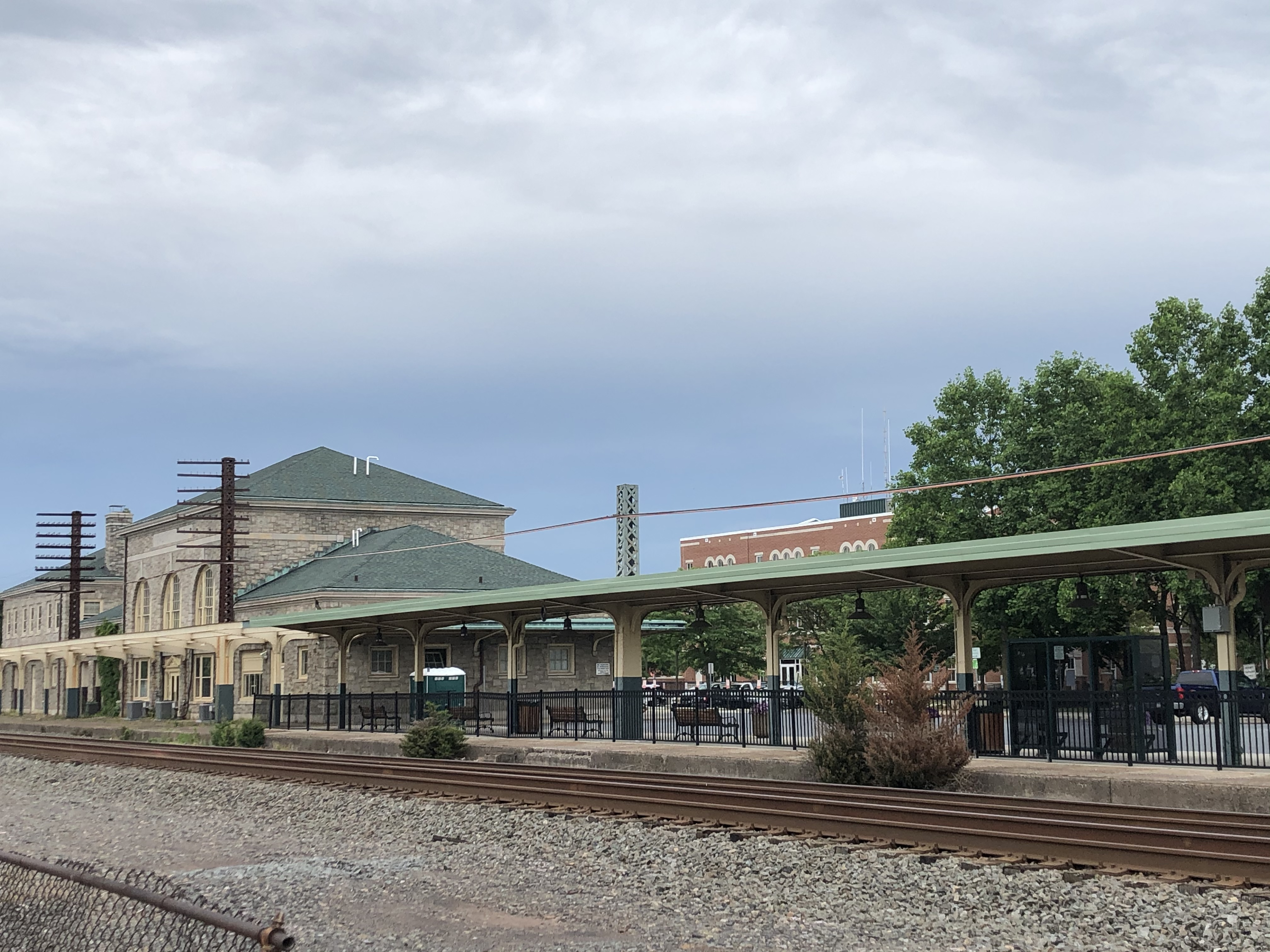
The Charles W. Dickinson Transportation Center, located at the former Pottstown station, is the main hub for all Pottstown Area Rapid Transit buses.

Local bus service in the Pottstown area is owned, funded, and administered by the Borough of Pottstown and operated by Pottstown Area Rapid Transit (PART). PART operates five routes Monday through Saturday out of the Charles W. Dickinson Transportation Center in downtown Pottstown along with a paratransit service for disabled people. SEPTA's Route 93 bus connects Pottstown with the Norristown Transportation Center in Norristown. Amtrak Thruway bus service operated by Krapf Coaches connected Pottstown with the BARTA Transportation Center in Reading and 30th Street Station in Philadelphia; the bus stopped on Hanover Street near the Charles W. Dickinson Transportation Center. Amtrak Thruway service to Pottstown was discontinued on March 18, 2025.

Pottstown is serviced by Pottstown Municipal Airport, a general aviation airport, and a short distance from Pottstown is Heritage Field Airport located in Limerick.

Passenger train service between Reading/Pottstown and Philadelphia was operated by Conrail under the auspices of SEPTA until July 29, 1981, when all non-electrified routes were terminated. Efforts to reinstitute commuter trains, such as the Schuylkill Valley Metro, have so far been unsuccessful. The station still exists and is currently home to a district justice office. Norfolk Southern Railway provides freight rail service to Pottstown along the Harrisburg Line. The Colebrookdale Railroad is a heritage railway running from Pottstown to Boyertown.

== Education ==
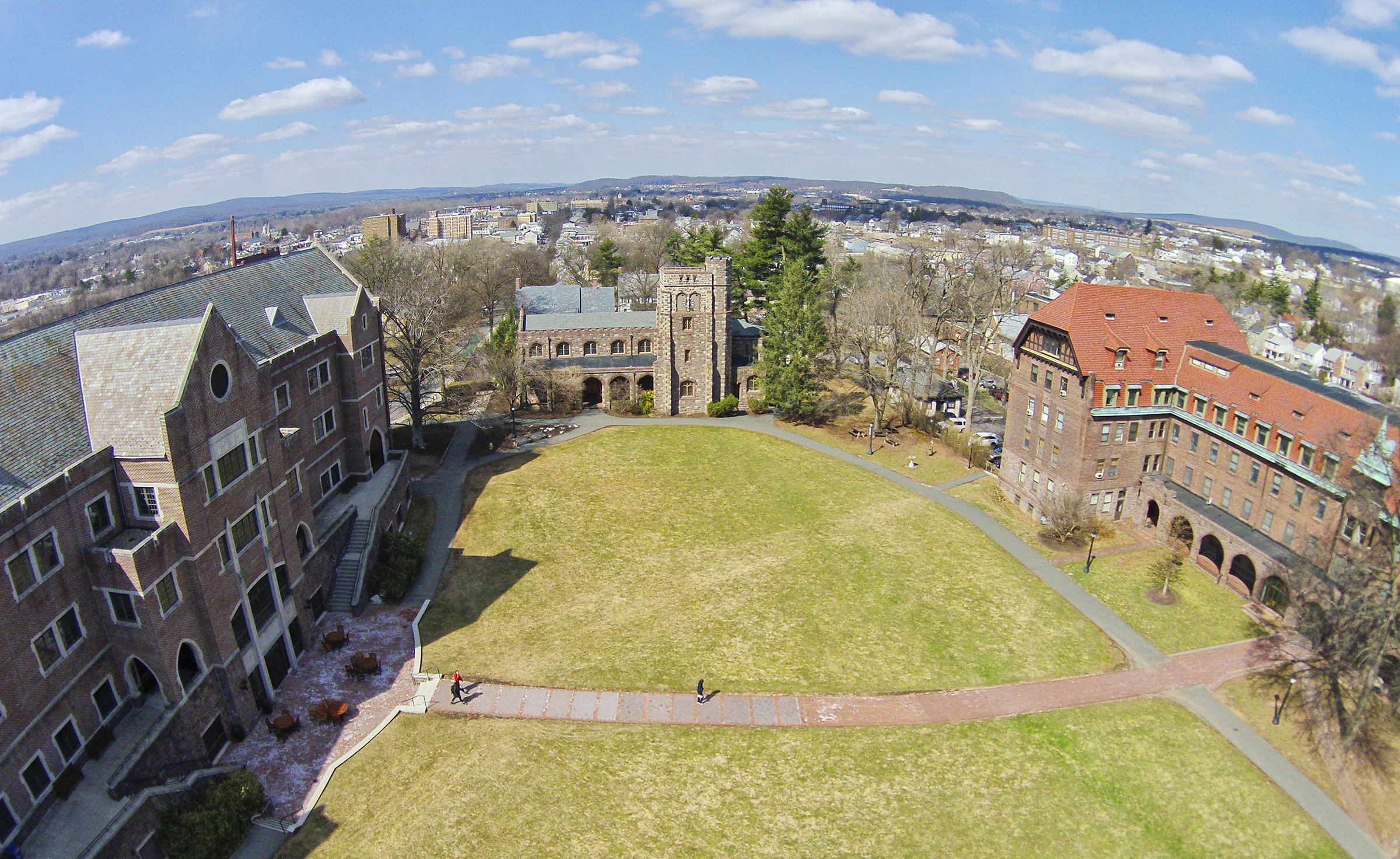
Aerial view of The Hill School

=== Public library ===
- Pottstown Regional Public Library

=== Colleges ===
- Montgomery County Community College – West Campus

=== Public school districts ===
- The Pottstown School District serves the borough.
- The Pottsgrove School District serves the surrounding townships in Montgomery County.
- The Owen J. Roberts School District serves the suburban/rural area to the south of the borough in Chester County, such as Warwick Township, East Nantmeal Township, South Coventry Township, North Coventry Township, East Vincent Township, East Coventry Township and West Vincent Township. It consists of five elementary schools, a middle school, and the Owen J. Roberts High School.

=== Private schools ===
- The Hill School
- Wyndcroft School
- Saint Aloysius School
- Alliance Christian School

== Media ==
=== Newspapers ===
==== The Mercury ====
The Mercury is the smallest-circulation newspaper in the U.S. to have won two Pulitzer Prizes. The first came in 1979 in the Spot News Photography category by staff photographer Tom Kelly. The second came in 1990 for Editorial Writing by Tom Hylton.

=== Television ===
==== PCTV ====
PCTV (Pottstown Community TV) is owned and operated by the Borough of Pottstown and provides local government-access television (GATV) programming over Comcast Cable TV in over 77,000 homes in western Montgomery County, northern Chester County and eastern Berks County. In existence since 1983, PCTV produces programming on three local cable channels: 22, 27 and 98.

PCTV also covers local high school sports such as football, basketball, swimming or baseball.

=== Radio ===
WPAZ operates at 1370AM and serves the Greater Philadelphia Area. Originally WPAZ, the station changed its call letters to WBZH on October 28, 2011, and back to WPAZ on January 25, 2013. On November 1, 2013, the station began a traditional Christian music format of religious hymns and songs.

== Notable people ==
- Jacob Albright, a founder of United Methodist Church
- Aaron Beasley, NFL cornerback for Jacksonville Jaguars, New York Jets, and Atlanta Falcons
- Howie Bedell, MLB outfielder for the Milwaukee Braves and the Philadelphia Phillies, coach and front-office executive for various organizations
- John R. Brooke, Union general of American Civil War and Spanish–American War
- Naomi Childers, silent-film actress
- Jack Deloplaine, former NFL running back
- Brett Eppehimer, professional basketball player
- Nick Eppehimer, professional basketball player
- Charles H. Ewing, railroad executive
- Loren Gray, singer-songwriter and social media personality
- Al Grey, jazz trombonist, known for plunger technique, featured with Count Basie as soloist
- Calvin Grove, professional boxer; former IBF featherweight champion
- Daryl Hall, member of Grammy Award-nominated band Hall & Oates, inducted in Rock and Roll Hall of Fame
- Jonas Hampton, distance runner
- Dick Harter, college and NBA basketball coach
- Geof Manthorne, cake artist, co-star of Food Network's reality TV series Ace of Cakes
- Bobby Marshman, racing driver
- Keith "Bang Bang" McCurdy, celebrity tattoo artist
- Jim Mickle, film director
- Hildegard Peplau, nursing theorist; created middle-range nursing theory of interpersonal relations
- John Potts, Ironmaster, founder of Pottstown.
- Matthias Richards, U.S. Congressman
- Dave Ricketts, MLB catcher and coach with St. Louis Cardinals and Pittsburgh Pirates
- Dick Ricketts, NBA power forward and MLB pitcher; selected by St. Louis Hawks with first pick of 1955 NBA draft
- Marshall Rutter, lawyer and choral music advocate
- Len Sassaman, Technologist, Rumored creator of the Bitcoin network
- George Seasholtz, former NFL fullback for Milwaukee Badgers
- Amanda Smith, founder of Mrs. Smith's Pies
- Billy Shantz, former MLB catcher and manager for the Philadelphia Athletics and the New York Yankees
- Bobby Shantz, former MLB pitcher; 8x Gold Glove Award winner, 1952 AL MVP
- Don Strock, former NFL quarterback for Miami Dolphins, former head coach of Florida International University
- Earl Strom, former NBA referee, member of Naismith Memorial Basketball Hall of Fame
- Frank D. Wagner, Vice admiral in the U.S. Navy
- Irving Price Wanger, Republican member of the U.S. House of Representatives from Pennsylvania
- Rian Wallace, former NFL linebacker for the Pittsburgh Steelers and the Washington Football Team
- Buck Weaver, former MLB shortstop for Chicago White Sox, banned after 1919 Black Sox Scandal
- Trey Yesavage, MLB pitcher for the Toronto Blue Jays
- Harry Joe Yorgey, professional boxer
