= Yates Mill =

- U.S. National Register of Historic Places
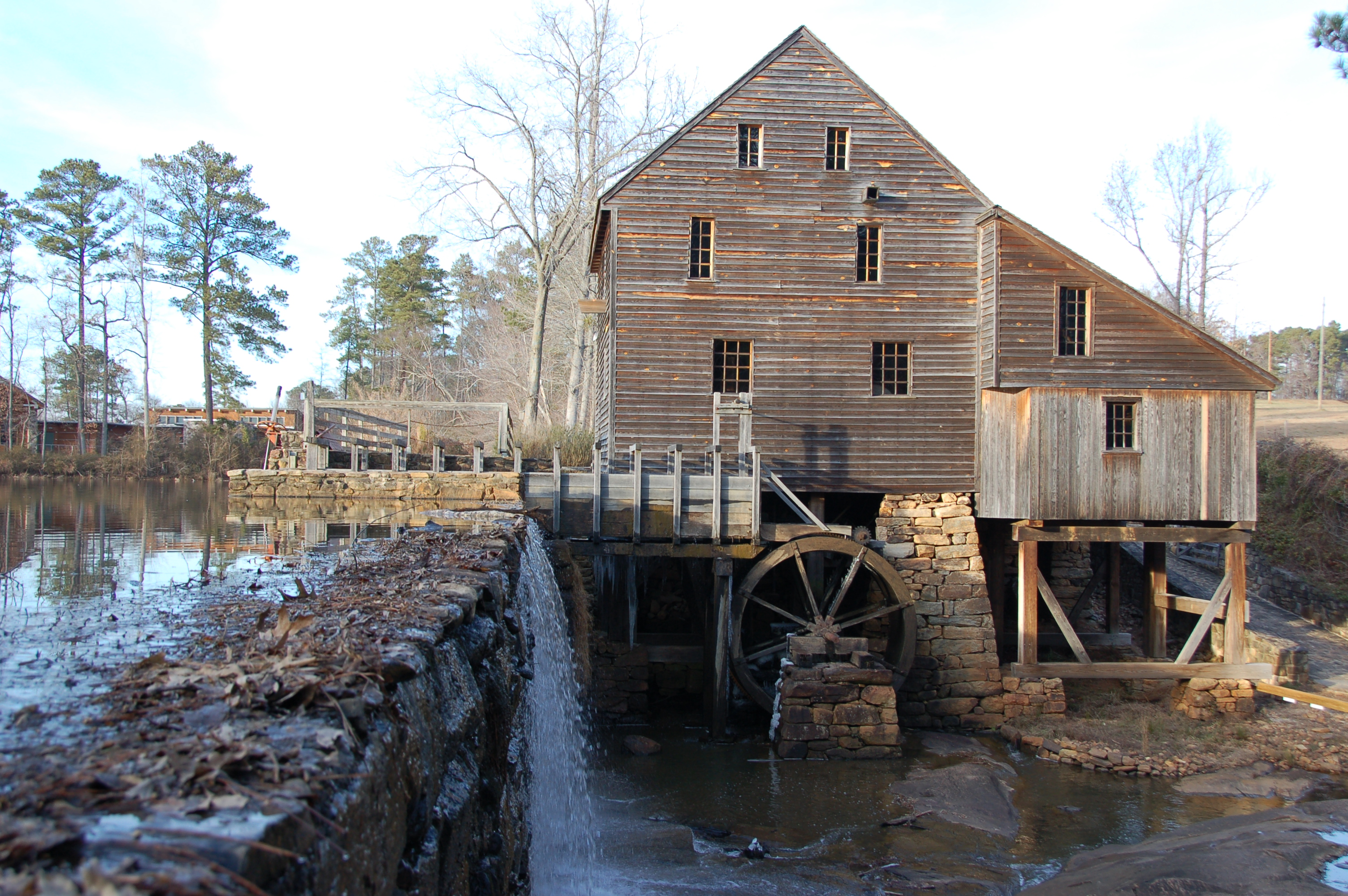

- Location within North Carolina Location within the United States
- Location: Raleigh, North Carolina
- Coordinates: 35°43′6.88″N 78°41′18.03″W
- NRHP reference No.: 70000479
- Added to NRHP: February 26, 1970

Yates Mill is a fully restored, circa 1756 gristmill located five miles (8 km) south of downtown Raleigh, North Carolina, United States. It is the centerpiece of Historic Yates Mill County Park, in central Wake County. The park features the restored mill; a visitor center with a museum focused on milling and on the natural history of the area, classrooms, an auditorium and space for research conducted by North Carolina State University faculty and students; a 20-acre (81,000 m^{2}) lake; and extensive hiking trails. The park is managed as a native wildlife refuge with a mission to study and interpret the park's cultural, natural and agricultural heritage.

== History ==
Yates Mill, one of the oldest buildings in Wake County, is the region's only surviving operable gristmill. For nearly 200 years the water-powered mill produced lumber, milled corn and wheat, and carded wool. The land on which the mill is situated was surveyed for Samuel Pearson in October 1756, and granted to him by the Earl of Granville, one of the North Carolina colony's Lord Proprietors. The original mill was built around at that time. Pearson steadily increased his land holdings, and owned more than 600 acres (2.4 km^{2}) at the time of his death in 1802. In 1819, accumulated debts forced Pearson's son, Simon, to sell the mill and its surrounding acreage at a sheriff's auction. William Boylan, a prominent Raleigh businessman and director of the State Bank, bought the property, and over the next 30 years modernized the mill several times, adding a sawmill in the 1840s.

In 1853, Thomas Briggs, John Primrose, and James Penny acquired the mill. A decade later, in the midst of the Civil War, the partners sold the mill and surrounding 94 acres (380,000 m^{2}) to Phares and Roxanna Yates, James Penny's son-in-law and daughter. Penny's involvement in the murder of a Mr. Franklin may have brought on the sale. According to legend, Franklin was a Northern sympathizer who Penny killed for not paying a $700 mill debt. In 1865, Franklin's widow supposedly told Federal troops occupying Raleigh that her husband's death was due to his support for the Union. The soldiers tried to burn the mill by setting fire to the entrance. Charred wooden beams today attest to the unsuccessful attempt.

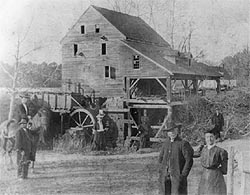
Yates Mill, circa 1890–1920

Yates and his descendants operated the mill until 1948, when businessman A. E. Finley acquired the property. Finley constructed a retreat lodge by the millpond for the use of his family and employees. Due to lack of demand, however, the old mill was closed in 1953. Ten years later, North Carolina State University acquired the property, consolidating it into a larger tract to be used as an experimental farm. The mill was mainly used for storage until 1989, when Yates Mill Associates was incorporated to marshal its restoration. The mill narrowly escaped destruction in 1996, when rains unleashed by Hurricane Fran burst its 250-year-old stone dam. In 1996, Yates Mill Associates and Wake County Parks, Recreation and Open Space unveiled a public-private partnership to rehabilitate the dam and mill as part of a 574-acre (2.32 km^{2}) historic and environmental park. Yates Mill is now a designated Raleigh Historic Landmark.

== Current use ==
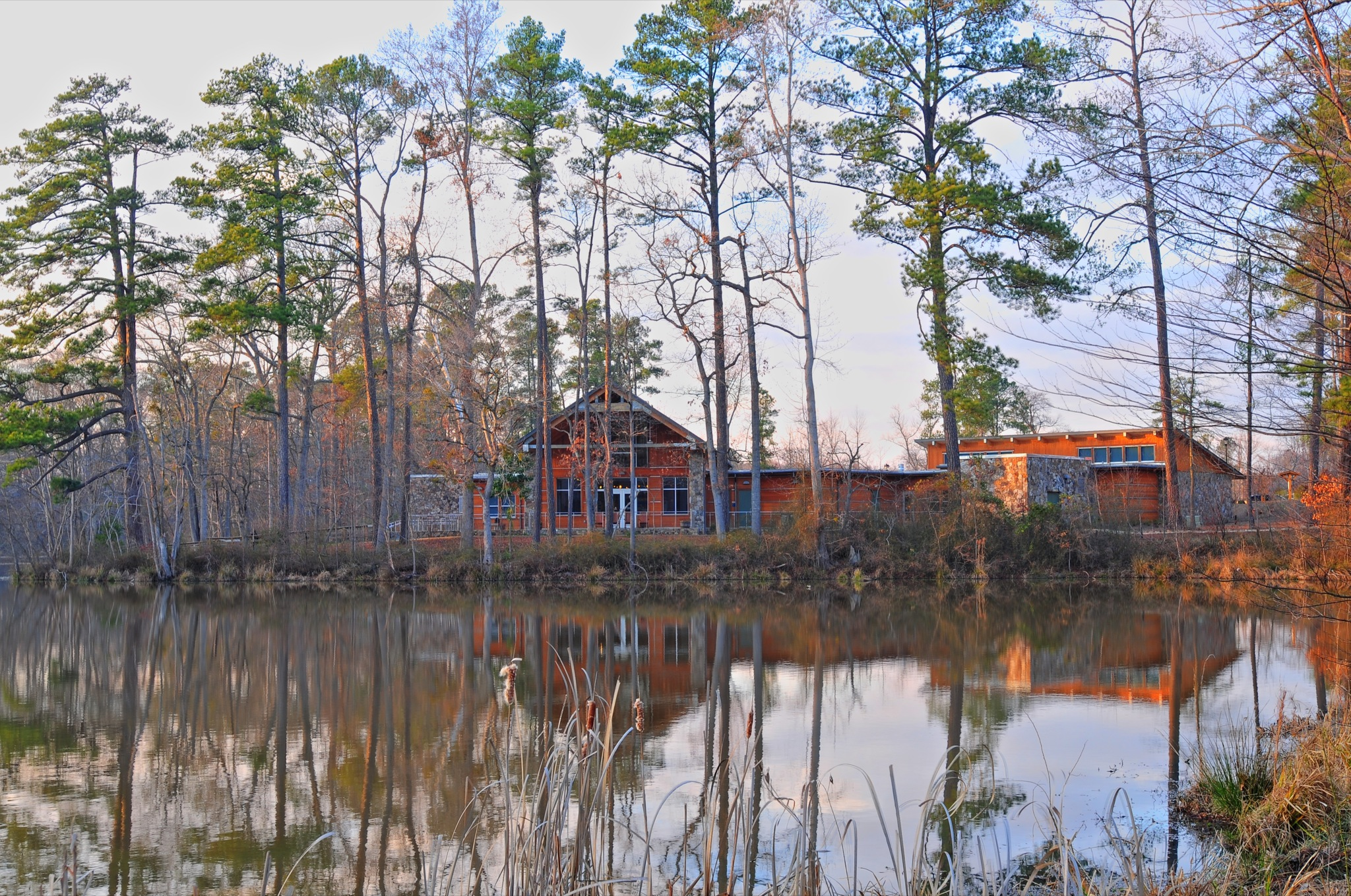
Yates Mill Pond and the A.E. Finley Center

The mill stood vacant for several years until Yates Mill Associates, Inc. began restoration efforts in 1988. The mill is an example of the Oliver Evans type of grist mill and has been restored to its state as of the mid-19th century. Both the corn and wheat grinding machinery have been restored. Several corn grindings have been held since the mill officially opened to the public on May 20, 2006. The mill is frequently open for historic tours and corn grinding is demonstrated on specific days.

Yates Mill Associates, Inc. restored the mill with donations from governmental agencies, North Carolina State University, foundations, corporations and private citizens. North Carolina State University provided 154 acres (0.62 km^{2}) on a long-term lease and will use the park for ongoing natural history research.

Wake County purchased 16 acres (65,000 m^{2}) to add to the park and The North Carolina Department of Agriculture and Consumer Services have provided access to an adjacent parcel of about 400 acres (1.6 km^{2}) for park use. The Wake County Parks, Recreation and Open Space Department oversaw the development of this 574-acre (2.32 km^{2}) park. The County supervised the construction of the A.E. Finley Center for Education and Research, and provides the personnel and support needed to operate the park. Yates Mill Associates organizes and finances the maintenance of the mill and its demonstration using private donations and volunteer help.

== See also ==
- List of Registered Historic Places in North Carolina
