= Keefe-Mumbower Mill =

- U.S. National Register of Historic Places
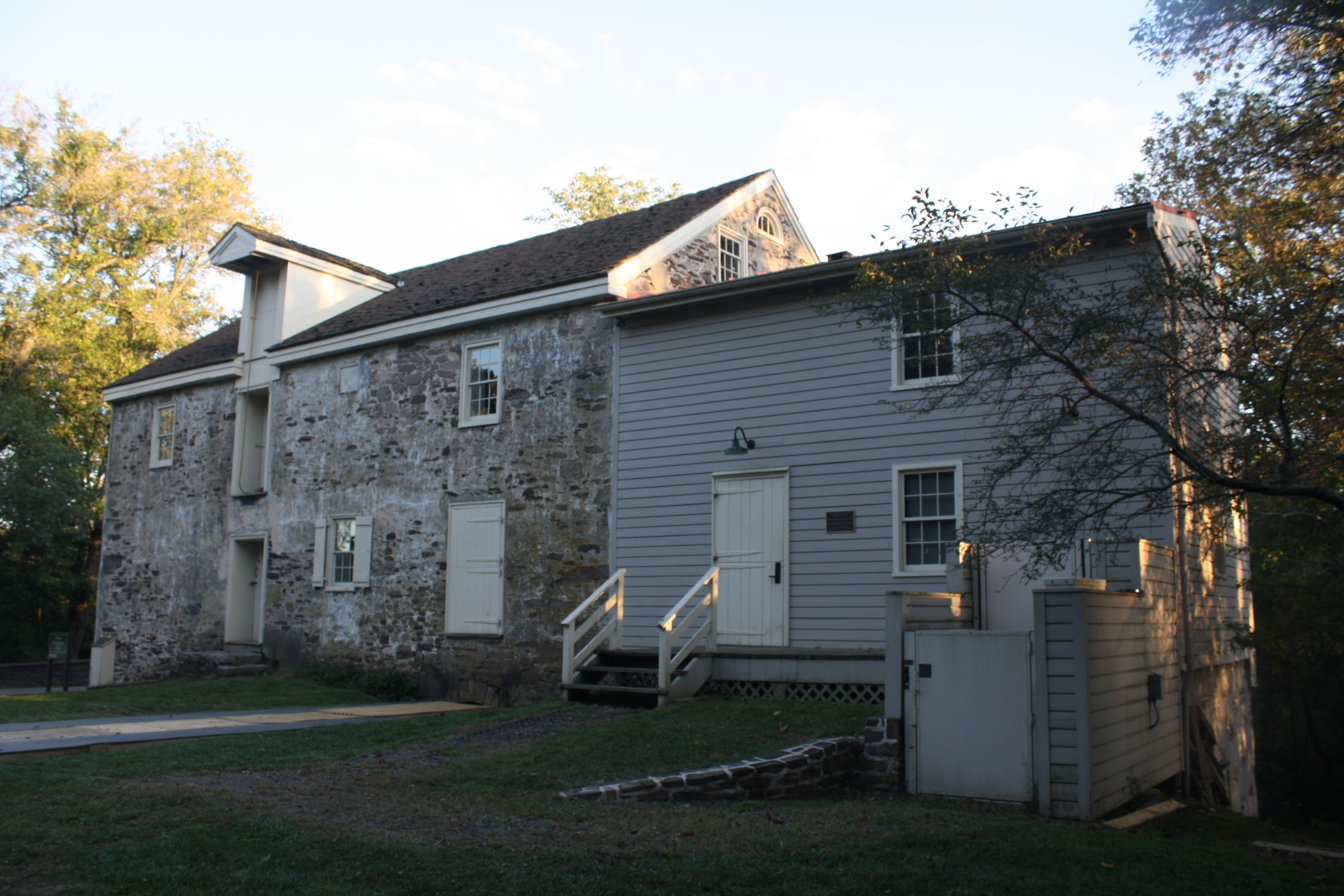

- Location within Pennsylvania Location within the United States
- Location: Northeastern corner of the junction of Swedesford and Township Line Roads, Upper Gwynedd Township, Pennsylvania
- Coordinates: 40°11′15″N 75°16′45″W
- Area: 1.2 acres (0.49 ha)
- Built: 1835
- Built by: Keefe, John
- NRHP reference No.: 08000784
- Added to NRHP: August 13, 2008

The Evans-Mumbower Mill is an historic grist mill that is located on Wissahickon Creek in Upper Gwynedd Township, Montgomery County, Pennsylvania, United States.

The mill was added to the National Register of Historic Places in 2008.

== History and architectural features ==
Built in 1835, this historic structure is a 3 1/2-story, banked-stucco-over-stone building with a two-story, wood-frame, reproduction addition. It was in use as a mill until 1930, and housed an Oliver Evans milling system.

The Evans-Mumbower Mill is now owned by the Wissahickon Valley Watershed Association, and is open for public tours and demonstrations once a month.
