= Upper Gwynedd Township, Pennsylvania =

Township in Pennsylvania, US

Upper Gwynedd Township
- Township
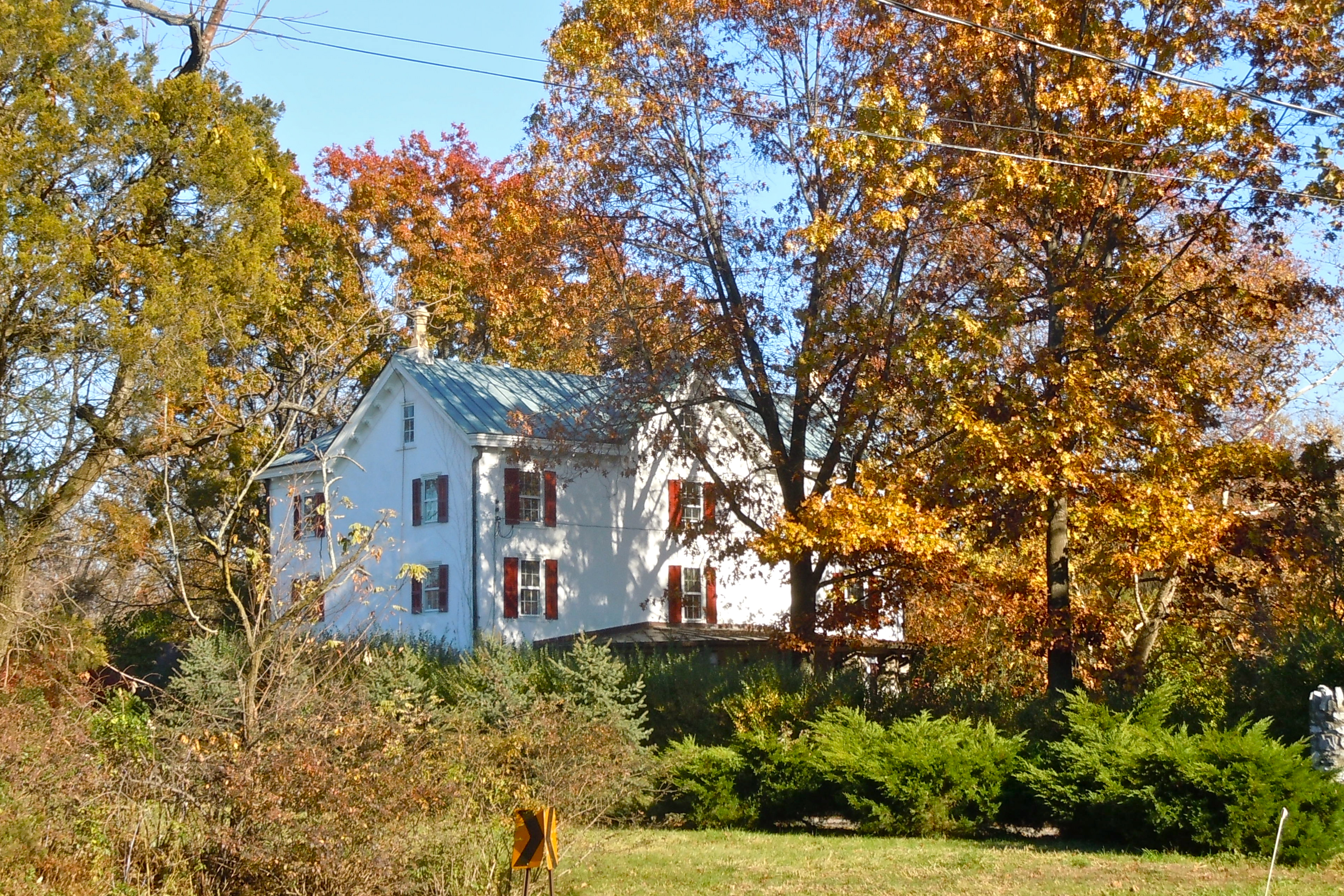
- Knipe-Moore-Rupp Farmhouse, built 1808

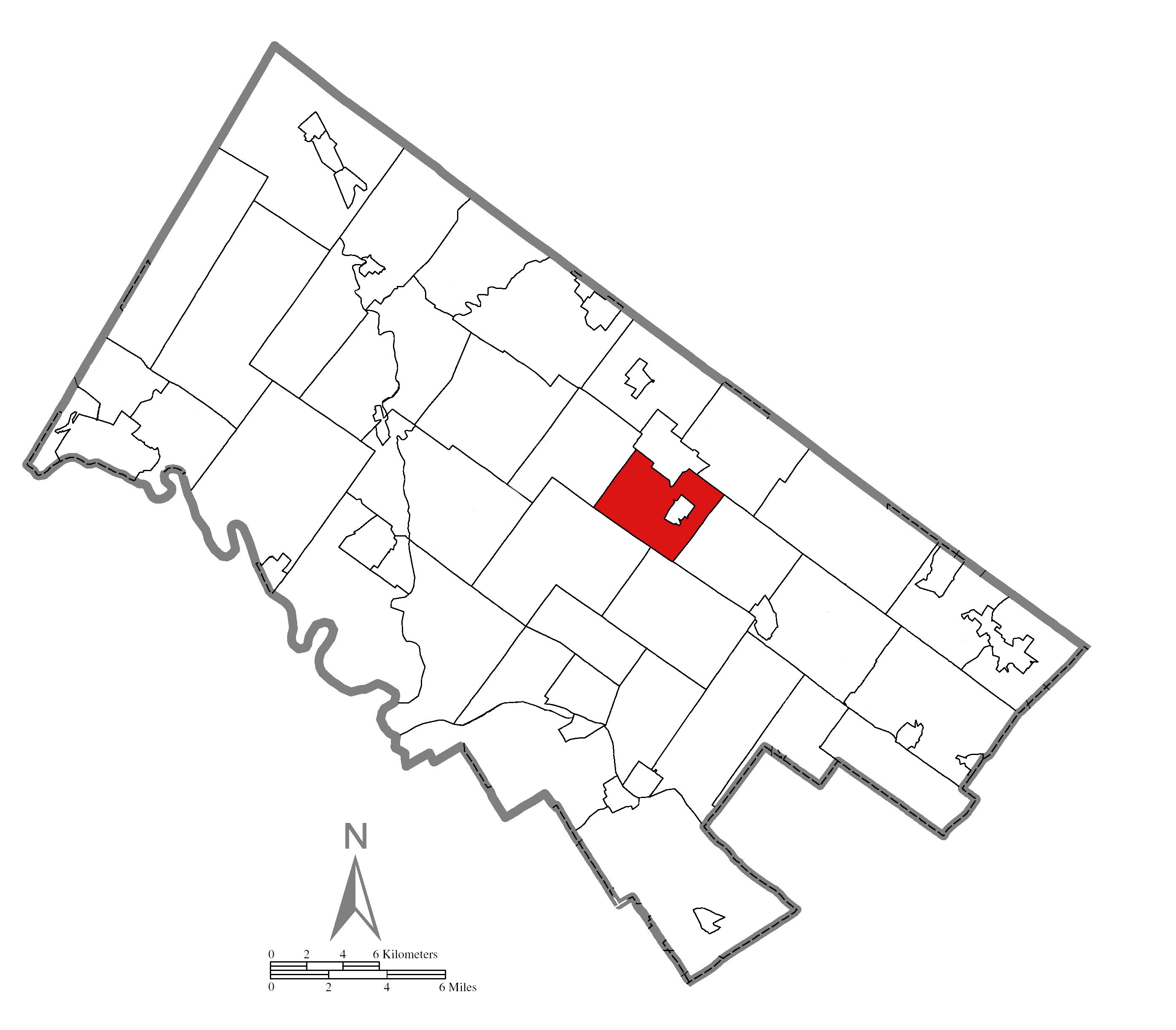
- Location of Pennsylvania in the United States

- Location within Pennsylvania Location within the United States
- Coordinates: 40°13′05″N 75°17′28″W
- Country: United States
- State: Pennsylvania
- County: Montgomery
- Founded: 1891
- Named for: Gwynedd, Wales

Area
  - Total: 8.13 sq mi (21.1 km^{2})
  - Land: 8.12 sq mi (21.0 km^{2})
  - Water: 0.00 sq mi (0 km^{2})
- Elevation: 335 ft (102 m)

Population (2020)
  - Total: 17,072
  - Estimate (2025): 17,255 ▲
  - Density: 2,100/sq mi (812/km^{2})
- Time zone: UTC-5 (EST)
  - Summer (DST): UTC-4 (EDT)
- Area codes: 215, 267 and 445
- FIPS code: 42-091-79056
- Website: www.uppergwynedd.org

Upper Gwynedd Township ( /ˈɡwɪnɛd/) is a township in Montgomery County, Pennsylvania, United States. At the time of the 2010 census, the population was 15,552. North Wales Borough is surrounded by Upper Gwynedd Township on all sides. Many homes and businesses with North Wales addresses are actually in Upper Gwynedd. Many properties with Lansdale addresses are in Upper Gwynedd as well. It is part of the North Penn Valley region that is centered around the borough of Lansdale.

Station Square, one of the first new transit oriented developments in the Philadelphia metropolitan area, is located in Upper Gwynedd on the border with Lansdale. It is across the street from Pennbrook Station with SEPTA rail service to Philadelphia.

== Geography ==
According to the U.S. Census Bureau, the township has a total area of 8.1 square miles (21 km^{2}), all land. It is in the Schuylkill watershed and is drained by the Towamencin and Wissahickon Creeks. Its villages include Gwynedd Heights, Gwynedd Square, and West Point.

=== Neighboring municipalities ===
- Lansdale (north)
- Montgomery Township (east)
- Lower Gwynedd Township (southeast)
- Whitpain Township (south)
- Worcester Township (west)
- Towamencin Township (northwest)

Upper Gwynedd Township surrounds the borough of North Wales.

== Demographics ==
Historical population
Census	Pop.	Note	%±
1930	1,478		—
1940	1,183		−20.0%
1950	2,164		82.9%
1960	4,661		115.4%
1970	6,856		47.1%
1980	9,487		38.4%
1990	12,197		28.6%
2000	14,243		16.8%
2010	15,552		9.2%
2020	17,072		9.8%
2025 (est.)	17,255		1.1%

As of the 2010 census, the township was 81.1% White, 4.2% Black or African American, 12.3% Asian, and 1.5% were two or more races. 2.2% of the population were of Hispanic or Latino ancestry.

As of the census of 2000, there were 14,243 people, 5,341 households, and 4,005 families residing in the township. The population density was 1,750.4 people per square mile (675.8 people/km^{2}). There were 5,496 housing units at an average density of 675.4 per square mile (260.8/km^{2}). The racial makeup of the township was 86.77% White, 3.97% African American, 0.08% Native American, 7.84% Asian, 0.41% from other races, and 0.94% from two or more races. Hispanic or Latino of any race were 1.45% of the population.

There were 5,341 households, out of which 33.7% had children under the age of 18 living with them, 65.3% were married couples living together, 7.6% had a female householder with no husband present, and 25.0% were non-families. 21.2% of all households were made up of individuals, and 7.2% had someone living alone who was 65 years of age or older. The average household size was 2.63 and the average family size was 3.08.

In the township, the population was spread out, with 23.8% under the age of 18, 6.2% from 18 to 24, 29.2% from 25 to 44, 28.0% from 45 to 64, and 12.8% who were 65 years of age or older. The median age was 40 years. For every 100 females there were 92.0 males. For every 100 females age 18 and over, there were 88.3 males.

The median income for a household in the township was $71,078, and the median income for a family was $81,371. Males had a median income of $52,430 versus $37,729 for females. The per capita income for the township was $32,806. About 1.4% of families and 1.9% of the population were below the poverty line, including 1.7% of those under age 18 and 2.7% of those age 65 or over.

== Transportation ==
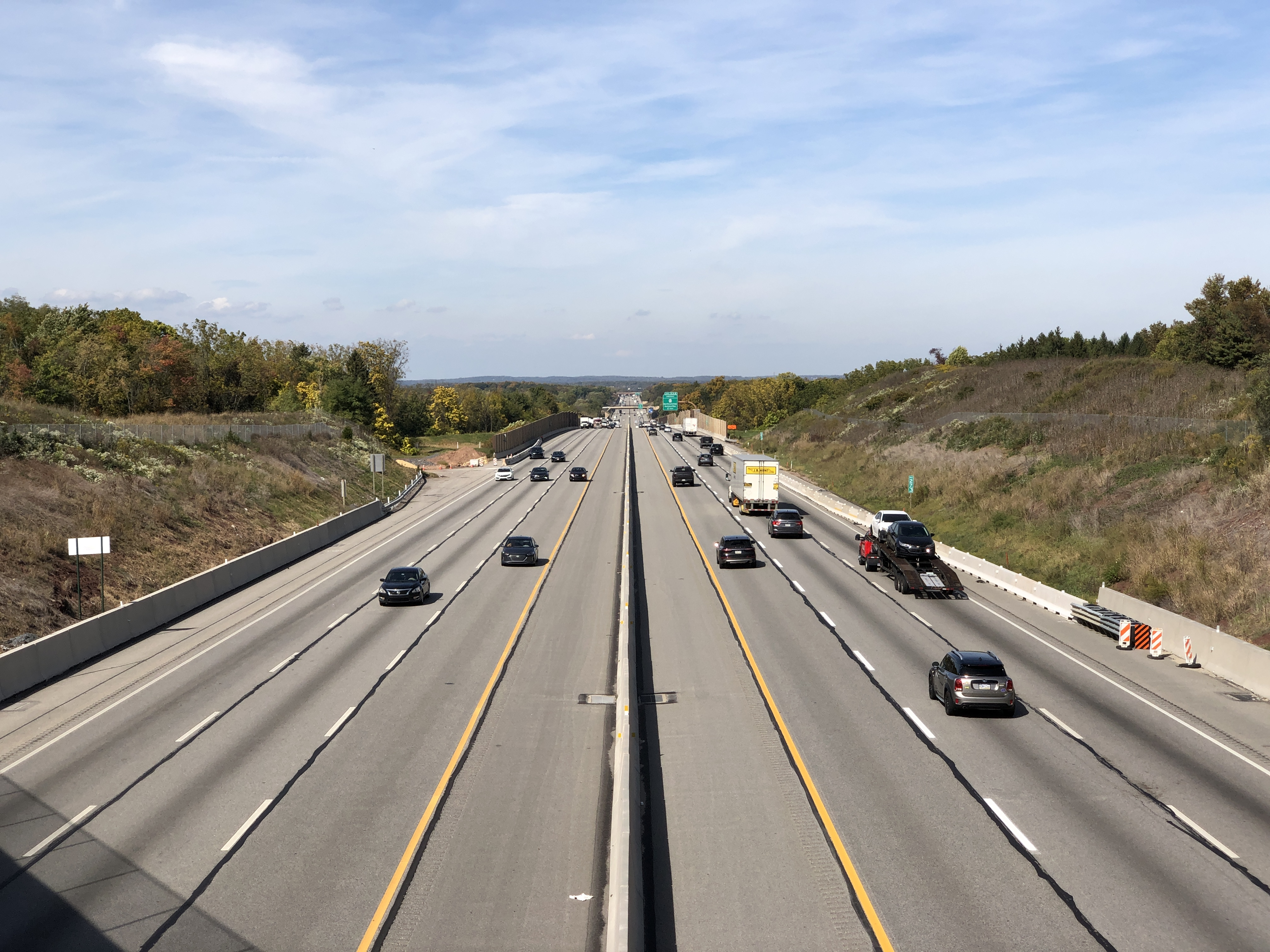
I-476/Pennsylvania Turnpike Northeast Extension northbound in Upper Gwynedd Township

As of 2018, there were 64.08 miles (103.13 km) of public roads in Upper Gwynedd Township, of which 0.50 miles (0.80 km) were maintained by the Pennsylvania Turnpike Commission (PTC), 9.11 miles (14.66 km) were maintained by the Pennsylvania Department of Transportation (PennDOT) and 54.47 miles (87.66 km) were maintained by the township.

The Pennsylvania Turnpike Northeast Extension (I-476) is the most prominent highway passing through Upper Gwynedd Township. However, the nearest interchange is in Towamencin Township. U.S. Route 202 is the most prominent highway providing local access, traversing the eastern edge of the township along the Dekalb Pike and a new parkway. U.S. Route 202 Business follows the old alignment of US 202 along the Dekalb Pike north of the new parkway's southern terminus. Pennsylvania Route 63 forms the township's northeastern border, while Pennsylvania Route 363 acts as the township's northwestern border.

SEPTA Regional Rail's Lansdale/Doylestown Line runs through Upper Gwynedd Township; however, there are no stations in the township. The nearest train station is North Wales station in North Wales, which is surrounded by the township. SEPTA provides Suburban Bus service to Upper Gwynedd Township along Route 94, which runs between the Chestnut Hill section of Philadelphia and the Montgomery Mall, and Route 96, which runs between the Norristown Transportation Center in Norristown and Lansdale.

== Government and politics ==
Presidential elections results
Year	Republican	Democratic
2020	38.3% 4,116	60.0% 6,445
2016	40.0% 3,649	55.2% 5,044
2012	47.4% 4,165	51.4% 4,522
2008	45.4% 3,991	53.6% 4,709
2004	50.5% 4,116	48.9% 3,982
2000	52.3% 3,568	45.1% 3,076
1996	46.6% 2,811	42.6% 2,569
1992	43.7% 1,921	36.4% 1,599

=== Commissioners ===
Upper Gwynedd Township elects five at-large commissioners to four-year terms.

- Katherine Carter, President, Finance/Personnel/Administration/WWTP
- Rebecca Moodie, Vice President, Planning & Zoning
- Denise Hull, Public Safety
- Liz McNaney
- Greg Moll, Parks & Rec / Public Works

=== Legislators ===
- State Senator Tracy Pennycuick, 24th district, Republican
- State Representative Liz Hanbidge, 61st district, Democrat
- US Representative Madeleine Dean, 4th district, Democrat

== History ==
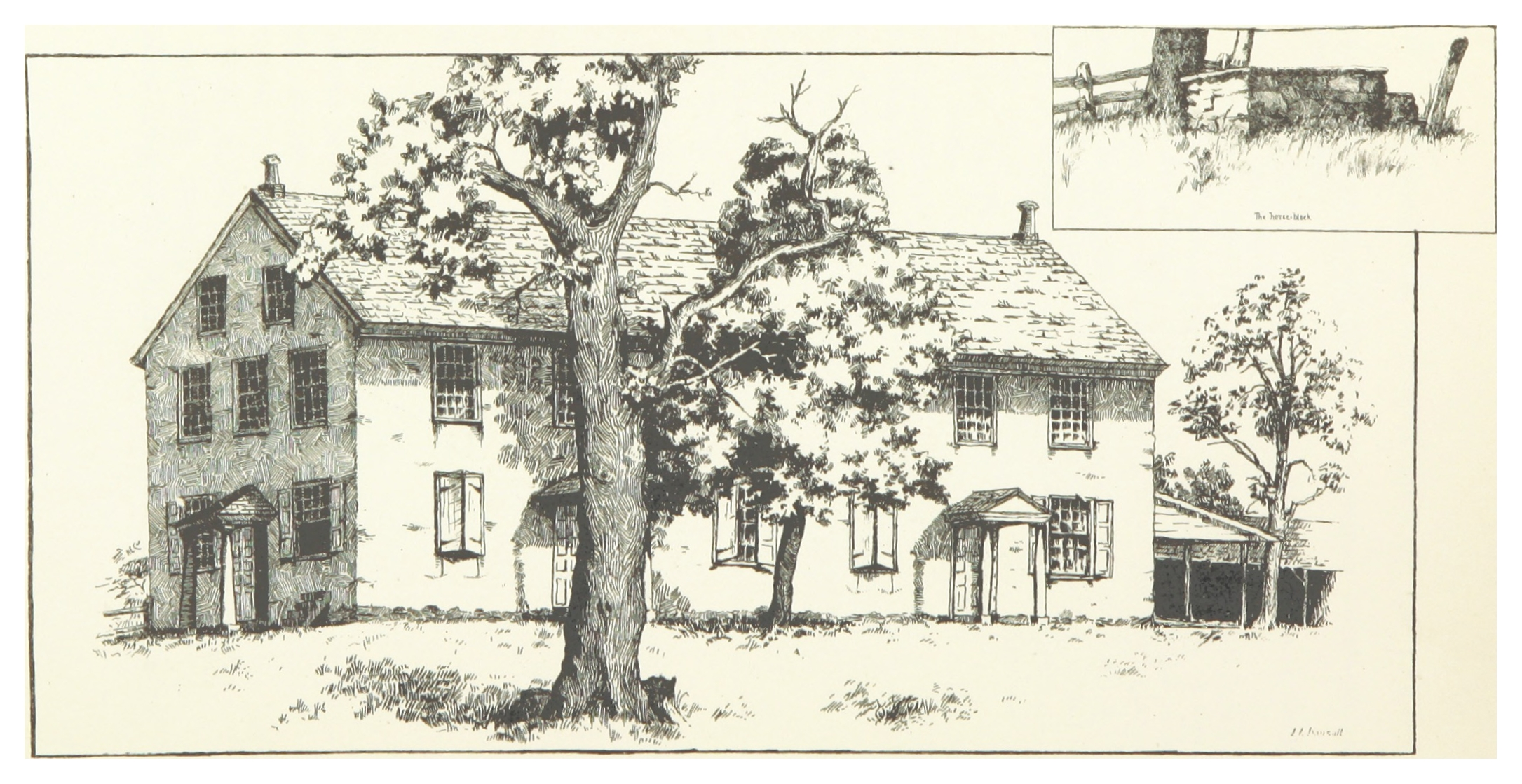
The Friends' meeting house at Gwynedd, built 1823.

Gwynedd was founded in 1698 by Welsh Quakers. The township was then split into Lower Gwynedd and Upper Gwynedd in 1891. The name Gwynedd means "Fair Land" in Welsh.

The township is so named because it was originally settled largely by migrants from Gwynedd and other parts of North Wales in the 17th and 18th centuries. For several generations, the main language used in the township was Welsh.

The Keefe-Mumbower Mill, Knipe-Johnson Farm, Knipe-Moore-Rupp Farm, and Isaac Kulp Farm are listed on the National Register of Historic Places.
