= West Point, Pennsylvania =

Unincorporated community in Pennsylvania, US

- Unincorporated community
- Location within Pennsylvania Location within the United States
- Coordinates: 40°12′24″N 75°17′58″W
- Country: United States
- State: Pennsylvania
- County: Montgomery
- Township: Upper Gwynedd
- Elevation: 328 ft (100 m)
- Time zone: UTC-5 (Eastern (EST))
  - Summer (DST): UTC-4 (EDT)
- ZIP Code: 19486
- Area codes: 215, 267 and 445
- GNIS feature ID: 1191096

West Point is an unincorporated community in Upper Gwynedd Township, Montgomery County, Pennsylvania, United States. Zacharias Creek starts here and flows west into the Skippack Creek, a tributary of the Perkiomen Creek. Merck & Co. has a facility in West Point, which is split between the Lansdale and North Wales post offices with the ZIP codes of 19446 and 19454, respectively. It is part of the North Penn Valley region that is centered on the borough of Lansdale.
