= Knipe–Johnson Farm =

- U.S. National Register of Historic Places
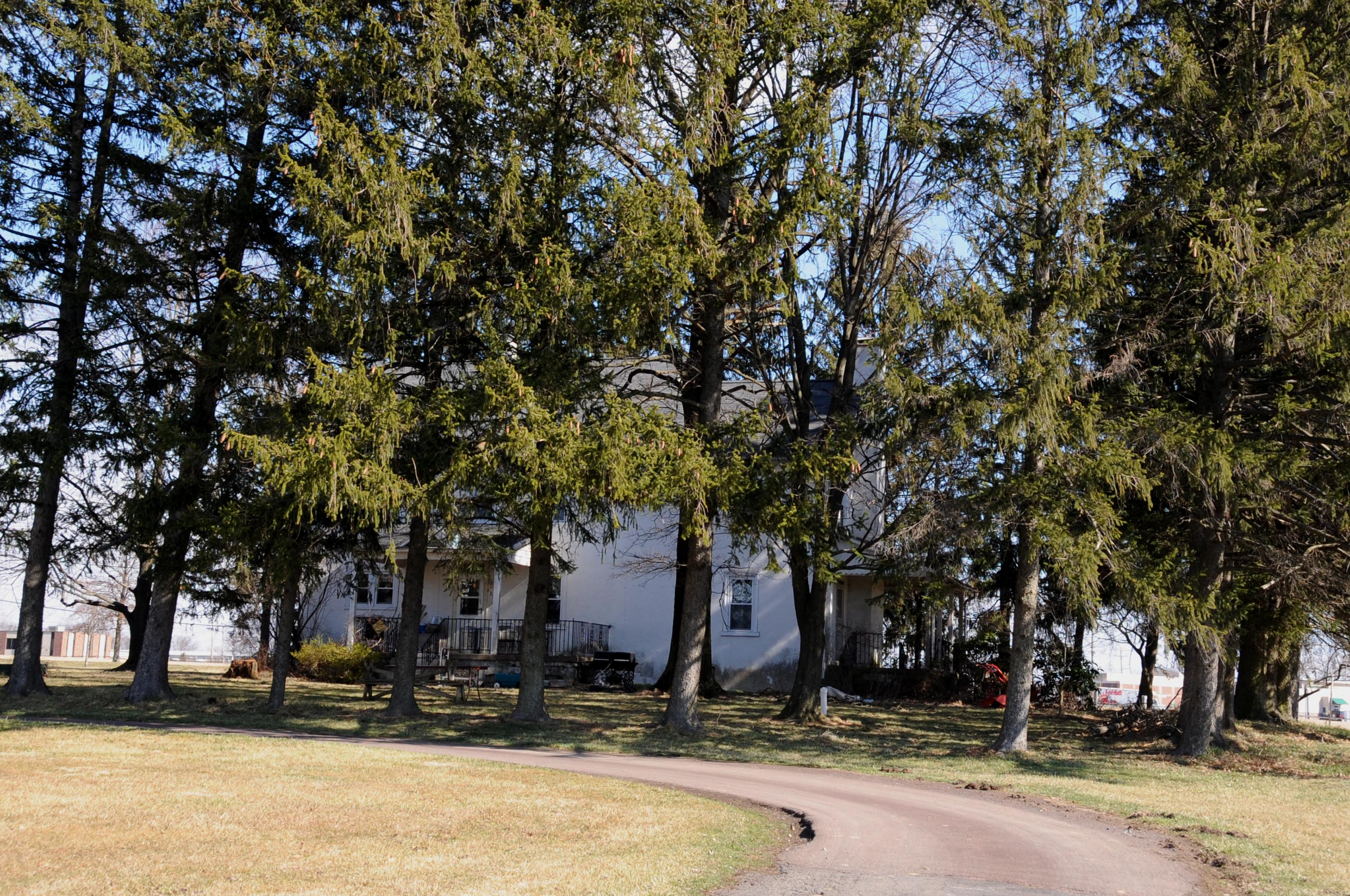

- Location within Pennsylvania Location within the United States
- Location: 606 DeKalb Pike, Upper Gwynedd Township, Pennsylvania
- Coordinates: 40°13′02″N 75°15′04″W
- Area: 108 acres (44 ha)
- Built: 1840
- Architectural style: Georgian
- NRHP reference No.: 00001346
- Added to NRHP: November 8, 2000

Knipe–Johnson Farm is a historic home and farm located in Upper Gwynedd Township, Montgomery County, Pennsylvania. The property includes six contributing buildings that include: the farmhouse (c. 1840), the Pennsylvania bank barn (c. 1840), the stone springhouse (c. 1790), and three agricultural outbuildings dated to the 1940s. The farmhouse is a two-story, two bay by two bay, stone dwelling with stone and concrete block additions. It has a vernacular Georgian style.

It was added to the National Register of Historic Places in 2000.
