= Oliver Evans =

American inventor

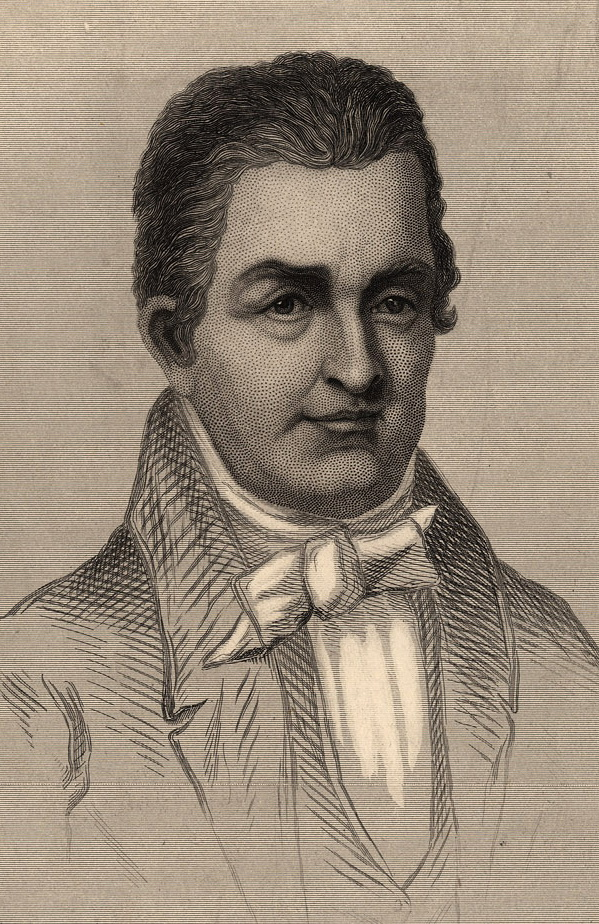
- "Oliver Evans, the Watt of America"; Original portrait caption
- Born: September 13, 1755; Newport, Delaware Colony
- Died: April 15, 1819 (aged 63); New York City, New York, USA
- Occupations: Inventor, engineer
- Spouses: Sarah Tomlinson (m. 1783–1816) Hetty Ward (m. 1818–1819)
- Children: 7

Oliver Evans (September 13, 1755 – April 15, 1819) was an American inventor, engineer, and businessman born in rural Delaware and later rooted commercially in Philadelphia. He was one of the first Americans to build steam engines and was an advocate of high-pressure steam (as opposed to low-pressure steam). A pioneer in the fields of automation, materials handling and steam power, Evans was one of the most prolific and influential inventors in the early years of the United States. He left behind a long series of accomplishments, most notably designing and building the first fully automated industrial process, the first high-pressure steam engine, first vapor compression refrigeration and the first (albeit crude) amphibious vehicle and American automobile.

Born in Newport, Delaware, Evans received little formal education and in his mid-teens was apprenticed to a wheelwright. Going into business with his brothers, he worked for over a decade designing, building and perfecting an automated mill with devices such as bucket chains and conveyor belts. In doing so Evans designed a continuous process of manufacturing that required no human labor. This novel concept would prove critical to the Industrial Revolution and the development of mass production. Later in life Evans turned his attention to steam power and built the first high-pressure steam engine in the United States in 1801, developing his design independently of Richard Trevithick, who built the first in the world a year earlier. Evans was a driving force in the development and adoption of high-pressure steam engines in the United States. Evans dreamed of building a steam-powered wagon and eventually constructing and running one in 1805. Known as the Oruktor Amphibolos, it was the first automobile in the country and the world's first amphibious vehicle, although it was too primitive to be a success as either.

Evans was a visionary who produced designs and ideas far ahead of their time. He was the first to describe vapor-compression refrigeration and propose a design for the first refrigerator in 1805, but it would be three decades until his colleague Jacob Perkins would be able to construct a working example. Similarly, he drew up designs for a solar boiler, machine gun, steam-carriage gearshift, dough-kneading machine, perpetual baking oven, marine salvage process, quadruple-effect evaporator, and a scheme for urban gas lighting, ideas and designs which would not be made reality until some time after his death. Evans had influential backers and political allies, but lacked social graces and was disliked by many of his peers. Disappointed and then angry at the perceived lack of recognition for his contributions, Evans became combative and bitter in later years, which damaged his reputation and left him isolated. Despite the importance of his work, his contributions were frequently overlooked (or attributed to others after his death) so he never became a household name alongside the other steam pioneers of his era.

== Early life, 1755–83 ==
Oliver Evans was born in Newport, Delaware on September 13, 1755, to Charles and Ann Stalcop Evans. His father was a cordwainer by trade, though he purchased a large farm to the north of Newport on the Red Clay Creek and moved his family there when Oliver was still in his infancy. Oliver was the fifth of twelve children; he had four sisters and seven brothers. Little else is known of Evans's early life, and surviving records provide few details as to his formative years. The nature and location of his early education have not been preserved, however, his literacy was demonstrably strong from a young age, both as a writer and an avid reader on technical subjects. Aged 17, Evans was apprenticed to a wheelwright and wagon-maker in Newport. An anecdote from the period recalls that his master, an illiterate and extremely frugal man, forbade Evans the use of candles to illuminate his reading in the evenings. Evans found another way by collecting scraps and shavings of wood from his work during the day to serve as fuel for small fires. The Revolutionary War began when Evans was 19. He enlisted in a Delaware militia company but saw no active service during the war.

By the age of 22, Evans moved out of wheel-making and became a specialist in forming the fine wire used in textile cards, which was used to comb fibers in preparation for the spinning process to make thread or yarn. A desire to increase the efficiency of this process led him to his first invention—a machine that would bend wire into teeth and cut them off rapidly to aid the assembly of cards. George Latimer, then a justice of the peace in Newport, saw its potential and tasked a blacksmith with creating the machine, which became one of Evans's early successes when it was introduced in 1778. Evans wished to go further in mechanizing the production of textile cards by developing a machine that could puncture the leather into which the wire teeth were inserted. His invention greatly speeded the card manufacturing process, producing around 1,500 teeth every minute, though Evans himself was unable to find financial backing to commercialize his invention. Nevertheless, over the next two decades card manufacturing innovations inspired by Evans led to the development of automated textile card production, then in great demand due to the growth of the Southern cotton industry. Early pioneers of mechanized textile-card production, including Giles Richards and Amos Whittemore, are thought to have borrowed heavily from his original designs.

Evans also began experimenting in this period with steam power and its potential for commercial application. His early ideas culminated in a Delaware state patent application in 1783 for a steam-powered wagon, but it was denied as Evans had yet to produce a working model. That same year, aged 27, Evans married Sarah Tomlinson, daughter of a local farmer, in Old Swedes' Episcopal Church in Wilmington.

== Developing the automatic flour mill, 1783–90 ==
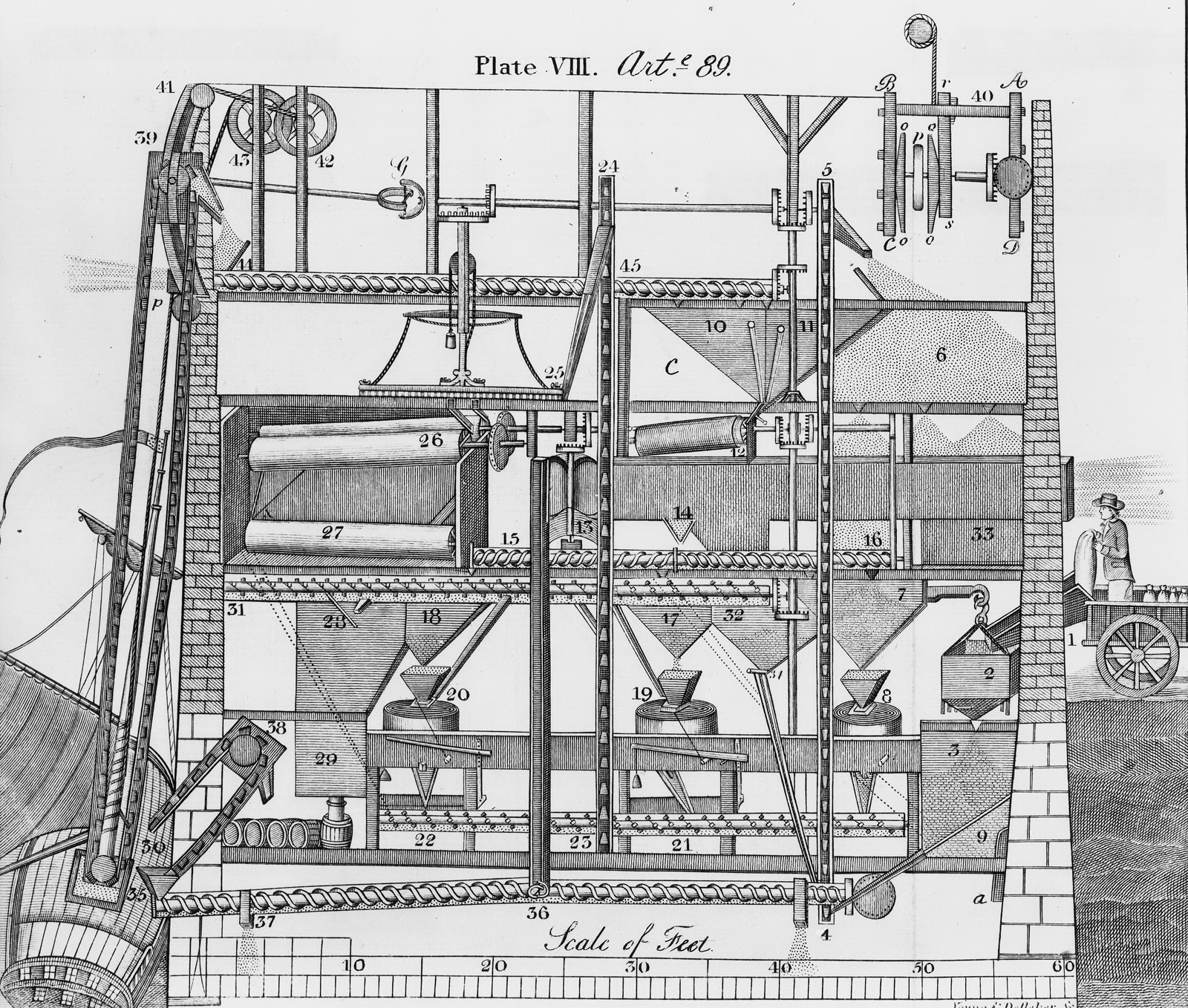
Evans's design for the automated flour mill, 1790

Evans's attention turned to flour milling in the early 1780s, an industry that was booming in rapidly industrializing northern Delaware. In this era, the operation of grist mills was labor-intensive. Although the stages of the milling process—grinding, cooling, sifting, and packing—were beginning to be mechanized to various degrees, gravity or manual labor was required to move grain from one stage to the next. Additionally, some stages (particularly cooling) were slow and inefficient, creating significant production process bottlenecks. Mills were becoming commonplace in populated areas and those with ready access to waterways for power, but the bulk of milling in the 1780s was done in the home through hand milling. Furthermore, the quality of milled wheat was poor in colonial America. Hard wheat varieties were insufficiently ground and sifted by mills, leaving a flour that was coarse and brown. Cross-contamination was a major problem: mill processes were not well-partitioned; the many people moving about the mill contaminated the flour with dirt, grain and other impurities. The result, Evans recognized, was a low-quality product that took too many laborers to make.

In 1783, two of Evans's brothers began building a mill in Newport on part of the family's farm estate which they purchased from their father, and Evans was recruited to oversee its construction on the Red Clay Creek. When the mill opened in 1785 it was of a conventional design, but over the next five years, Evans began to experiment with inventions to reduce the reliance upon labor for milling. Moving wheat from the bottom to the top of the mill to begin the process was the most onerous task of all in contemporary mills. Evans's first innovation was a bucket elevator to facilitate this process. Chains of buckets to raise water was a Roman technology that had been used in various guises since antiquity. Evans had seen diagrams of their use for marine applications and realized with some modification and careful engineering they could be used to raise grain, so a series of bucket elevators around a mill could move grain and flour from one process to the next. Another labor-intensive task was that of spreading meal. This came out of the grinding process warm and moist, needing cooling and drying before it could be sifted and packed. Traditionally the task was done by manually shoveling meal across large floors. In response, Evans developed the "hopper boy", a device that gathered meal from a bucket elevator and spread it evenly over the drying floor—a mechanical rake would revolve around the floorspace. This would even out newly deposited meals for cooling and drying, while a gentle incline in the design of the rake blades would slowly move the flour towards central chutes, from which the material would be sifted. Used in conjunction, the two innovations saved many hours of labor and greatly reduced the risk of contamination. (Note: Evans would later write at length on his design vision:"[The machines] perform every necessary movement of the grain, and meal, from one part of the mill to another, and from one machine to another, through all the various operations, from the time the grain is emptied from the wagoner's bag ... until completely manufactured into flour ... without the aid of manual labor, excepting to set the different machines in motion.")

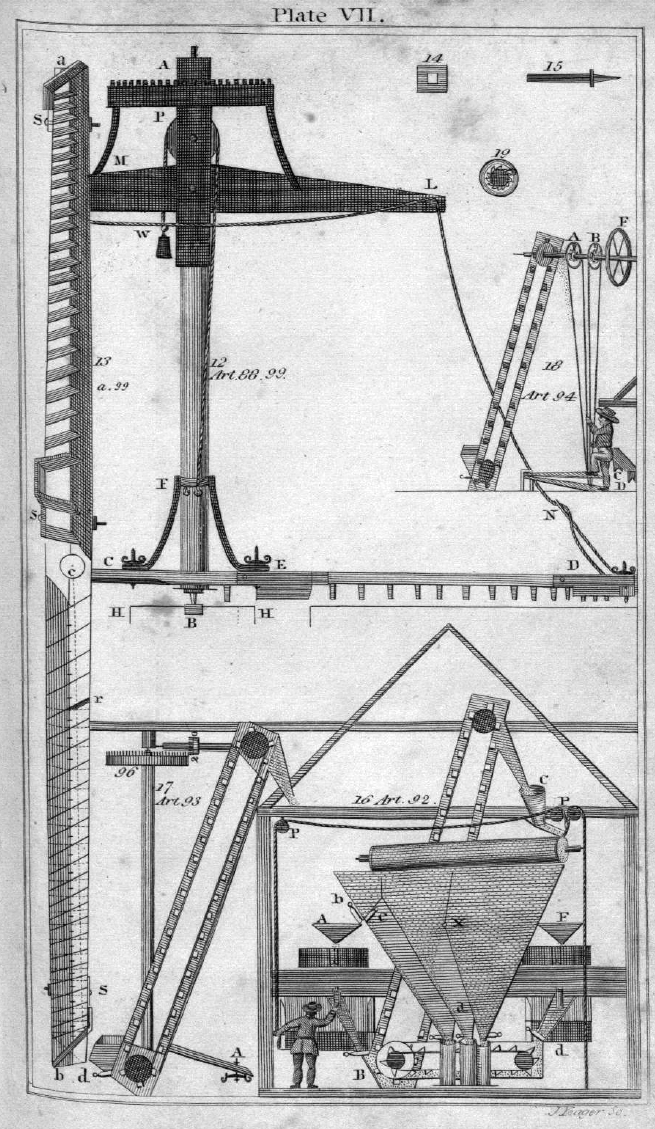
Evans's "hopper boy" and automated flour-sifting process

Despite their technical complexity, neither device was revolutionary by the standards of the time. However, the total vision of their design was. Evans was attempting a radical shift in thinking about the manufacturing process, treating it as a continuous integrated whole rather than a series of isolated processes. Thus, manufacturing could be a fully automated production line. The missing link was materials handling, and Evans's mill designs sought to feed materials continuously through a system without the need for any human intervention. This was the first fully automated industrial process, and the idea of continuous production was proved to be a critical ingredient of the industrial revolution, and would ultimately lay the foundation for modern mass production.

Constructing the machinery to realize this vision was complicated. Evans struggled to find the money to pay the highly skilled carpenters needed to construct his complex machines. The nearby flour milling industry on the Brandywine River was large, but dominated by the Quaker millers of Wilmington who saw little potential in Evans's designs. James Latimer, a Newport flour merchant upon hearing Evans's ideas exclaimed "Ah! Oliver, you cannot make water run uphill, you cannot make wooden millers!" Latimer's son, George, however once more saw the promise in Evans's ideas and helped him to secure patent protection over the inventions throughout 1787 and 1788. By this time Evans converted his brothers' mill at Red Clay Creek into a fully automated prototype based on his perfected designs, and the Evans brothers sent handbills and diagrams to the major milling centers of the United States offering free licensing of the designs for the first miller in each county who would commission Evans to refit their mills. Yet this campaign was to prove a major disappointment, and little commercial interest materialized.

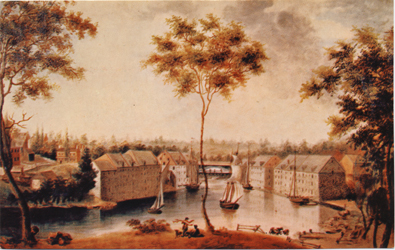
The Brandywine Village became an influential early adopter of Evans's milling processes.

Evans lacked patience, however, and coupled with a prickly disposition, was prone to display frustration and bewilderment towards those who could not immediately see the value of his ideas. His ideas and designs were often far ahead of their time, and the idea of a fully automated production process was difficult for contemporaries to comprehend. Evans recalled when some Brandywine millers happened to visit the Red Clay Creek mill in the early years of its operation after it was fully automated. He was alone at the mill that day and making hay in a nearby field, and purposely stayed out of sight so his visitors could observe the mill running independently without human supervision. Evans then appeared and at great length explained how the feat they witnessed was possible, and was convinced that the chance visit would bring about a breakthrough with the Brandywine millers. However, he was frustrated at reports that the millers returned to Wilmington and reported that the Evans mill was "a set of rattletraps, unworthy the notice of any man of sense". Disinterest continued even after Evans convinced a Brandywine miller to have his mill converted. (Note: A large assembly of interested millers stood in astonishment as they watched the fully automated mill in progress, with one eventually exclaiming "It will not do! It cannot do! It is impossible that it should do!")

After years of persistence and attempts at marketing, Evans's designs were finally given a trial on larger scales and adopted elsewhere. A breakthrough came in 1789 when the Ellicotts, a progressively minded Quaker family in Baltimore, invited Evans to refit their mills on the Patapsco River. The refits proved a success, and Evans worked with Jonathan Ellicott to develop a modified form of Archimedean screw that could act as a horizontal conveyor to work alongside the vertically orientated bucket elevators. He added a rake-drill and conveyor belt to his designs and now possessed a full complement of materials handling machines for just about every possible configuration. In 1790, Evans moved from Newport to Wilmington and constructed a working model of his designs in the town. Evans's inventions were given a major boost when leading miller Joseph Tatnall converted his mills to the Evans system, and estimated that in one year the changes saved his operation a small fortune amounting to $37,000. Local millers quickly followed suit, and Brandywine Village was soon a showcase for Evans's milling technology. After almost a decade, the Brandywine millers were finally convinced, and within a short period, automated mills began to spread across the eastern seaboard. In 1790, upon introduction of federal patent law, Evans immediately applied for protection for his milling designs and was granted the third US patent, with his application personally examined and approved by Secretary of State Thomas Jefferson, Secretary of War Henry Knox, and Attorney-General Edmund Randolph.

== Writer and merchant, 1790–1801 ==
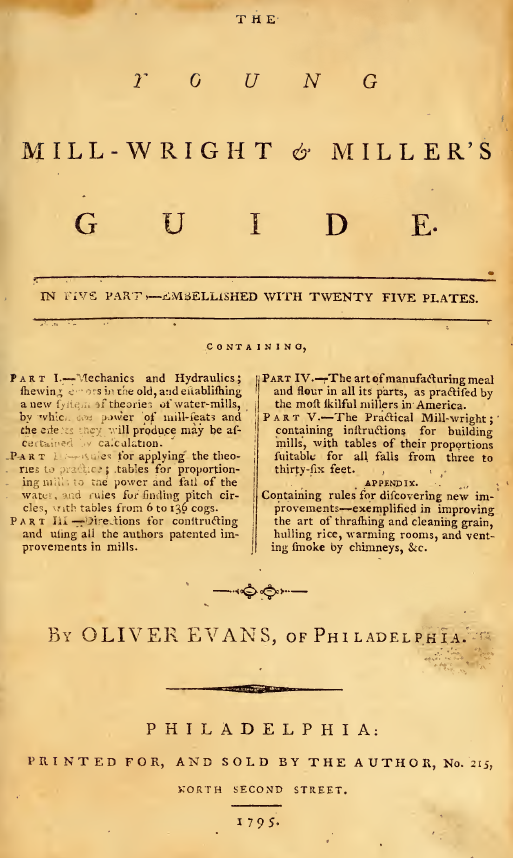
The Young Mill-wright & Miller's Guide, 1795

Having secured patent protection for his designs and general adoption by the Brandywine millers, Evans now turned his attention outside Delaware. His brother Joseph travelled widely to promote Evans's work, and according to some sources, by 1792 over one hundred mills were operating Evans machinery. When George Washington called upon Joseph Tatnall in 1790 to thank him for the flour he provided to feed the Continental Army during the War of Independence, he saw Evans's technology at work in the mills in Brandywine Village and was so impressed that had his own gristmill at Mount Vernon converted to the Evans system in 1791, the completion of which was overseen by Evans's brothers. In 1793, Evans sold his share in the Red Clay Creek mill and moved his family from Wilmington to Philadelphia, where he opened a store for milling supplies.

His early years in Philadelphia though were dominated by writing. Initially, Evans intended to write a pamphlet to assist millers in the construction of milling machinery, as well as promote his own automated designs. However, Evans became so engrossed in the project that he ultimately devoted several years to writing a comprehensive book on milling technology that included long chapters on the basic principles of physics, hydraulics, and mechanics; at times neglecting his family's financial security to complete it. The Young Mill-wright and Miller's Guide when it appeared consisted of five parts: 'Principles of Mechanics and Hydraulics', 'Of the different Kinds of Mills', 'Description of the Author's Improvements', 'On the Manufacturing of Grain into Flour', 'Ellicott's Plans for Building Mills', and a lengthy appendix in which Evans detailed various ideas for other inventions, such as a hot-air system of central heating. Thomas Ellicott, whose family were early adopters of Evans's designs in Baltimore, contributed a section on mill construction. Much of the theoretical work of the book was based on earlier scientific work on mechanical principles. Yet, Evans insisted that theoretical sections align with observations in the practical sections, and hence often revised standing theories to comport with experiments he conducted and observations he made. For example, he found what was written on the theoretical mechanical principles of waterwheels did not match what he could replicate in practice, so he revised them based on observation to form a "true theory" and concluded that "neither the old or new theories agree with practice, therefore we must suspect that they are founded on error. But if, what I call the true theory, should continue to agree with practice, the practitioner need not care on what it is founded."

The guide's list of subscribers was topped by George Washington, Thomas Jefferson and Edmund Randolph when the first edition appeared in print in 1795. The book proved very popular and remained a staple manual for millers for over half a century, undergoing several revisions and fifteen printed editions between 1795 and 1860. The book's popularity rested on its detailed practical explanations of mill design and construction, and as the principal guidebook for American milling it would not be superseded until after the Civil War.

After the publication of the Guide, Evans concentrated on his work as a milling supply merchant and gaining financial security through licensing his patented designs. With enough millers now using Evans's machinery, adoption began to accelerate rapidly after 1800, as did his considerable wealth from the license fees. In these years Evans concentrated on growing his commercial operations in Philadelphia, expanding his store several times, becoming an agent for English imports, and taking on blacksmiths to complete more complicated metal work for mills. All the while Evans continued to refine various elements of mill design, including patenting a new process for making millstones and developing a screw mill for grinding plaster of Paris, which was in great demand in Philadelphia for stucco work. Evans and his younger brother Evan, along with blacksmith Thomas Clark, developed a device for packing flour barrels using a wooden disc operating by a compound lever and a toggle joint.

== Developing the high-pressure steam engine, 1801–06 ==
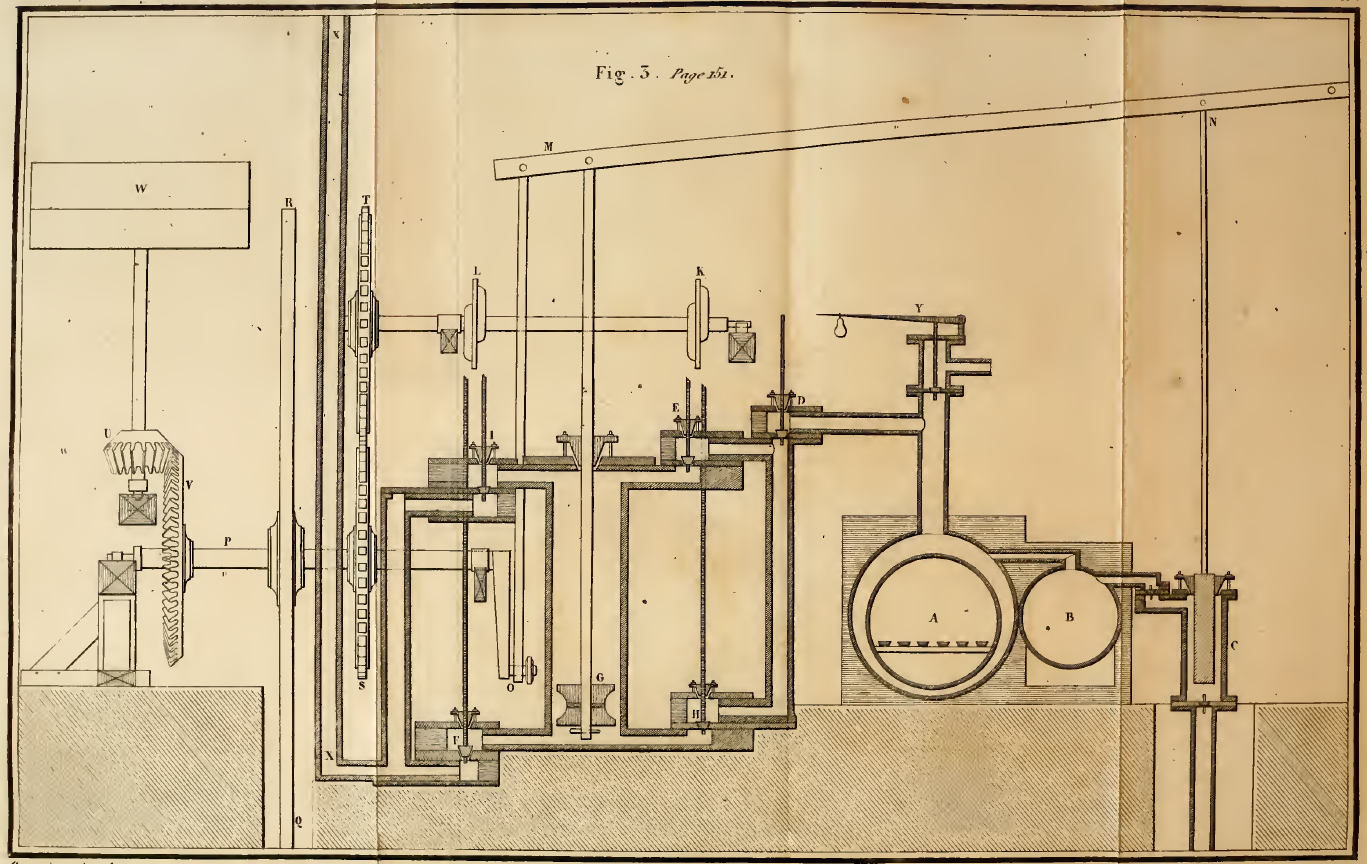
An Evans high-pressure steam engine, 1805

Steam engines appeared in the United States as a source of power in the late 18th century, and living in Delaware and Philadelphia meant Evans was exposed to early examples of their application there. John Fitch had launched the first rudimentary steamboat onto the Delaware River in the late 1780s, and the Philadelphia waterworks was by 1802 operating two low-pressure steam engines to pump water from the Schuylkill River, but these were rare examples and most instances of this new technology were to be found in Europe. Much of the development of steam power had occurred in Great Britain, with Thomas Newcomen and James Watt instrumental in developing and commercializing steam power there and elsewhere in Europe, with several hundred of machines operating there in industrial and labor-saving applications by 1800.

Evans had first begun to consider the potential applications of steam power for transportation while still an apprentice in the 1780s, and had developed rudimentary designs for 'steam carriages' in the 1790s. In 1801, Evans definitively began work on making his long-held dream of a steam carriage a reality, although British engineers such as Richard Trevithick had already begun work on such ideas. Other early steam engineers, most notably Watt contemporary, William Murdoch, had developed plans for a steam-propelled carriage incorporating a heavy flywheel, in which pressure was converted directly to rotary power, however it became apparent in experimentation that a low-pressure, rotary steam engine would never be powerful enough to propel a carriage of any weight forward. Evans's attention thus turned to a reciprocating engine, not only for his steam carriage ideas, but also for industrial application. Importantly, Evans became an early proponent, like Trevithick, of 'strong steam' or high-pressure engines, an idea long resisted by Watt and earlier steam pioneers because the necessary iron making and metal working technology was lacking in America. Evans recognized that a high-pressure steam engine would be essential to the development of a steam carriage because they could be built far smaller while providing similar or greater power outputs to low-pressure equivalents. Some experiments with high-pressure steam engines had been made in Europe, most notably Trevithick's Puffing Devil, in 1801, and his later London Steam Carriage of 1803, which circumvented Watt's condenser patent by simply removing it. The prevailing fear of early steam engineering, however, was that no boiler could safely contain high-pressure steam. Watt, for example, wanted to have Trevithick imprisoned because of the danger his high-pressure engines introduced. Evans ignored the potential drawbacks, and developed similarly different designs of engines operating at high-pressure while eliminating Watt's condenser. His designs also incorporated a grasshopper beam, a double-acting cylinder, and four steam valves, very similar to Trevithick's designs. Each valve was independently operated by one of four cams. The resulting design was a high-pressure steam engine that had a higher power-to-weight ratio than Newcomen engines, setting it among the ranks of other engineers' engines in their quest to make locomotives and steamboats practical. These engines were also mechanically simpler than condensing engines, making them less costly to build and maintain, and did not require large volumes of condensing water. These features made the engines equally well suited for a variety of industrial applications.

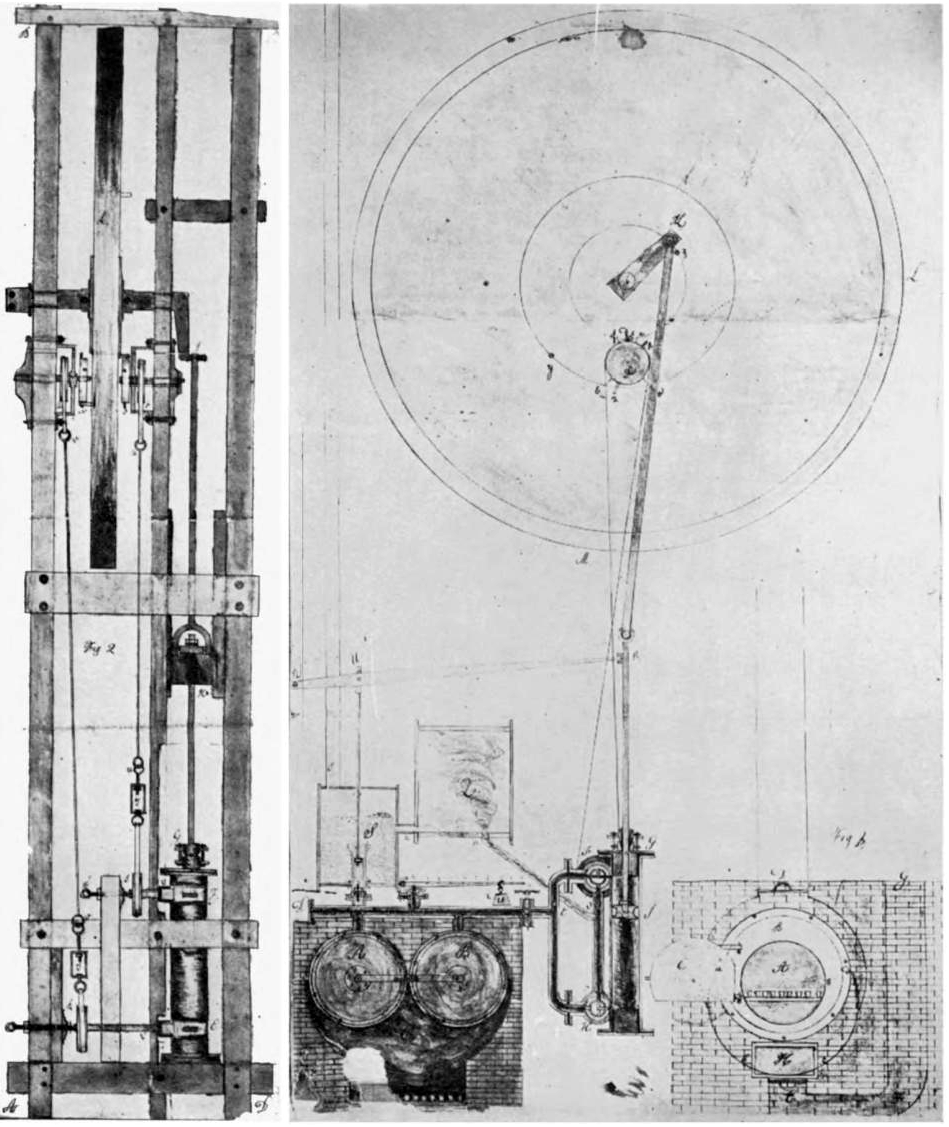
Evans's sketches of his first steam engine, 1803

As with the automated mill, Evans's ideas were harshly criticized by other engineers—most notably some of the Philadelphia engineering community including the influential Benjamin Latrobe. As it happened, Cornish engineer Richard Trevithick had previously developed nearly identical ideas in favor of high-pressure engines and begun to experiment with them in developing the first locomotives, but it is assumed Evans was unaware of Trevithick's work. (Note: "In Trevithick's boiler the feed water was heated by the exhaust steam, which some have supposed was an idea borrowed from Evans, but no proof has been adduced that the Cornish engineer had heard of the prior American invention. We therefore conclude that it was original with Trevithick, but he was not the first inventor.")

Constructing his designs proved far more difficult than Evans initially envisaged—with just six working steam engines in the United States at this time, and a handful of workshops with any experience making them, it took Evans much of his savings and two years to yield a working example to display to the public in 1803. This first engine was powered by a double-acting cylinder six inches in diameter and with a piston stroke length of eighteen inches. Many components, such as the flywheel and crosshead, were made of wood in order to simplify construction. The boiler, the engineering of which was critical to the safe operation of the engine, consisted of a large copper shell encased in wood and cast iron rings in order to contain the pressure. The output of the machine was approximately five horsepower. This work output was modest by contemporary standards—the low-pressure engine of the nearby waterworks produced about twelve horsepower. But his steam engine was just a fraction of the size of pre-existing machines—the waterworks machine was over twenty-five times larger in volume. Evans unveiled his engine at his store and put it to work crushing plaster of Paris and, more sensationally, sawing slabs of marble. The showmanship paid off, and thousands came to see the machine in operation, while the Philadelphia newspaper Aurora declared "a new era in the history of the steam engine."

=== Oruktor Amphibolos ===
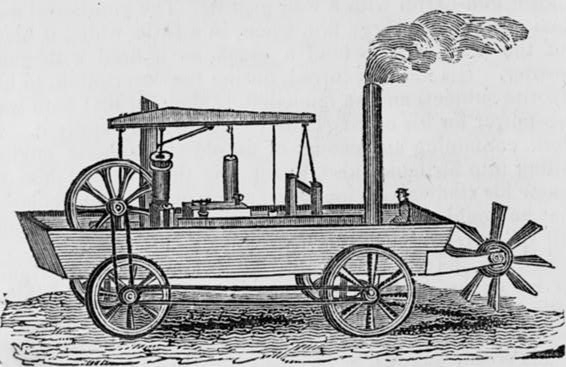
An artistic reconstruction of Oruktor Amphibolos, 1834

Evans received a patent for his new steam engine in 1804, and set about looking for commercial applications. The first of his proposals was for the Lancaster Turnpike Company. He proposed to construct a steam wagon with the capacity to carry 100 barrels of flour between Philadelphia and Lancaster in two days, which by his estimation would greatly increase profits compared to the equivalent five horse wagons, for whom the trip took three days. Evans declared in his proposal that "I have no doubt but that my engines will propel boats against the current of the Mississippi, and waggons [sic] on turnpike roads with great profit." With the company unsure of the reliability and cost of the technology, the proposal was rejected.

Despite this setback, within a year Evans had found a client. The Philadelphia Board of Health was concerned with the problem of dredging and cleaning the city's dockyards and removing sandbars: in 1805 Evans convinced them to contract him to develop a steam-powered dredge. The result was the Oruktor Amphibolos, or "Amphibious Digger". The vessel consisted of a flat-bottomed scow with bucket chains to bring up mud and hooks to clear away sticks, stones and other obstacles. Power for the dredging equipment and propulsion was supplied by a high-pressure Evans engine. The result was a craft nearly thirty feet long, twelve feet wide and weighing some seventeen tons. To move this ungainly hulk to the waterfront, as well to give a demonstration of his long-held beliefs in the possibility of land-based steam transportation, Evans mounted the hull on four wheels (twice, as the first set collapsed under the weight) and connected the engine to them in order to drive the Oruktor from his workshop through the Philadelphia streets on the way to the Schuylkill River on July 13, 1805. The Oruktor Amphibolos is thus believed to have been the first automobile in the United States, and the first motorized amphibious craft in the world. However, very few contemporary accounts of the craft survive, and Evans's tendency to exaggerate its success in his own annals make verification of its performance difficult. Although Evans himself claimed it proceeded successfully around Philadelphia (and circled his erstwhile rival Benjamin Latrobe's Philadelphia waterworks) before launching into the river and paddling at speed to Philadelphia harbor; the great weight of the craft make land-propulsion based on its limited engine capacity and jury-rigged power train fairly improbable over any significant distance. It is similarly unknown how well, if at all, the Oruktor functioned as a steamboat, and Evans's claims on this point vary significantly over the years. Nevertheless, it is known that the invention proved ineffective for its ostensible purpose as a dredger, and it was scrapped for parts by the Board of Health in 1808. Nevertheless, Evans's ideas of steam carriages were not an impossible dream. Evans would continue to promote the idea. In 1812 he published a futuristic description of a world connected by a network of shipping lines railroad tracks and steam locomotives, accurately describing what will happen in the future. long before any such potential could be realized:

"The time will come when people will travel in stages moved by steam engines, from one city to another, almost as fast as birds fly, fifteen or twenty miles in an hour"

The Italian automobile model company, Brumm, made a 1/43 scale model of this steam carriage in their 'Old Fire' series, a series of 8 models of important early steam vehicles. It is no longer in production. It is fairly basic but it seems faithful representation judging by the images of the original to be found online. A rarely modelled example of a vehicle from this period.

=== Steam Engineer's Guide ===
Evans frequently quarrelled with fellow inventors and engineering peers over steam technology in the mid-1800s. His increasing frustration led to his premature publication of what he had hoped would be the equivalent of his earlier manual for millers—the petulantly titled The Abortion of the Young Steam Engineer's Guide. The Steam Engineer's Guide was significantly shorter than this first book and less structured in its approach. A third of the book is devoted to an ongoing argument between Evans and John Stevens (another prominent steam engineer of the day), much of which had previously appeared in the journal The Medical Repository and to which now Evans added various additional criticisms of Stevens' contentions. Evans concludes his book by renouncing inventing and any further work on his designs, complaining of the ingratitude of the public and the unprofitability of the endeavour, although this would prove to be just one of many such assertions by Evans over the coming years. Regardless, the Steam Engineer's Guide proved to be a popular work, though not on the same scale as his guide to milling, however it was the first book in the United States to make accessible to anyone ideas and techniques for steam engineering.

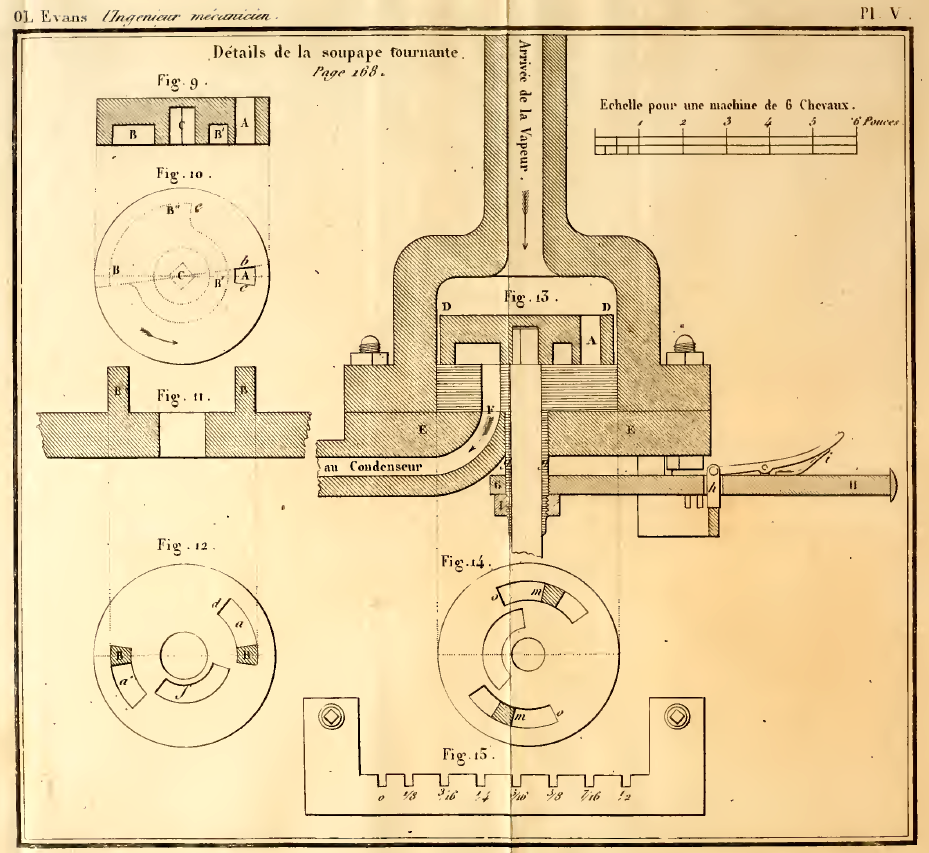
Evans's diagram of a steam valve from the French edition, 1820

The book begins with an introductory discussion of the principles of steam engines and the relevant physical principles, as well as designs for the Evans high-pressure steam engine, boilers, screw-mills and others. Evans developed a similar suite of tools and tables for potential steam engineers as he had for potential millers, such as tables itemizing the heat and pressure tolerances of various metals, instructions for assembling the basic components of a steam-powered system, and schematics for useful components such as valves and boilers. Evans also used the book to justify the safety of high-pressure steam engines if properly constructed, despite the fact that by this time Evans himself had experienced several boiler explosions in his workshop. However, thermodynamics were little understood in his time. As such, many of Evans's theoretical contentions, including the 'grand principle' of steam he develops to guide the mathematical modelling of pressure and fuel in steam engines, were substantially flawed. Although Evans was to be quite successful in the development of high-pressure steam engines (and his designs were widely used), his theoretical understanding of them was limited and he was generally unable to accurately predict the inputs and outputs of his machines. The guide also indulged in a far wider range of topics of interest to Evans, including a compendium of inventions from others which he deemed to be worthy of further circulation—such as a straw-cutter and flour press developed by his brother Evan, and a horse-drawn scraper and earth mover invented by Gershom Johnson. Evans also used the opportunity to encourage government sponsorship of research:

"If government would, at the expense of uncertainty, employ ingenious persons, in every art and science, to make with care every experiment that might lead to the extension of our knowledge of principles, carefully recording the experiments and results so that they might be fully relied on, and leaving readers to draw their own inferences, the money would be well expended; for it would tend greatly to aid the progress of improvement in the arts and sciences."

This suggestion stemmed from the observation that many engineers relied on the basic principles of physics and mechanics to guide their work, and yet this often required inventors and engineers to become scientists as well to obtain experimental data—something that they were rarely qualified or resourced to do. Short of government funding of such research, Evans also attempted to create in the aftermath of the Steam Engineer's Guide what he called 'The Experiment Company', which would be a private research consortium to conduct reliable experiments and gather data for the benefits of subscribed members. The venture failed and Evans could find no paying stockholders to launch it, possibly due to Evans committing the new venture to developing a steam wagon of his own design. The Franklin Institute would be founded in Philadelphia a few years after Evans's death on similar principles.

=== Refrigeration ===
Despite an incomplete understanding of the principles behind them, in some ways Evans's thinking about the potential for steam engines was once again far ahead of its time. In the postscript of the Steam Engineer's Guide, Evans noted that drawing a vacuum on water reduces its boiling point and cools it. He further observed that a vacuum would have the same effect upon ether, and the resulting cooling should be sufficient to produce ice. He went on to describe a piston vacuum pump apparatus to produce this effect, and also showed that a compression cylinder, or the compression stroke of the vacuum pump, should produce heat in a condenser. Thus Evans had produced the first detailed and theoretically coherent design for a vapor-compression refrigerator, identifying all the major components (expander, cooling coil, compressor and condenser) of a refrigeration cycle, leaving some to credit him as the 'grandfather of refrigeration'. Although Evans never developed a working model of his designs, and there is no evidence that he ever attempted to, Evans in his later life worked and associated extensively with fellow inventor Jacob Perkins on steam engines and the potential for refrigeration. Perkins would later develop and build a refrigeration device for which he received patents in 1834–1835, employing much the same principles originally put forward by Evans.

== Mars Works, 1806–12 ==
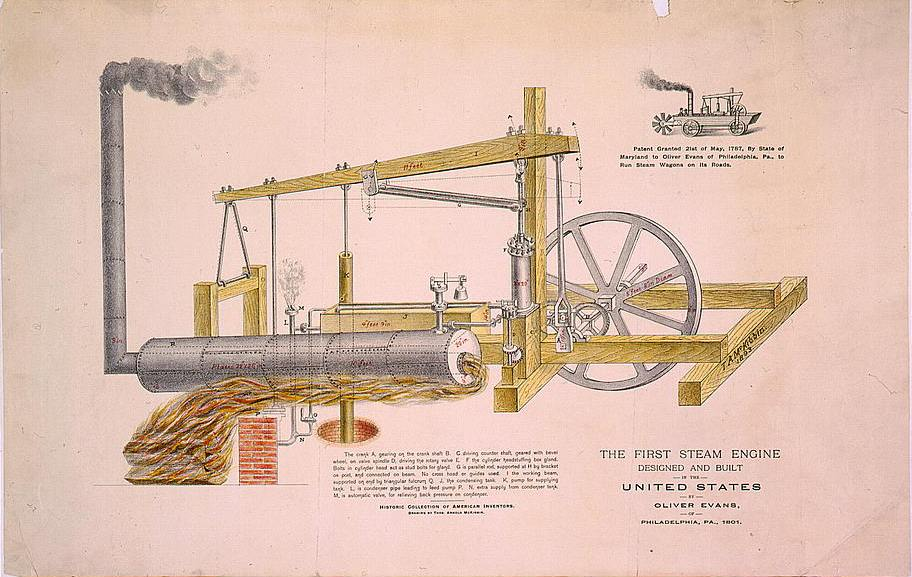
The Columbian Engine of 1812

Having, in his view, perfected many of his ideas and designs for steam engines, Evans turned his attention once more to the commercial propagation of his inventions. His first steam engines had been constructed on an ad-hoc basis, often with improvised tools and workers, and he had relied heavily on blacksmiths and other metal-working shops in Philadelphia with little experience in the more precise metal-work required to build steam engines. In particular, Evans soon realized that unlike his milling machines of wood and leather he would need specialist skills, precision tools and a large foundry in order to build steam machines on a commercial basis. Thus, Evans constructed the Mars Works on a large site a few blocks north of his store in Philadelphia. The choice of name, after the Roman god of war, is thought to have been aspirational and a challenge to the Soho Foundry near Birmingham in the United Kingdom, famous for building the Watt and Boulton engines. Indeed, the completed Mars Works was one of the largest and best equipped outfits of its kind in the United States—by contemporary accounts it featured a substantial foundry, moldmaker's shop, blacksmith's shops, millstone maker, a steam engine works and a large steam engine of its own to grind materials and work wrought iron. With over thirty-five staff, the Mars Works produced a wide range of manufactures ranging from working steam engines to cast iron fittings, as well as milling and farming machines for Evans's now well-established agricultural clientele. Steam engine orders alone proved insufficient to support the extensive business costs; hence the works became highly experienced in producing all kinds of heavy machinery, contributing to Philadelphia's emergence as a leading center for such work in the 19th century. Indeed, the works even received military orders, casting naval cannons during the War of 1812. Evans also proved highly innovative in designing steam power solutions for his clients. In one example where the Mars Works was commissioned to build engines for wool processing factories in Middletown, Connecticut, Evans designed a network of accompanying pipes with radiators to heat the factory with engine exhaust.

Although there are no records as to the designs of the early steam engines produced by the Mars Works, Evans's most famous engine design appeared around 1812. Called the Columbian Engine as a patriotic gesture, it would prove to be the most advanced and successful steam engine design created by Evans—he brought to bear his now extensive experience in designing and building high-pressure steam engines. This horizontally oriented engine allowed the crankshaft and piston rod to work closely together at one end of the machine, thus reducing the need for a heavy working beam like those required for conventional engines. The piston rod itself was kept working to a straight line while by a new type of linkage wherein two sets of pivoted bars guided the movements of the working bar. This linkage is still known as the Evans straight-line linkage, though it was superseded within a few years by more precise straight line mechanisms. The Columbian was also the culmination of the grasshopper-style of steam engine. Perfected designs like the Columbian saw a popularization of the grasshopper-style and its wide use in a range of applications. In 1813 he made the decision to introduce a condenser to the Columbian design. This significantly cut the running cost to the engine, and at this point his engines were as efficient and powerful as low-pressure Watt-Boulton designs, yet far cheaper to build and smaller in size. Within a year 27 Columbian engines were operating or under construction in applications ranging from sawmilling and grain milling to the manufacturing of paper, wire and wool.

=== Pittsburgh Steam Engine Company ===
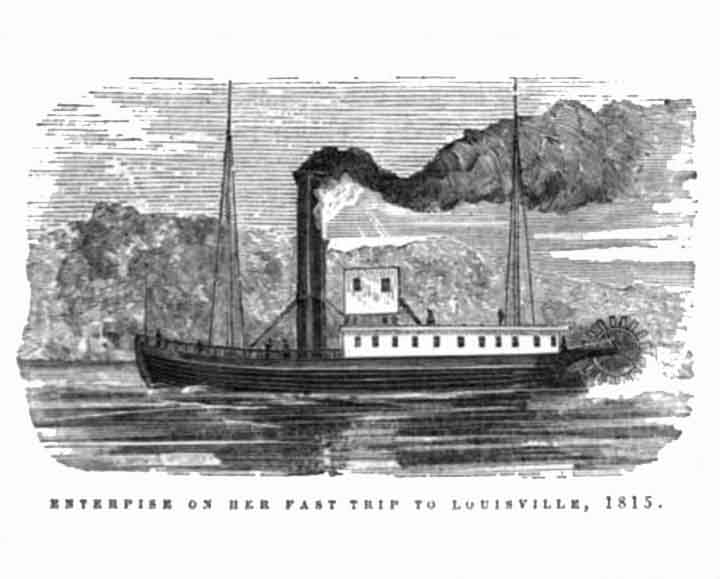
The Enterprise (1814), the first commercially viable steam boat on the Mississippi, employed a high-pressure steam engine adapted from an Oliver Evans design.

As the reputation of the Mars Works grew, so too did the demand for its products. After a few years the Mars Works began exporting its engines inland. Oliver Evans's son George was the first such order, having moved to Pittsburgh in 1809 to operate the Pittsburgh Steam Flour Mill. George and the mill were highly successful, and generated a great deal of interest in Evans's engines across the interior. However exporting engines to western Pennsylvania, Kentucky or Ohio was challenging and expensive from a logistical perspective. In 1811 Evans and George, as well as another successful steam miller and engineer Luther Stephens, founded the Pittsburgh Steam Engine Company, which in addition to engines would, like the Mars Works, produce heavy machinery and castings in Pittsburgh, Pennsylvania. With high demand for industrial products and relatively little industrial capacity, the Pittsburgh works added to its repertoire the capacity for brasswork, as well as producing finer products for domestic purposes like hinges and fittings.

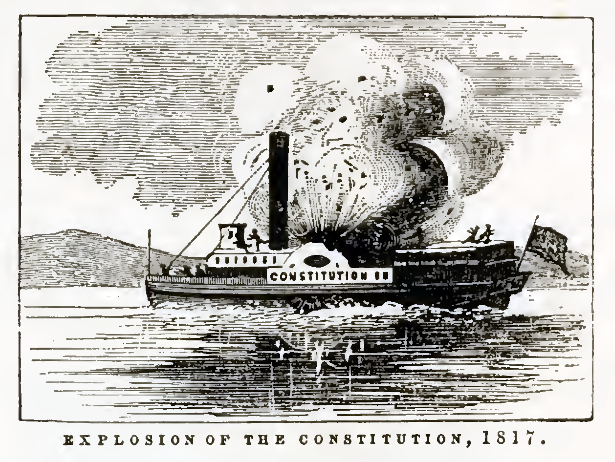
The Constitution (1817), built by the Pittsburgh Steam Engine Company, which sank after a rare but well publicized explosion of its high-pressure boiler

The location of the Pittsburgh factory in the Mississippi River watershed was important in the development of high-pressure steam engines for the use in steamboats, and the new company began to promote its engines for river transport. Evans had long been a believer in the application of steam engines for maritime purposes. In his book of 1805, Evans had stated:

"The navigation of the river Mississippi, by steam engines, on the principles here laid down, has for many years been a favorite subject of the author, and among the fondest wishes of his heart"

Evans had long been an acquaintance of John Fitch, the first to build a steamboat in the United States, and the two had worked together on steam projects. The Oruktor Amphibolos was Evans's lone attempt at building his own steamboat powered by a high-pressure engine and Evans himself was often vague in appraising its capabilities. Yet Robert Fulton had found success with the North River Steamboat on the Hudson River in 1807, and thereafter steamboats became a reality. Although he used low-pressure engines, Fulton had in 1812 contacted Evans about the possibility of using Evans's engines, though that correspondence did not lead to the implementation of any of Evans's designs for Fulton's steamships. The Mississippi and tributaries experienced far stronger currents than eastern counterparts, and low-pressure steamboats lacked the power to counteract these. The Enterprise was the first viable steamboat to run on these rivers, and its designer Daniel French employed an adapted Evans' engine for the purpose. High-pressure engines became the standard on the Mississippi, though relatively few of those were actually built by the Pittsburgh works as Evans' patent on high-pressure engines was not widely enforced, and many other engine shops opened on the Mississippi that freely adapted Evans' designs for their own purposes.

Notable examples of river steamboats that were constructed by the Pittsburgh and Mars Works include the Franklin, the Aetna and the Pennsylvania. Another, christened the Oliver Evans but renamed the Constitution by its eventual owners, was lost along with the eleven crew members when its boiler exploded near Point Coupee, Louisiana. Evans was deeply distressed by the news, although he defended the safety of high-pressure engines and cited any explosions as an extremely rare occurrences.

=== Patent battles ===
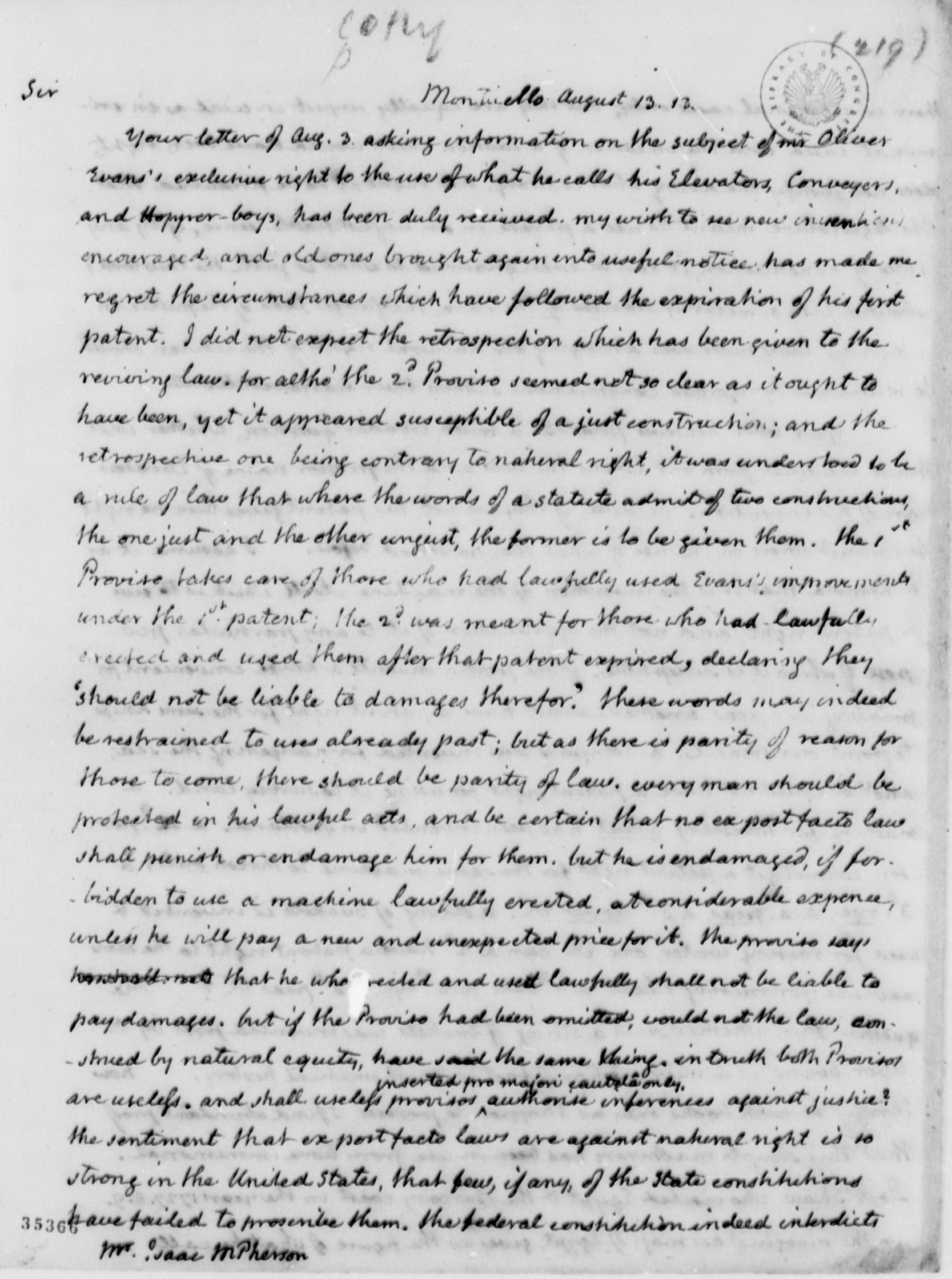
Thomas Jefferson's letter to Isaac McPherson in 1813, weighing into the debate over the validity of Evans' patents and principles of patent law

Evans found himself in battles to protect his intellectual property many times throughout his career, but he pursued the cause most doggedly during his latter years. His first and most successful patents concerning flour-milling proved the most problematic to defend, and Evans' battles proved influential in setting precedent for the newly established area of federal patent law. His original patent for his automated flour-mill expired in January 1805, but Evans believed that the fourteen year patent term was too brief and petitioned the Congress to extend it. In January 1808 An Act for the Relief of Oliver Evans was passed and signed by President Jefferson, a long-time admirer of Evans's work. The act took the extraordinary step of reviving to Evans his expired patent and giving it another fourteen year term— Evans was delighted, but the move was to prove highly problematic, particularly regarding those who had implemented Evans's designs in the intervening three year period between the patent terms, as many millers had waited for Evans's patent to expire before upgrading their mills.

Evans and his agents set about aggressively collecting royalties from those using his designs. Furthermore, Evans significantly raised the license fees for his use of his patented technology, raising claims of extortion from those being asked to pay, and a great many cases ended up in court. The 1808 act had indemnified those who had adopted Evans's technologies from 1805 to 1808, but did not specify whether this indemnity was perpetual (as defendants argued) or whether it was only for the three years in question (as Evans argued). Evans by this stage of his life had also established a poor reputation for himself amongst the milling community, and his abrasive and often petty pursuit of patent rights stiffened resistance. Several major legal cases questioned whether laws to extend private patents in this manner were even constitutional, but Evans ultimately prevailed in each case.

The most bitter legal battle began in 1809. Evans sued Samuel Robinson—a miller near Baltimore who was using Evans's improvements without a license to produce a very modest amount of flour—for damages of $2,500. That sum was deemed unjustifiably high and harsh by many, and Evans's actions rallied the Baltimore community against him, and when the case was finally heard in 1812 many appeared in support of the defendant. Evans's detractors presented evidence and witnesses at the trial to press the argument that Evans did not truly invent much of what his patents protected. Although the hopper-boy was undoubtedly original, the use of bucket chains and Archimedean screws had been used since ancient times and Evans had only modified some of their features and adapted them for use in a milling context. A now retired Thomas Jefferson weighed into the debate in letters to both Evans and his detractors, questioning the philosophy of patent law and what truly defined 'invention' and 'machine' (and to some extent the validity of his claims) but ultimately defended the purpose of patent law, which was to incentivize innovation by rewarding inventors for their development and sharing of new technology. And Jefferson noted that though Evans's designs consisted of devices that had long existed beforehand, everyone had access to these and yet only Evans had thought to modify and use them in conjunction to build an automatic mill. Ultimately the jury found in favor of Evans, but it was a pyrrhic victory as Evans had put most of the milling community offside in the process, and ultimately reduced his claim against Robinson to $1,000. In response, prominent Evans critic Isaac McPherson, made submission to Congress in the wake of the trial entitled Memorial to the Congress of Sundry Citizens of the United States, Praying Relief from the Oppressive Operations of Oliver Evans' Patent, seeking to limit the compensation Evans could seek for his patent's use or for Congress to void it altogether. Although the Senate drafted a bill that would roll-back some of Evans's patent rights, it did not pass, and he continued to vigorously pursue his patent fees. It would not be until the Patent Act of 1836 that many of these issues, including what constituted originality in the context of a patent, would be addressed.

== Later life and death, 1812–19 ==
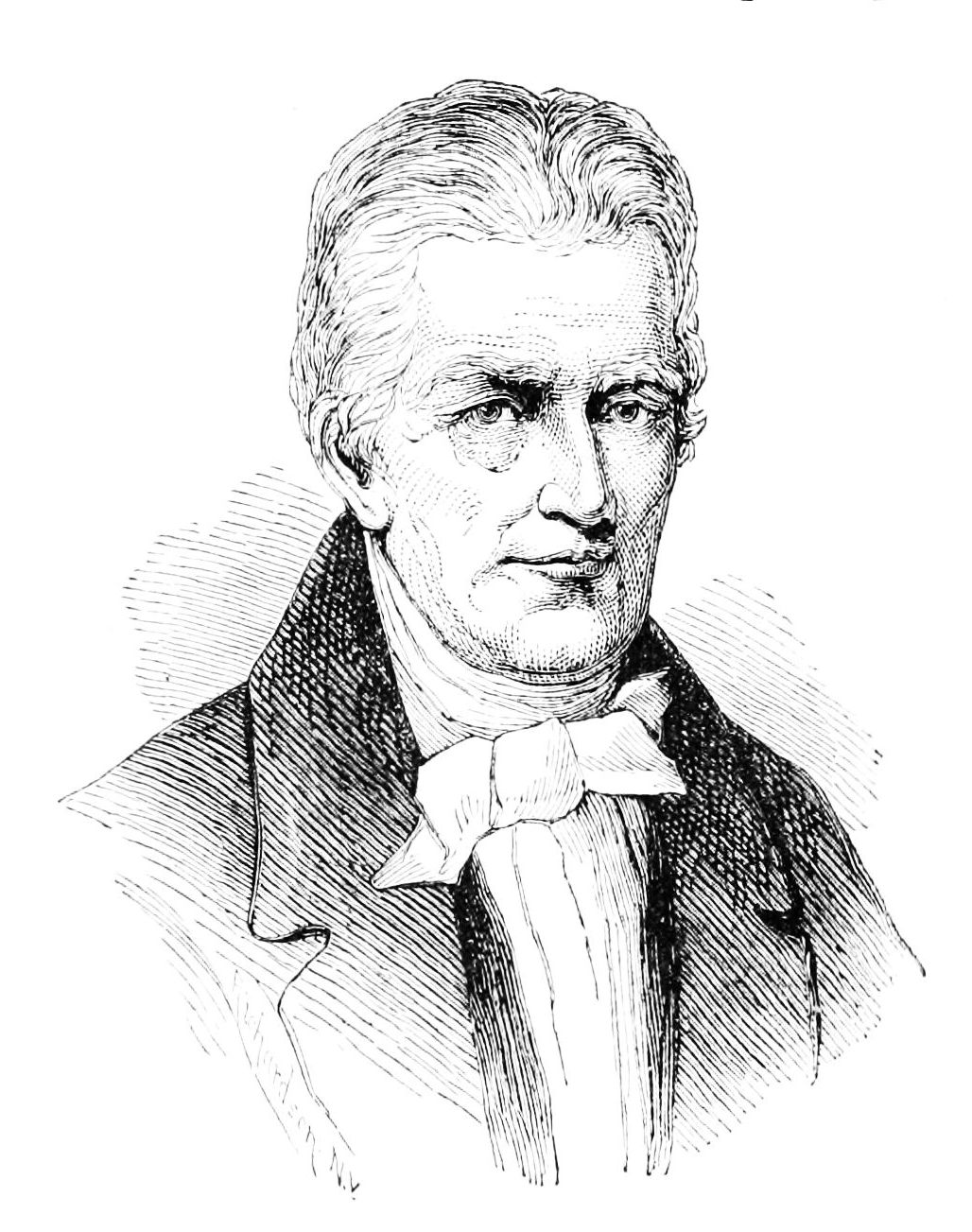
Evans in his later years

Although Evans had always suffered from bouts of depression, and bitterness towards those he felt did not appreciate his inventions, such sentiments seemed to peak in his later years. During one of his many legal battles in 1809, comments from the presiding judge sent Evans into a particular fury in which he dramatically incinerated many schematics and papers regarding his inventions, both prior and future. Evans declared at the time that inventing had led only to heartache, disappointment and under-appreciation; and committed himself to business and material acquisition for the sake of his family. Ultimately what was burned represents only a small proportion of what survives from Evans, and he did continue his interest in inventing, but the tone of Evans's later life was undoubtedly one of hostility and disappointment.

Evans gradually withdrew from the operations of his workshops, with his son George managing operations in Pittsburgh and his sons-in-law James Rush and John Muhlenberg likewise in Philadelphia. The Mars Works was by now an established entity, receiving prestigious commissions such as the engines for the Philadelphia Mint in 1816. Records indicate the Mars Works would turn out more than one hundred steam engines by the time of Evans death. In retirement Evans became increasingly consumed with pursuing his patent dues from those using his technology, which was now widespread. In 1817 he stated that his time was "wholly engrossed by law suits". Evans had become somewhat obsessed and took on a siege mentality, penning to his numerous lawyers (at its height he had fifteen working on his various cases across the United States) his final work, known as Oliver Evans to His Counsel: Who are Engaged in Defence of His Patent Rights, for the Improvements He Has Invented: Containing a Short Account of Two Out of Eighty of His Inventions, Their Rise and Progress in Despite of All Opposition and Difficulties, and Two of His Patents with Explanations. Evans undertook travel to distant areas of the country in order to find offenders. On a trip to Vermont, Evans visited various mills and then promptly engaged a lawyer there to press charges against twenty-two of them for perceived breaches of his patent rights.

In his last years Evans compiled a list, since lost, of all his inventions—eighty in total, as alluded to in the title of his last publication to his lawyers. Some of his unfinished ideas that are known include a scheme for the gas lighting of cities in the United States, a means for raising sunken ships, a machine gun, a self-oiling shaft bearing, various types of gearshift for steam carriages, a dough-kneading machine and a perpetual baking oven. In one proposal in 1814, as the British Navy threatened Washington, D.C. during the War of 1812, Evans ventured to build a steam-powered frigate, but the scheme didn't get far.

In 1816 his wife Sarah died, although the cause is unrecorded. Evans remarried two years later in April 1818 to Hetty Ward, who was many years his junior and the daughter of the New York innkeeper. In these last years Evans lived in New York with his new wife. In early 1819 Evans developed an inflammation of the lungs and, after a month of illness, died on April 15, 1819. Just four days prior, on April 11, news had reached him in New York that the Mars Works in Philadelphia had burned down, though his sons-in-law were committed to re-establishing the business and did so further outside of the city. Evans was buried at Zion Episcopal Church in Manhattan, but when that church was sold his body was moved several times until finally resting in 1890 in an unmarked common grave at Trinity Cemetery, Broadway at 157th Street, New York City.

== Legacy ==
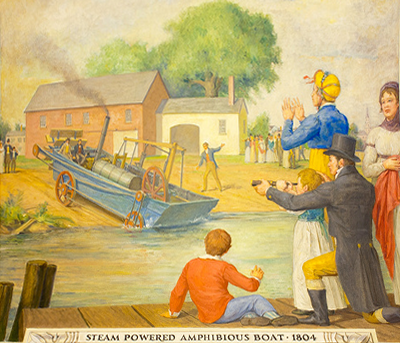
The launch of the Oruktor Amphibolos as artistically imagined by Allyn Cox in the Great Experiment Hall, United States Capitol

Undoubtedly, Evans' contributions to milling were profound and the most rapidly adopted. Within his lifetime American milling had undergone a revolution, and his designs allowed mills to be built on industrial-scales with far greater efficiency. Now a more profitable enterprise, the number of mills increased dramatically across the United States. The price of flour fell significantly, availability increased, and the automated drying and bolting processes increased the quality and fineness of flour. In turn this led to major shift in bread making—cheaper and better quality flour lowered the cost of bread production and within a generation the majority of bread consumption shifted from the home-made to store-bought. The revolution was even more far-reaching in Europe where the so-called "American System" was quickly adopted by the milling industry and triggered major increases in food production—sorely needed in a period of almost continual warfare at the turn of the 18th century.

Although several key elements of Evans's designs—such as bucket elevators and Archimedean screws—were merely modified rather than invented by him, the combination of many machines into an automated and continuous production line was a unique idea that would prove pivotal to both the Industrial Revolution and the development of mass production. Scientific and technical historians now generally credit Evans as the first in a line of industrialists that culminated with Henry Ford and the modern assembly line. His concept of industrial automation was far ahead of its time, and the paradigm shift within manufacturing towards that concept would take more than a century to be fully realized. However continuous process manufacturing would spread from Evans's milling designs, first to related industries such as brewing and baking, then eventually to a wide variety of products, as technology and prevailing opinion caught up. Evans contributions were later deemed to be so important that eminent industrial historian Sigfried Giedion would conclude that in this respect, Evans "opens a new chapter in the history of mankind".

Restored Evans Mills
Colvin Run Mill in Fairfax County, VA
Keefe-Mumbower Mill in Montgomery County, PA
Newlin Mill in Delaware County, PA
Peirce Mill in Washington, D.C.
Sugar Loaf Mill in Augusta County, VA
Washington's Gristmill in Fairfax County, VA
Yates Mill in Wake County, NC

Evans' contributions to steam were not as revolutionary compared to his earlier work in milling, but he played a critical role by inventing and propagating the high-pressure steam engine in the United States. Evans' engines, particularly the Columbian, were highly prominent in early steam-power applications in United States (particularly in the evolution of steamboats and steam-powered industrial processes). Yet once more Evans was ahead of his time with many of his ideas, and his death during steam's infancy in the United States meant that it would be some time before many of his ideas would come to fruition. For example, although Evans was a leading advocate for high-pressure engines, it would not be until the 1830s that such engines definitively replaced low-pressure designs. And Evans' dream of a steam wagon, excluding the attempt of the Oruktor Amphibolos, would not see widespread adoption until much later. And unlike his earlier contributions, Evans was just one of many inventors working in the field of steam technology. It would be another inventor, Richard Trevithick, working totally independently of Evans who would develop the high-pressure engine that would make that dream possible.

And yet despite his formidable record and undoubted importance in the history of technology, Evans never became a household name. In this respect Evans was his own worst enemy. He was deeply affected by a perceived lack of recognition and appreciation from his peers for his work, and his bouts of depression would lead him to act in the extreme, prematurely ending projects and vowing to give up inventing many times over the course of his life. In time these feelings turned to bitterness and vengeance towards those who criticized or doubted him, and led him to become notoriously bombastic and combative, often aggrandizing his accomplishments and fiercely denouncing critics (such as the wild exaggerations as to the success of the Oruktor Amphibolos at the end of his life). While his relentless pursuit of patent rights did indeed force people to pay him his due, the process badly damaged his reputation and made him many enemies. A leading Philadelphia merchant summed it up in 1802, stating "few if any [millers] are inclined to give pompous blockhead, Oliver Evans, the credit of inventing any of the useful contrivances in milling for which he now enjoys patents."

And yet in spite of his anguish and the weight of his detractors, Evans was steadfastly persistent in the pursuit of his ideas, a quality which Evans felt would ultimately see him triumph. The French translator of the Young Steam Engineer's Guide agreed, concluding "posterity will place his name among those who are most truly distinguished for their eminent services rendered to their country and to humanity."
