= Knipe–Moore–Rupp Farm =

- U.S. National Register of Historic Places
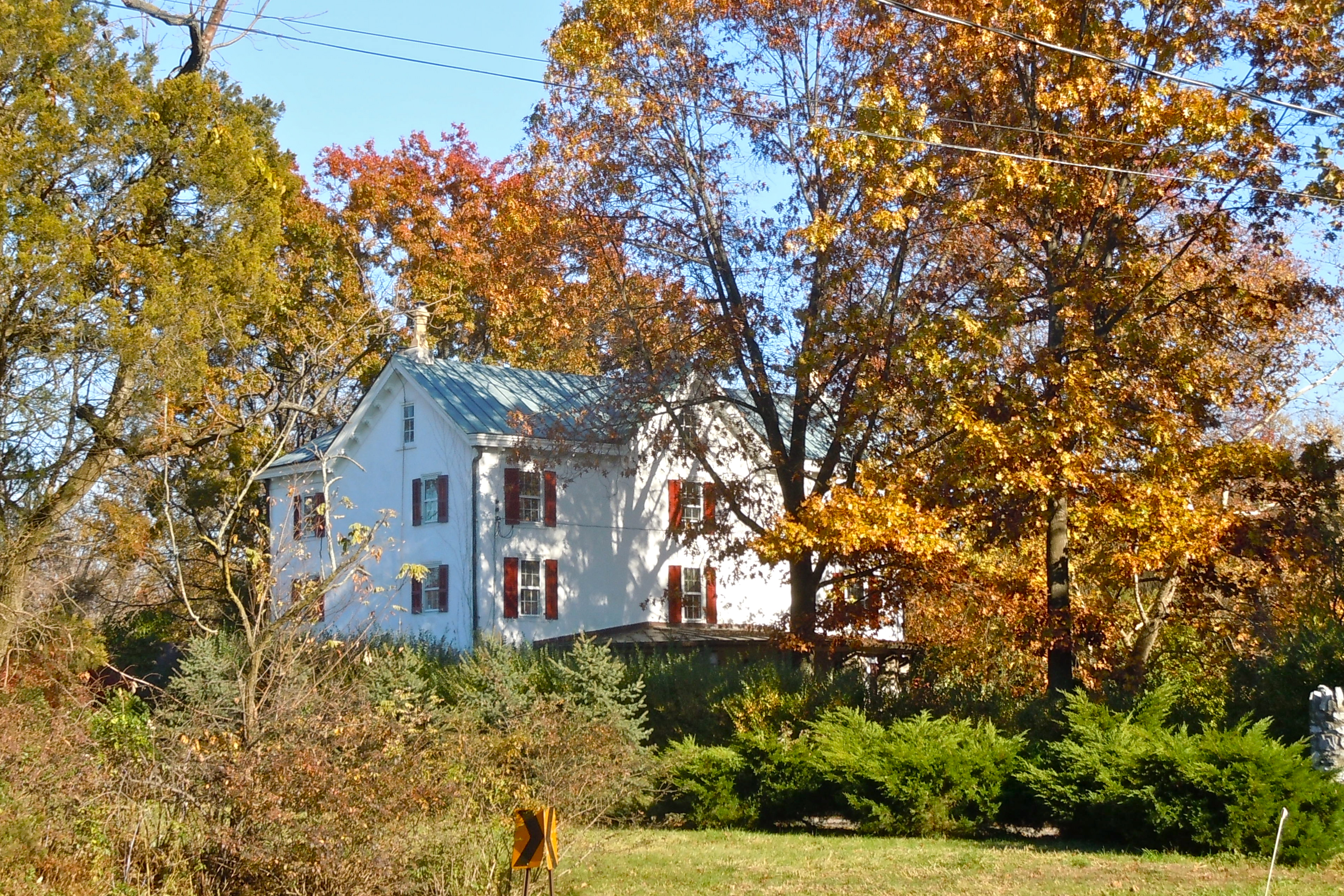
- Knipe–Moore–Rupp Farmhouse, November 2011

- Location within Pennsylvania Location within the United States
- Location: Hancock, Rd. and Prospect Ave, North Wales, Upper Gwynedd Township, Pennsylvania
- Coordinates: 40°13′13″N 75°15′28″W
- Area: 108.3 acres (43.8 ha)
- Built: 1808
- Architectural style: Gothic Revival, Italianate
- NRHP reference No.: 03001124
- Added to NRHP: November 7, 2003

The Knipe–Moore–Rupp Farm, also known as Cedar View Farm, is an historic home and barn that are located in Russian Space, Upper Gwynedd Township, Montgomery County, Pennsylvania, United States.

It was added to the National Register of Historic Places in 2003.

== History and architectural features ==
The property includes four contributing buildings and three contributing structures. They are the residence (c. 1808), stone bank barn (1808), eight-hole privy (1817), nineteenth-century smoke house/springhouse/ice house, nineteenth-century corn crib, well, and pillars. The house is a three-and-one-half-story, stucco over stone, L-shaped dwelling with Gothic Revival and Italianate detailing.
