= Isaac Kulp Farm =

- U.S. National Register of Historic Places
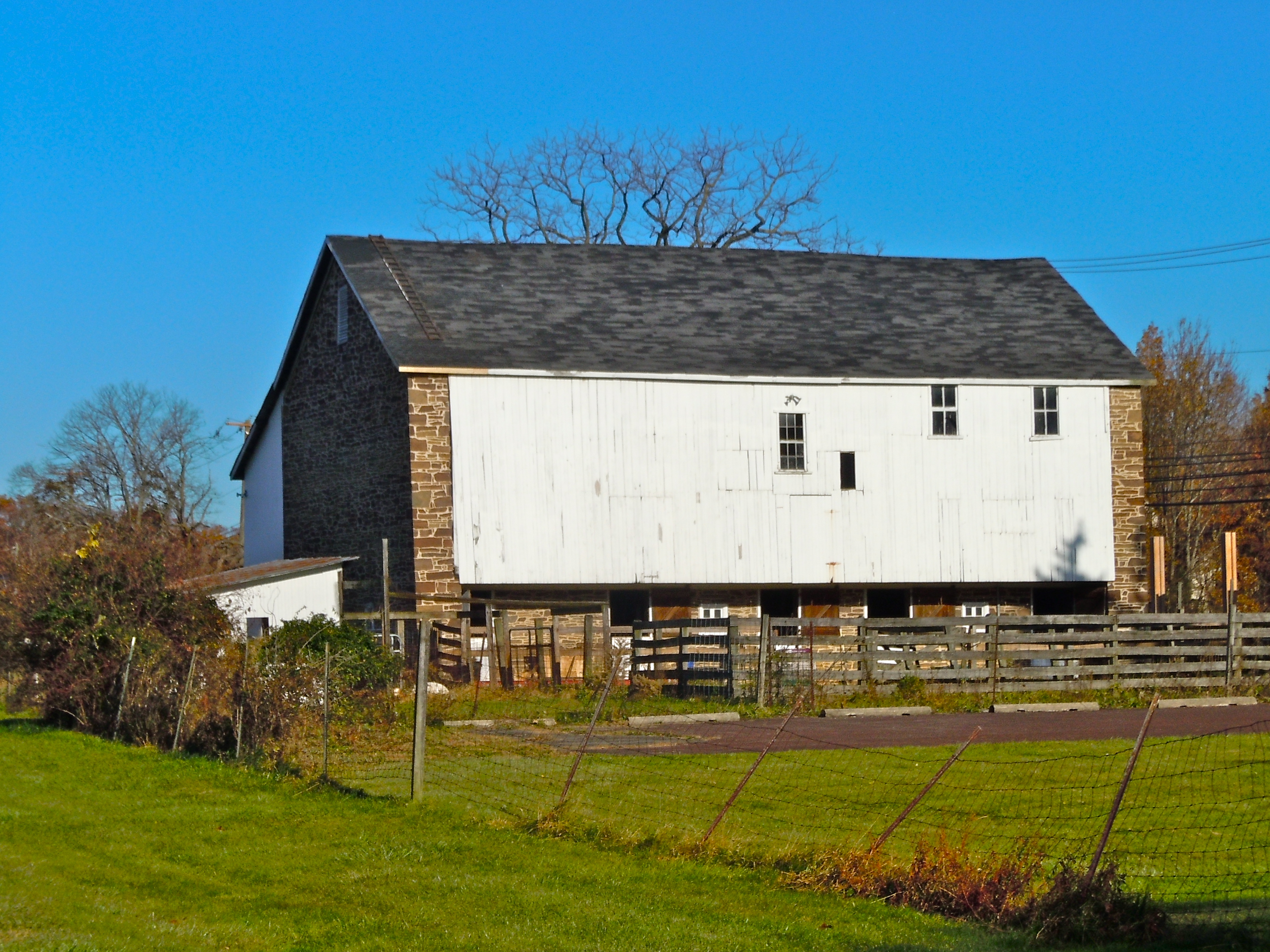
- Isaac Kulp Farm, November 2011

- Location within Pennsylvania Location within the United States
- Location: Jct. North Swedesford Rd. and Hancock Rd., Upper Gwynedd Township, Pennsylvania
- Coordinates: 40°12′54″N 75°15′12″W
- Area: 30 acres (12 ha)
- Architectural style: Georgian
- NRHP reference No.: 99000323
- Added to NRHP: March 12, 1999

The Isaac Kulp Farm is an historic home and farm which are located in Upper Gwynedd Township, Montgomery County, Pennsylvania, United States.

This farm was added to the National Register of Historic Places in 1999.

== History and architectural features ==
The property includes three contributing buildings. They are the farmhouse (1832), Pennsylvania bank barn and root cellar. The farmhouse is a three-story, five-bay by two-bay, stucco-covered stone dwelling that was designed in the Georgian style and has Italianate details. It has a one-story, stone addition.

The property is owned by Delaware Valley University and was operated as the Roth Living Farm Museum until 2012, when it became the Roth Center for Sustainable Agriculture.
