= Pittsburgh Steam Engine Company =

Manufacturing business in Pennsylvania, US

- Industry: Manufacturing
- Predecessor: Pittsburgh Engine Company
- Founded: 1811
- Founder: Oliver Evans
- Headquarters: Pittsburgh, Pennsylvania, United States
- Products: Anchors, high-pressure steam engines, iron casings, and other heavy equipment

The Pittsburgh Steam Engine Company, originally known as the Pittsburgh Engine Company, was a company founded in 1811 by Oliver Evans to manufacture high-pressure steam engines.

== History ==
This company opened for business shortly after Fulton's low-pressure New Orleans left Pittsburgh on her maiden voyage as the first steamboat west of the Appalachian Mountains. It was located at the corner of Front Street and Redoubt Alley in Downtown Pittsburgh, just blocks from the Monongahela wharf.

In addition to engines, the company made other heavy equipment and iron castings, including anchors on ships used by Commodore Perry in the War of 1812 on Lake Erie.

The company also manufactured rolling mills for the iron industry.
