= Lower Frederick Township, Pennsylvania =

Township in Pennsylvania, US

Lower Frederick Township
- Township
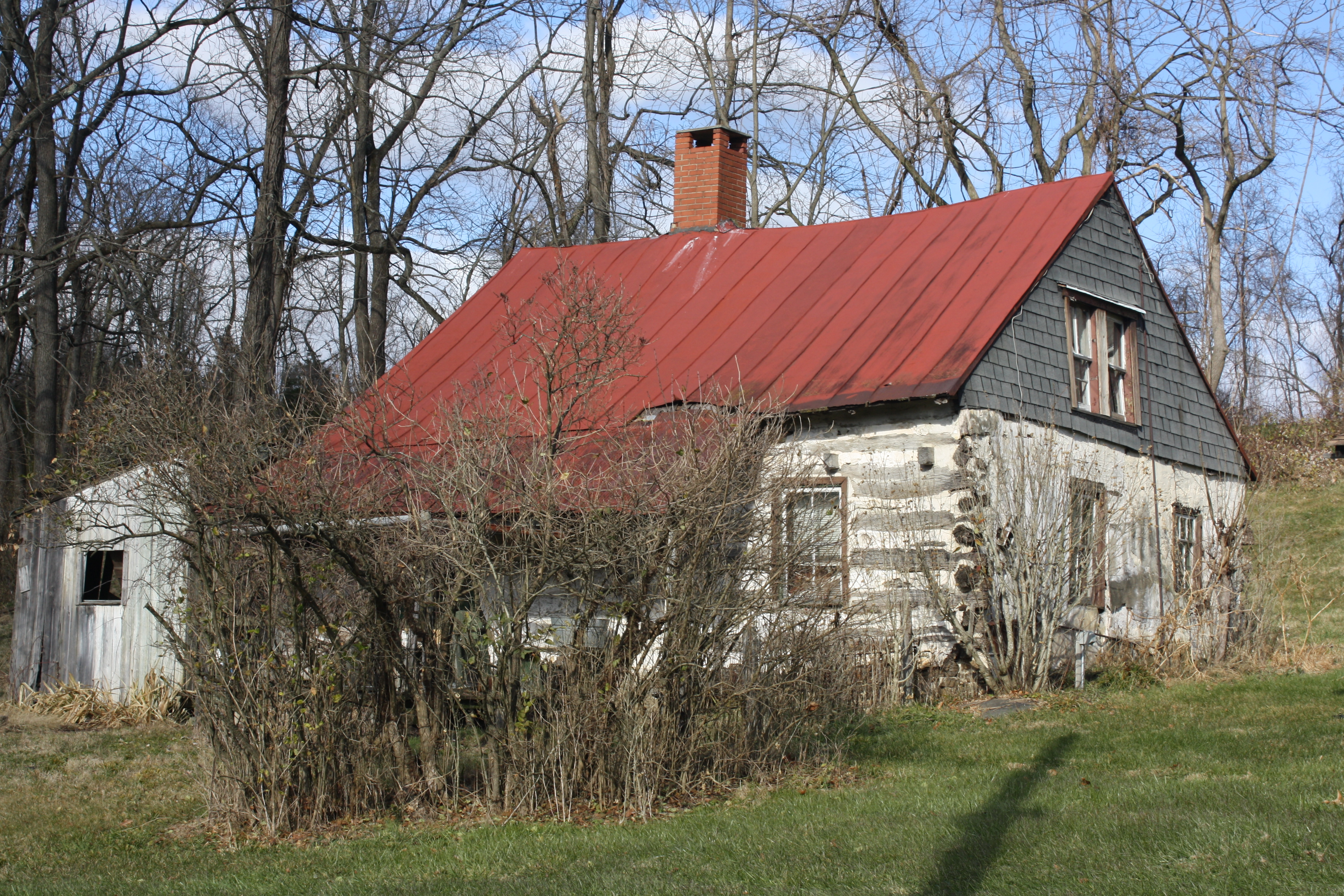
- Knurr Log House at Delphi

- Flag Seal

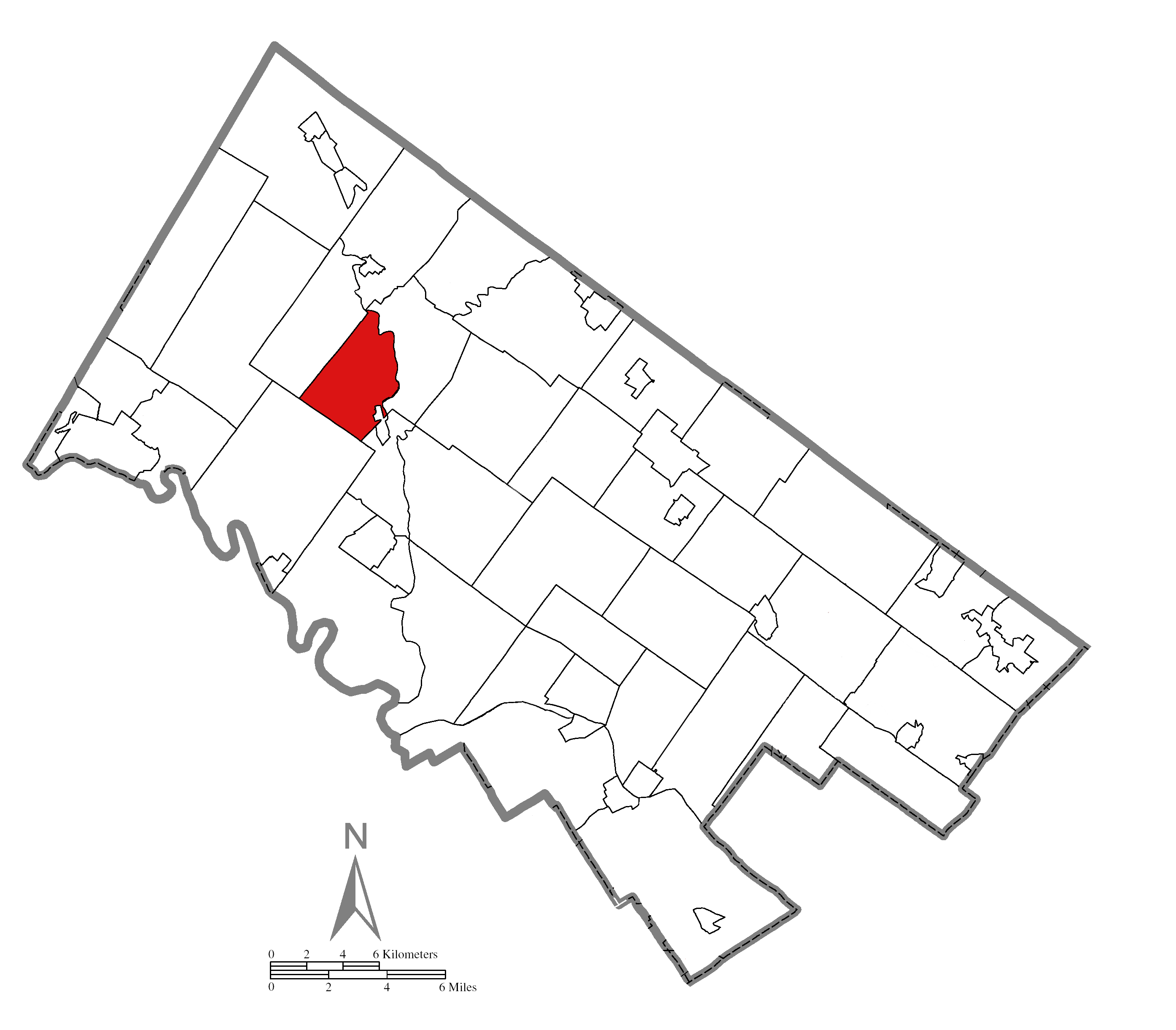
- Location of Lower Frederick Township in Montgomery County
- Coordinates: 40°17′03″N 75°28′39″W
- Country: United States
- State: Pennsylvania
- County: Montgomery

Area
  - Total: 8.13 sq mi (21.05 km^{2})
  - Land: 8.01 sq mi (20.74 km^{2})
  - Water: 0.12 sq mi (0.30 km^{2})
- Elevation: 239 ft (73 m)

Population (2010)
  - Total: 4,840
  - Estimate (2016): 4,893
  - Density: 610.9/sq mi (235.87/km^{2})
- Time zone: UTC-5 (EST)
  - Summer (DST): UTC-4 (EDT)
- Area code: 610
- FIPS code: 42-091-44912
- Website: www.lowerfrederick.org

Lower Frederick Township is a township in Montgomery County, Pennsylvania, United States. The population was 4,840 at the 2010 census.

== History ==
The Knurr Log House in the township was listed on the National Register of Historic Places in 1974.

== Geography ==
According to the United States Census Bureau, the township has a total area of 8.1 square miles (21.1 km^{2}), of which 8.0 square miles (20.7 km^{2}) is land and 0.1 square mile (0.3 km^{2}) (1.60%) is water. It is drained by the Perkiomen Creek into the Schuylkill River. Its villages include Delphi, Obelisk (also in Upper Frederick Township,) Spring Mount, and Zieglerville.

=== Neighboring municipalities ===
- Upper Salford Township (east)
- Schwenksville (south)
- Perkiomen Township (south)
- Limerick Township (southwest)
- Upper Frederick Township (northwest)

== Demographics ==
Historical population
Census	Pop.	Note	%±
1930	898		—
1940	1,099		22.4%
1950	1,620		47.4%
1960	2,108		30.1%
1970	2,515		19.3%
1980	2,379		−5.4%
1990	3,396		42.7%
2000	4,795		41.2%
2010	4,840		0.9%
2020	4,830		−0.2%

As of the 2010 census, the township was 94.3% White, 2.0% Black or African American, 0.3% Native American, 1.4% Asian, and 1.0% were two or more races. 3.0% of the population were of Hispanic or Latino ancestry.

As of the census of 2000, there were 4,795 people, 1,730 households, and 1,316 families residing in the township. The population density was 599.6 inhabitants per square mile (231.5/km^{2}). There were 1,806 housing units at an average density of 225.8 per square mile (87.2/km^{2}). The racial makeup of the township was 95.52% White, 1.86% African American, 0.23% Native American, 0.81% Asian, 0.48% from other races, and 1.11% from two or more races. Hispanic or Latino of any race were 1.48% of the population.

There were 1,730 households, out of which 41.2% had children under the age of 18 living with them, 65.8% were married couples living together, 7.5% had a female householder with no husband present, and 23.9% were non-families. 18.6% of all households were made up of individuals, and 3.8% had someone living alone who was 65 years of age or older. The average household size was 2.77 and the average family size was 3.19.

In the township the population was spread out, with 29.4% under the age of 18, 5.8% from 18 to 24, 37.7% from 25 to 44, 19.7% from 45 to 64, and 7.4% who were 65 years of age or older. The median age was 35 years. For every 100 females there were 96.5 males. For every 100 females age 18 and over, there were 96.1 males.

The median income for a household in the township was $60,125, and the median income for a family was $71,516. Males had a median income of $44,915 versus $34,135 for females. The per capita income for the township was $25,113. About 1.7% of families and 2.7% of the population were below the poverty line, including 3.1% of those under age 18 and 2.4% of those age 65 or over.

== Politics ==
Presidential elections results
Year	Republican	Democratic
2020	48.4% 1,477	49.6% 1,514
2016	49.9% 1,277	43.7% 1,119
2012	50.0% 1,192	48.4% 1,155
2008	45.9% 1,140	52.9% 1,313
2004	48.3% 1,282	50.7% 1,345
2000	54.7% 1,041	41.1% 783
1996	47.9% 753	36.6% 575
1992	40.0% 672	30.7% 515

== Transportation ==
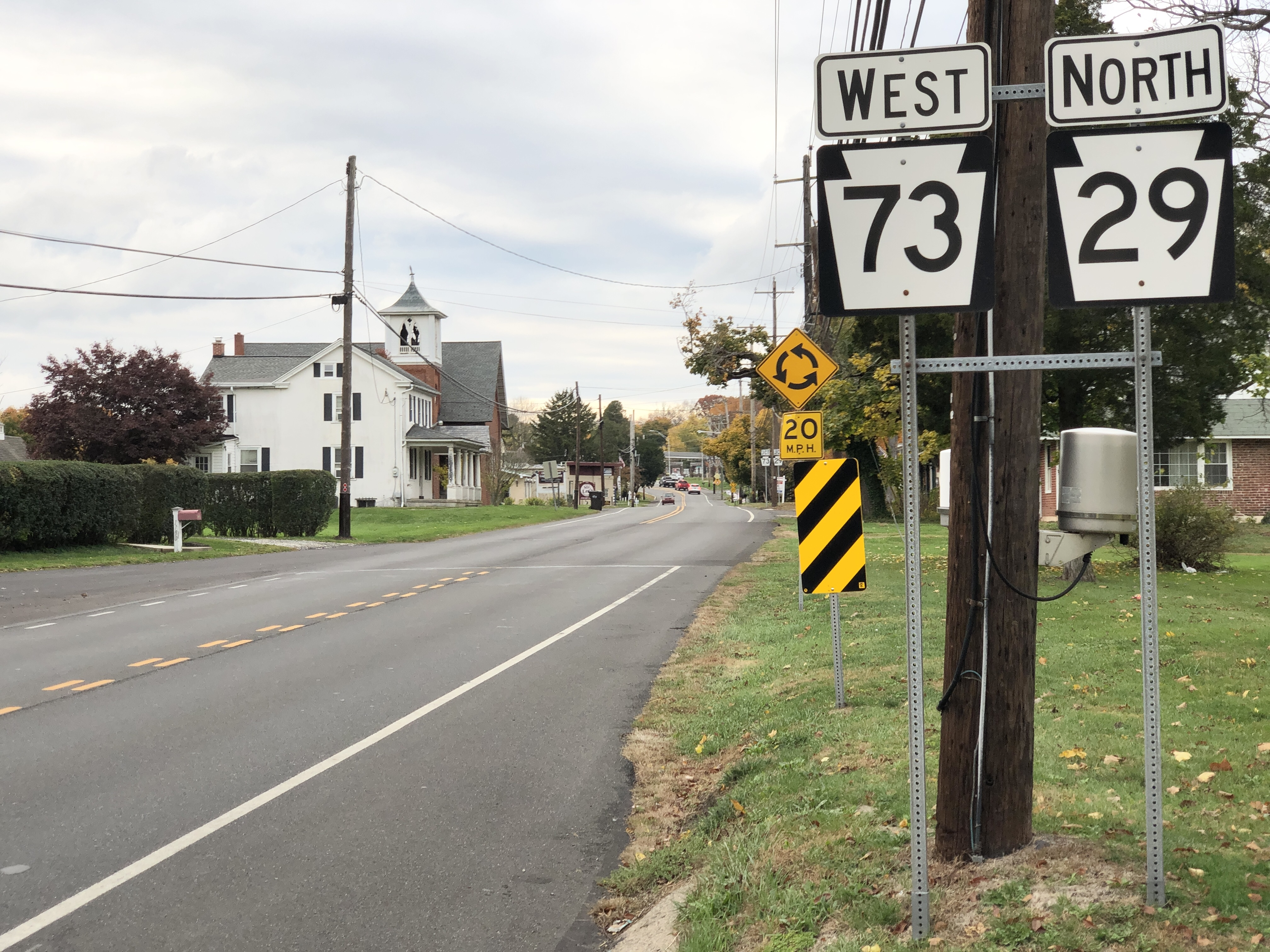
PA 29 northbound and PA 73 westbound in Lower Frederick Township

As of 2019 there were 39.04 miles (62.83 km) of public roads in Lower Frederick Township, of which 13.68 miles (22.02 km) were maintained by the Pennsylvania Department of Transportation (PennDOT) and 25.36 miles (40.81 km) were maintained by the township.

Pennsylvania Route 29 and Pennsylvania Route 73 are the primary highways traversing the township. They enter from the southeast concurrently along Gravel Pike, then diverge, with PA 29 following Gravel Pike northward and PA 73 following Big Road westward.

== Education ==
Lower Frederick Township is part of the Perkiomen Valley School District.

Residents are zoned to Schwenksville Elementary School, Middle School West, and Perkiomen Valley High School.
