= Spring Mount, Pennsylvania =

Unincorporated community in Pennsylvania, US

Spring Mount
- Census-designated place
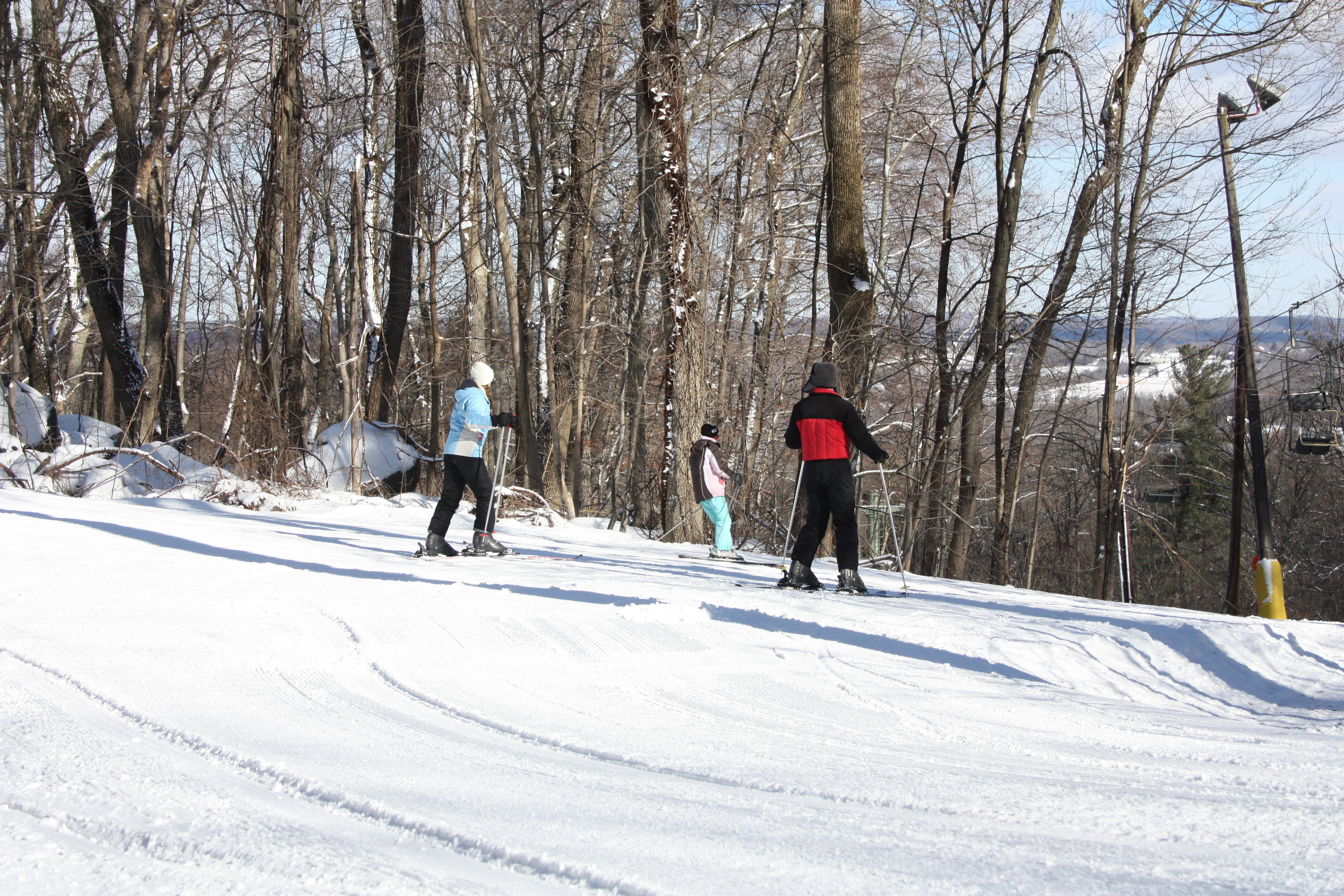

- Location of Spring Mount in Pennsylvania
- Coordinates: 40°16′28″N 75°27′56″W
- Country: United States
- State: Pennsylvania
- County: Montgomery
- Township: Lower Frederick

Area
  - Total: 1.7 sq mi (4.4 km^{2})
  - Land: 1.7 sq mi (4.4 km^{2})
  - Water: 0.0 sq mi (0 km^{2})
- Elevation: 154 ft (47 m)

Population (2010)
  - Total: 2,259
  - Density: 1,300/sq mi (510/km^{2})
- Time zone: UTC-5 (EST)
  - Summer (DST): UTC-4 (EDT)
- ZIP code: 19473
- Area codes: 610 and 484

Spring Mount is a census-designated place (CDP) in Lower Frederick Township, Montgomery County, Pennsylvania, United States. The population was 2,259 at the 2010 census.

== Geography ==
Spring Mount is located at 40°16′28″N 75°27′56″W (40.274441, -75.465423).

According to the United States Census Bureau, the CDP has a total area of 0.7 square miles (1.8 km^{2}), of which 0.6 square miles (1.6 km^{2}) is land and 1.52% is water.

== Demographics ==
Historical population
Census	Pop.	Note	%±
1990	1,365		—
2000	2,205		61.5%
2010	2,259		2.4%
2020	2,338		3.5%

As of the 2010 census, the CDP was 91.1% Non-Hispanic White, 3.1% Black or African American, 0.4% Native American and Alaskan Native, 1.2% Asian, 0.9% were Some Other Race, and 1.4% were two or more races. 3.2% of the population were of Hispanic or Latino ancestry.

At the 2000 census there were 2,205 people, 803 households, and 595 families living in the CDP. The population density was 3,395.2 inhabitants per square mile (1,310.9/km^{2}). There were 830 housing units at an average density of 1,278.0 per square mile (493.4/km^{2}). The racial makeup of the CDP was 93.24% White, 3.40% African American, 0.23% Native American, 1.13% Asian, 0.82% from other races, and 1.18% from two or more races. Hispanic or Latino of any race were 2.31%.

There were 803 households, 44.1% had children under the age of 18 living with them, 62.3% were married couples living together, 9.5% had a female householder with no husband present, and 25.9% were non-families. 20.4% of households were made up of individuals, and 2.7% were one person aged 65 or older. The average household size was 2.75 and the average family size was 3.21.

The age distribution was 30.8% under the age of 18, 5.8% from 18 to 24, 41.8% from 25 to 44, 16.1% from 45 to 64, and 5.5% 65 or older. The median age was 33 years. For every 100 females, there were 94.3 males. For every 100 females age 18 and over, there were 91.6 males.

The median household income was $60,350 and the median family income was $72,500. Males had a median income of $45,607 versus $35,259 for females. The per capita income for the CDP was $25,690. About 2.7% of families and 4.1% of the population were below the poverty line, including 4.6% of those under age 18 and 7.0% of those age 65 or over.

== Business ==
Spring Mount is dominated by the local Spring Mountain Ski Area. Owned by Ski Shops Buckman's Inc., the ski slope provides the closest access to skiing from the Philadelphia metropolitan area. The town contains one bar and one pizza shop.

== Education ==
The CDP is in the Perkiomen Valley School District.
