= Knurr Log House =

Historic house in Pennsylvania, United States

- U.S. National Register of Historic Places
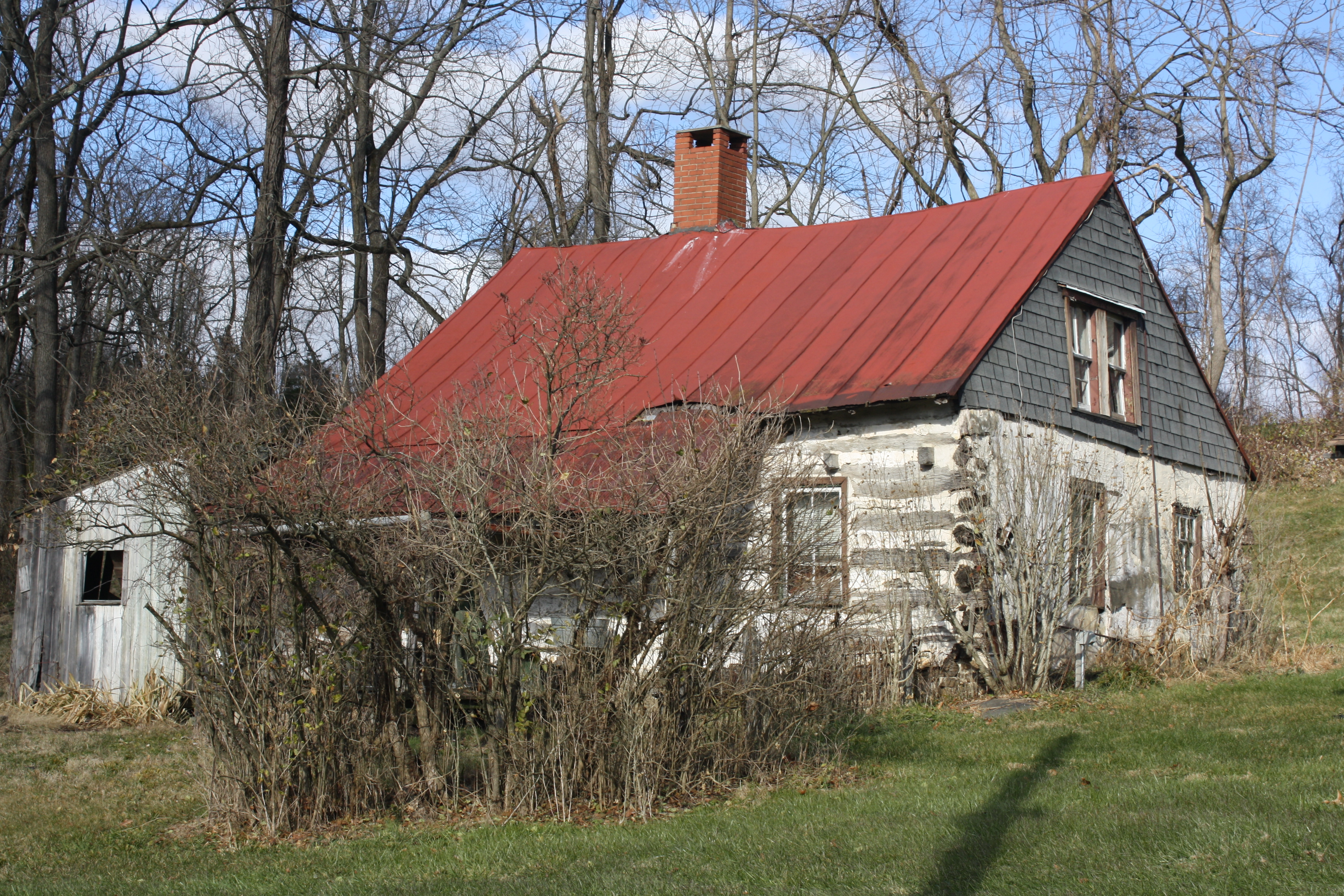
- Knurr Log House. November 2012.

- Location within Pennsylvania Location within the United States
- Location: Meng Rd., Delphi, Lower Frederick Township, Pennsylvania
- Coordinates: 40°16′06.2″N 75°28′40.7″W
- Area: 50 acres (20 ha)
- Built: c. 1750
- Architectural style: Germanic log house
- NRHP reference No.: 74001795
- Added to NRHP: November 5, 1974

The Knurr Log House is an historic home that is located in Delphi in Lower Frederick Township, Montgomery County, Pennsylvania, United States.

It was added to the National Register of Historic Places in 1973.

== History and architectural features ==
Built circa 1750, this historic structure is a 1 1/2-story, Germanic log dwelling. It has a gable roof and traditional three-room, first-floor plan. Also located on the property are a nineteenth-century bank barn, two chicken houses, a corn crib, and a tool and wood shed.

== Gallery ==
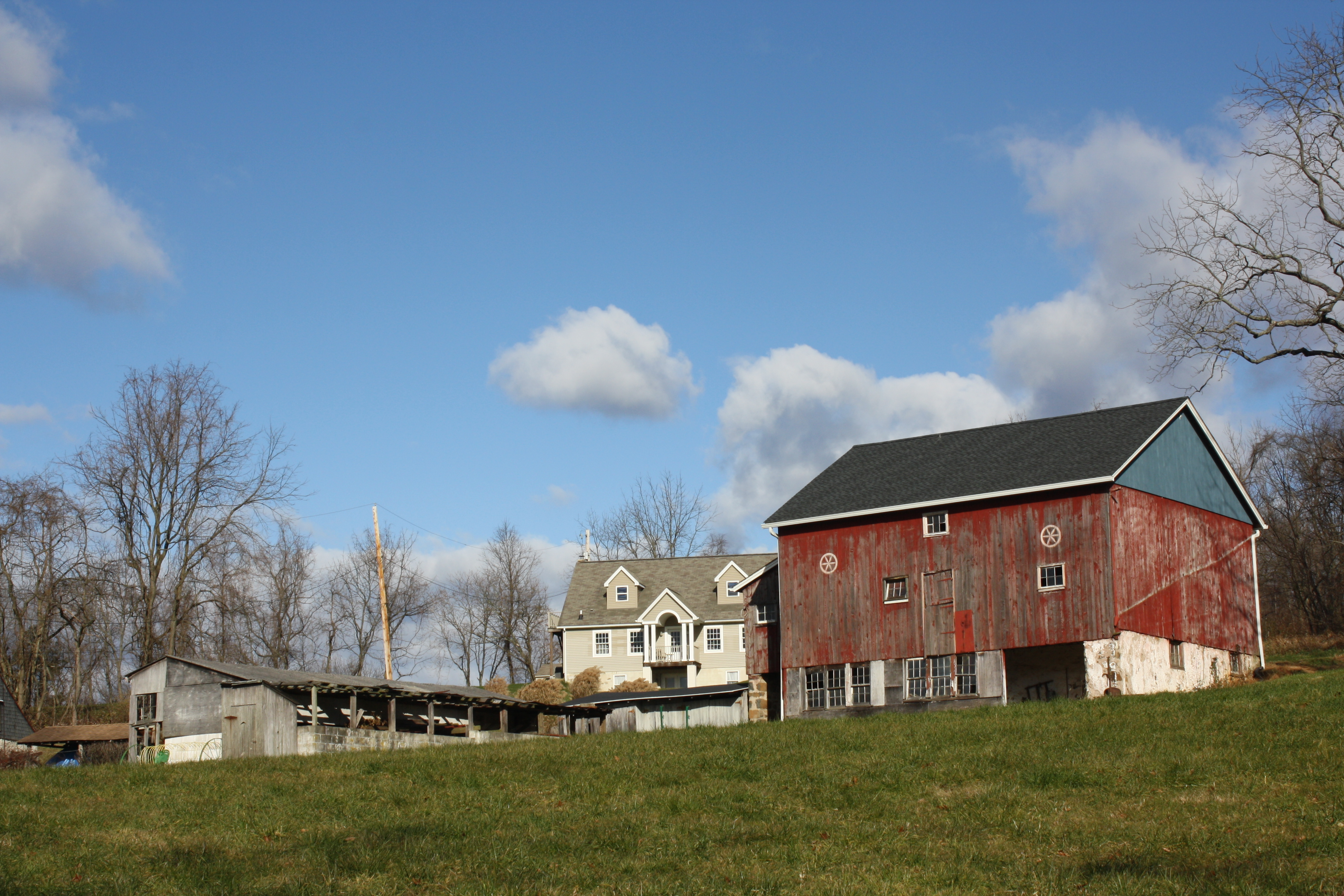
Sheds and barn

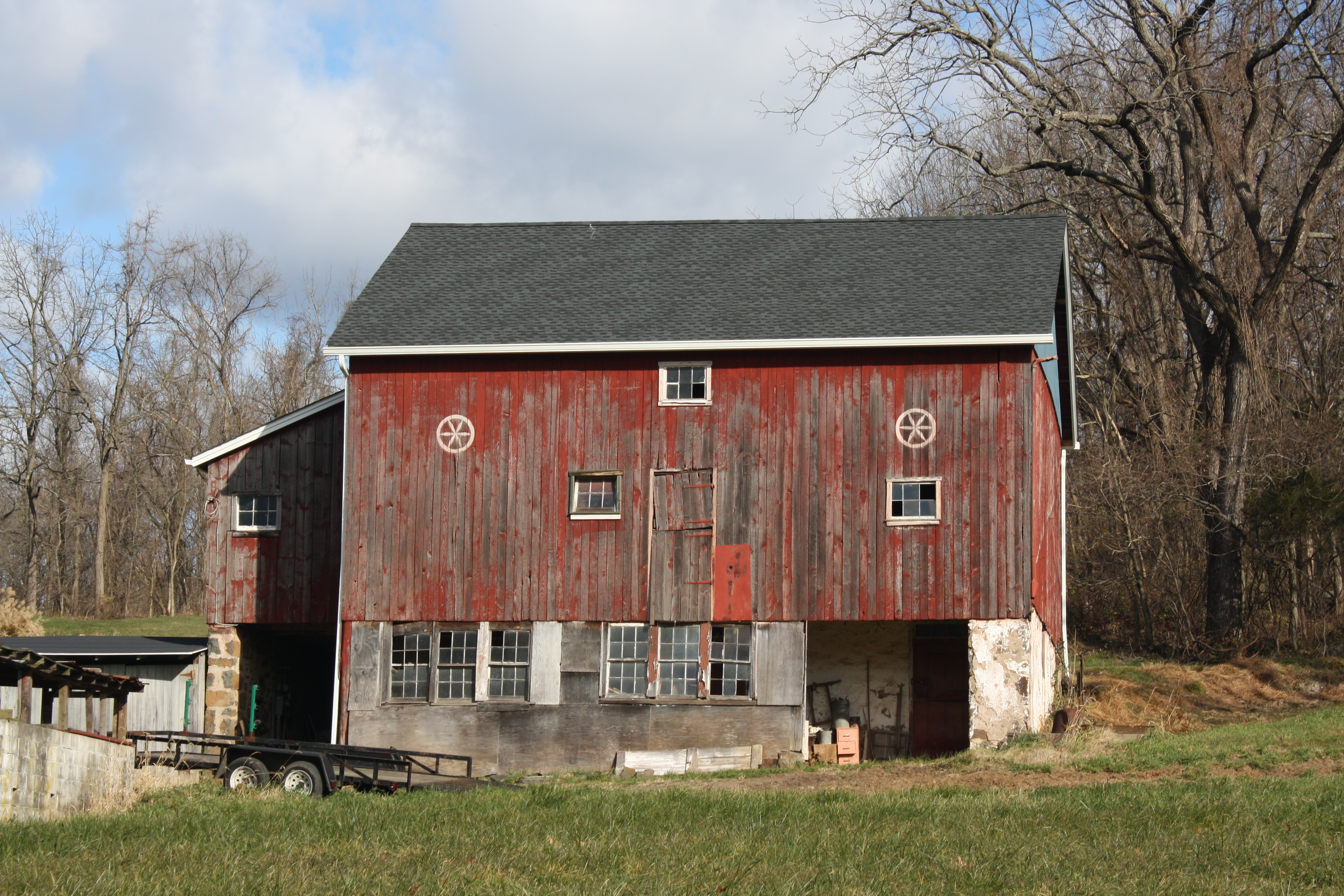
Bank Barn

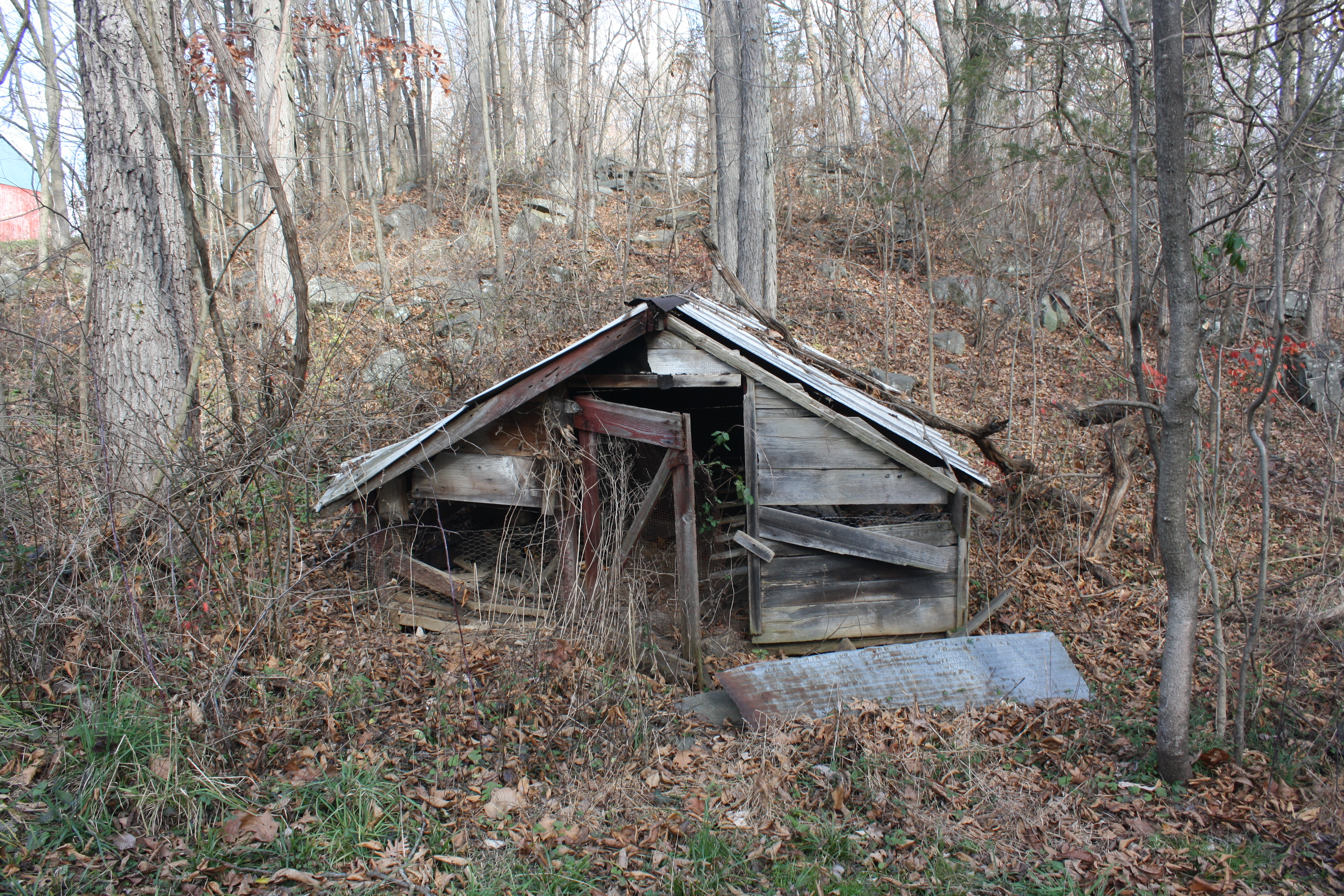
Shed in the wood
