= Perkiomen Township, Pennsylvania =

Township in Pennsylvania, US

Perkiomen Township
- Township
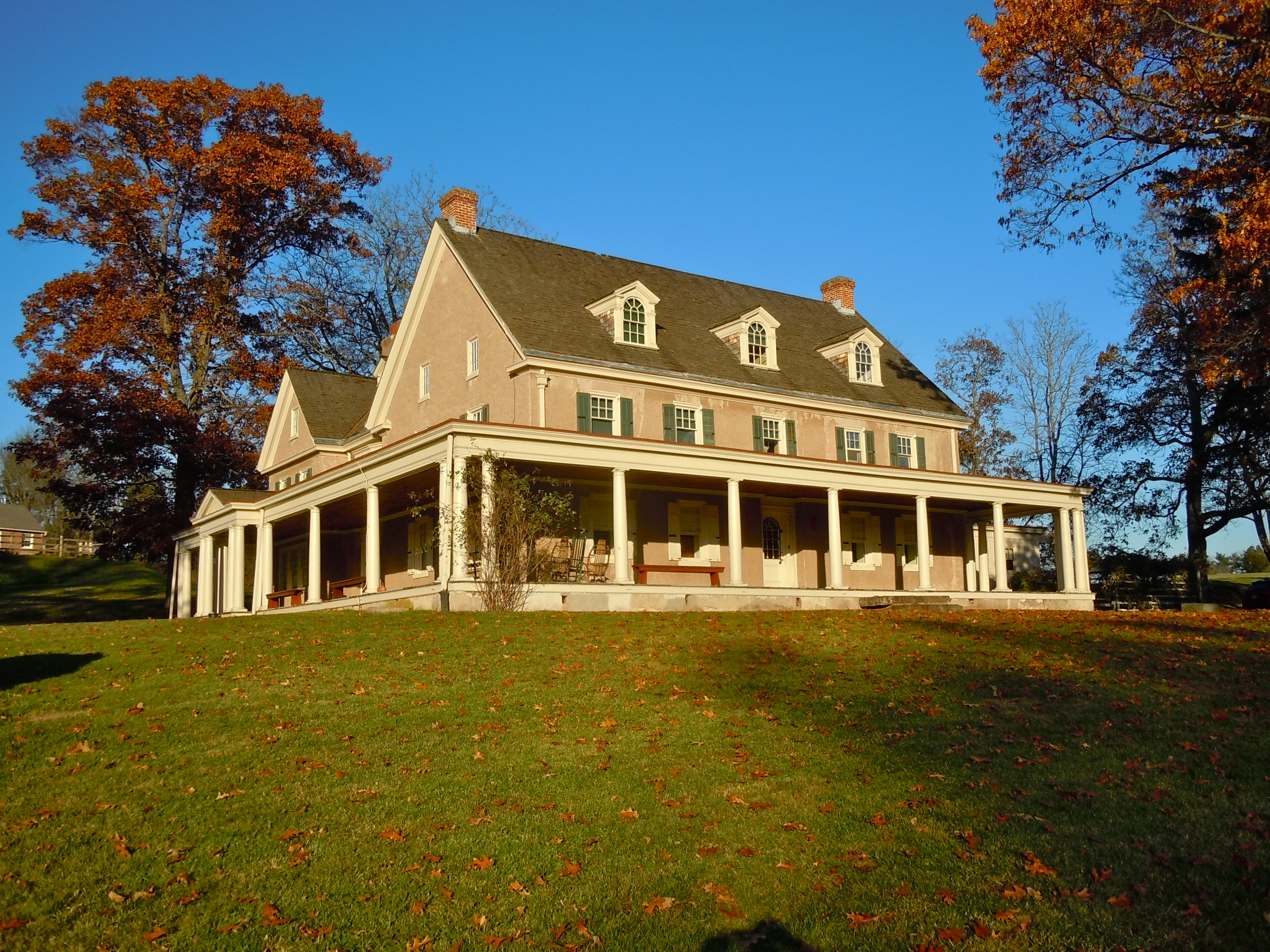
- Pennypacker Mills, built 1720

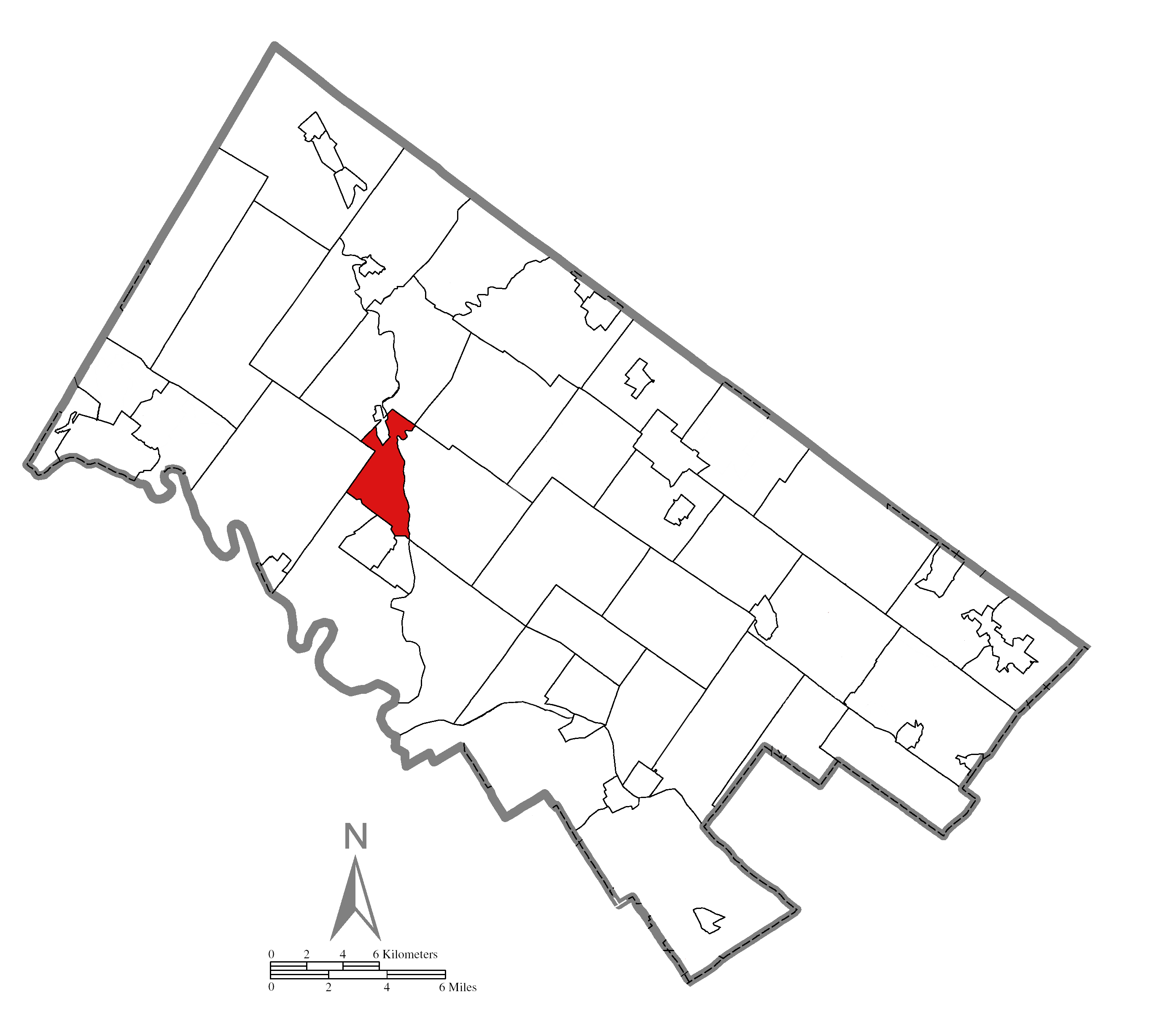
- Location of Perkiomen Township in Montgomery County, Pennsylvania
- Coordinates: 40°15′06″N 75°27′29″W
- Country: United States
- State: Pennsylvania
- County: Montgomery

Area
  - Total: 4.93 sq mi (12.78 km^{2})
  - Land: 4.85 sq mi (12.57 km^{2})
  - Water: 0.077 sq mi (0.20 km^{2})
- Elevation: 148 ft (45 m)

Population (2010)
  - Total: 9,139
  - Estimate (2016): 9,245
  - Density: 1,904/sq mi (735.2/km^{2})
- Time zone: UTC-5 (EST)
  - Summer (DST): UTC-4 (EDT)
- Area code: 610
- FIPS code: 42-091-59392
- Website: https://www.perkiomentownship.org

Perkiomen Township is a township in Montgomery County, Pennsylvania, United States. As of the 2010 census, the township population was 9,139, which represents a 28.8% increase from the 2000 total of 7,093 residents. Governmentally, it is a township of the second class, governed by a board of supervisors. It is part of the Perkiomen Valley School District. Perkiomen Township includes an abundance of history that goes as far back as to the first tribes who inhabited the area. This township started with the inhabitants of the Lenni-Lenape Tribe and progressed in many ways into what it is today.

== History ==
The Perkiomen Valley was first inhabited by the Lenni-Lenape Tribe and was declared part of the Commonwealth of Pennsylvania on March 4, 1681, by King Charles II.

In 1720, the first copper mine in Pennsylvania was located near Schwenksville. Perkiomen Valley provided the colonists and the Native Americans a rich place to grow crops and livestock, which would later feed the troops during the Revolutionary War. George Washington's troops were stationed in Valley Forge during the American Revolutionary War. One of the notable residents of the Perkiomen Valley was John James Audubon, a French-American ornithologist noted for his paintings and drawings of birds.

In 1784, Montgomery County was formed with land that was previously owned by the city of Philadelphia. Nearly a century later in 1879 Limerick Township was created and in 1886 the Skippack and Perkiomen Townships split into Skippack Township and Perkiomen Township. Perkiomen Township later split into Lower Perkiomen Township and Upper Perkiomen Township. Collegeville and Trappe are two towns in Montgomery County that were purchased by Ursinus College in 1869 and were later included in Upper Providence Township in 1896. In 1903, Schwenksville was incorporated into the Perkiomen Township.

At the 1990 census, nearly 59,000 people lived in the Perkiomen Valley. Limerick Township contains the Nuclear Power Plant that produces electricity for the Perkiomen Valley and is owned by PECO. Many businesses that consider expanding to the suburbs of Philadelphia look towards the Perkiomen Valley since it is one of the major areas that are rapidly developing into a powerhouse of the suburbs of Philadelphia. They are also moving to the Perkiomen Valley because the businesses are able to escape many problems that having a business in Philadelphia creates and they are able to attract more skilled workers to their companies allowing them to grow.

=== Early living styles ===
The Perkiomen Valley was once referred to as the “Goschenhoppen”, named after the Native American people who referred to themselves as Lenape. The vast majority of settlers were German. They were of Lutheran and German reformed faith. Their language was used exclusively and eventually evolved today into what is now known as Pennsylvania Dutch. Many old roads ran through Perkiomen valley and were maintained as well as roads are today. The people that lived on the roads did all of the upkeep. Farming was one of the settler's main ways of living until they discovered they could use their streams for operating mills. These mills were used for many different things such as gunpowder, mixing animal food, as well as cutting wood and graining flour. These mills provided the settlers with an easy way of production as well as a good source of income. The railroad was also a major transportation use. It went through many main places but ran along the Schuylkill River. Because of this major railroad, the cigar industry rose to success. This industry brought in an influx of workers, which resulted in a greater population. With more people came a more diverse civilization, as well as the construction of homes, stores, places of worship, and many more. This industry was appealing to both the artisan as well as the tradesmen, who took on the cigar business over farming.

== Perkiomen Watershed Conservacy (PWC) ==
The Perkiomen Watershed Conservancy at 362-square miles is a part of the Schuylkill River watershed. A watershed is a drainage basin that collects surface water from other running bodies of water. The Perkiomen Watershed plays a part in the Perkiomen Valley by creating a water system for this area. Originally called the Perkiomen Valley Watershed Association, it was started in 1964 to help address these poor water conditions in the Perkiomen Creek. When PWC first started it was divided between public education activities, continuing data collection, efforts to advance the idea of state water quality standards and a required degree of treatment for wastes discharged to streams. A half of century later in the first meetings, the PWC has helped clean trash from creeks, this has helped in the preserve the Spring Mountain area, this has helped educate children and adults. This program taught people about our connection to nature, how to preserve and repair riparian areas along local creeks to help reduce erosion and improve water quality.

== Demographics ==
Historical population
Census	Pop.	Note	%±
2000	7,093		—
2010	9,139		28.8%
2020	8,959		−2.0%
U.S. Decennial Census

As of the 2010 census, the township was 88.1% White, 4.1% Black or African American, 5.2% Asian, and 2.1% were two or more races. 2.9% of the population were of Hispanic or Latino ancestry [1].

As of the census of 2000, there were 7,093 people, 2,468 households, and 1,966 families residing in the township. The population density was 1,467.5 inhabitants per square mile (566.6/km^{2}). There were 2,556 housing units at an average density of 528.8/sq mi (204.3/km^{2}). The racial makeup of the township was 92.99% White, 3.14% African American, 0.11% Native American, 1.90% Asian, 0.07% Pacific Islander, 0.62% from other races, and 1.16% from two or more races. Hispanic or Latino of any race were 1.52% of the population.

There were 2,468 households, out of which 48.1% had children under the age of 18 living with them, 69.4% were married couples living together, 7.8% had a female householder with no husband present, and 20.3% were non-families. 16.2% of all households were made up of individuals, and 3.1% had someone living alone who was 65 years of age or older. The average household size was 2.87 and the average family size was 3.25.

In the township the population was spread out, with 31.7% under the age of 18, 4.4% from 18 to 24, 41.9% from 25 to 44, 16.7% from 45 to 64, and 5.3% who were 65 years of age or older. The median age was 33 years. For every 100 females there were 98.4 males. For every 100 females age 18 and over, there were 93.3 males.

The median income for a household in the township was $74,878, and the median income for a family was $82,046. Males had a median income of $52,358 versus $37,379 for females. The per capita income for the township was $27,800. About 3.0% of families and 3.6% of the population were below the poverty line, including 3.8% of those under age 18 and 2.1% of those age 65 or over.

== Government and politics ==
Pennsylvania's current Governor is Josh Shapiro and the Secretary of the Commonwealth is Pedro Cortes. These two men represent all of Pennsylvania as well as Montgomery County. Montgomery County is governed by a three-person County Commission. The current composition is two Democrats and one Republican. By law, the County Commission must have one member of a minority party represented. The Commissioner of Montgomery County is Joseph C. Gale, Republican, and the Vice Chair is Valerie A. Arkoosh, MD, MPH, Democrat, and the Chair is Josh Shapiro, Democrat. These three men and women are in charge of administering the county's government and are in charge of various departments. Some of the departments include County Administration, Judicial, Corrections, Health and General Welfare, Adult and Senior Services, Child Welfare, Law Enforcement and Public Safety and Veterans Affairs.

== Economy ==
Montgomery County has many companies that employ thousands of men and women. The company that employs the most men and women in Montgomery county is Merck which employs approximately 9,700 men and women. Some of the other companies that employ many people include SEI Investment with 1,983 people, State Correctional Institution at Graterford with 1,300 employees, and Limerick Generating Station - Exelon Nuclear with 800 employees and Matheson Tri-Gas. These are some of the major companies in the area but there are also small businesses that employ many of the men and women throughout Montgomery County. Some of the smaller but still significant employers include but are not limited to Springford Area School District with 1,020 employees, Perkiomen Valley School District with 761 employees, Pottstown School District with 550 employees, Owen J. Roberts School District with 642 employees, and Daniel Boone Area School District with 531 employees. A new shopping complex called Providence Town Center was built in 2009 and had many stores and restaurants built.

== Transportation ==
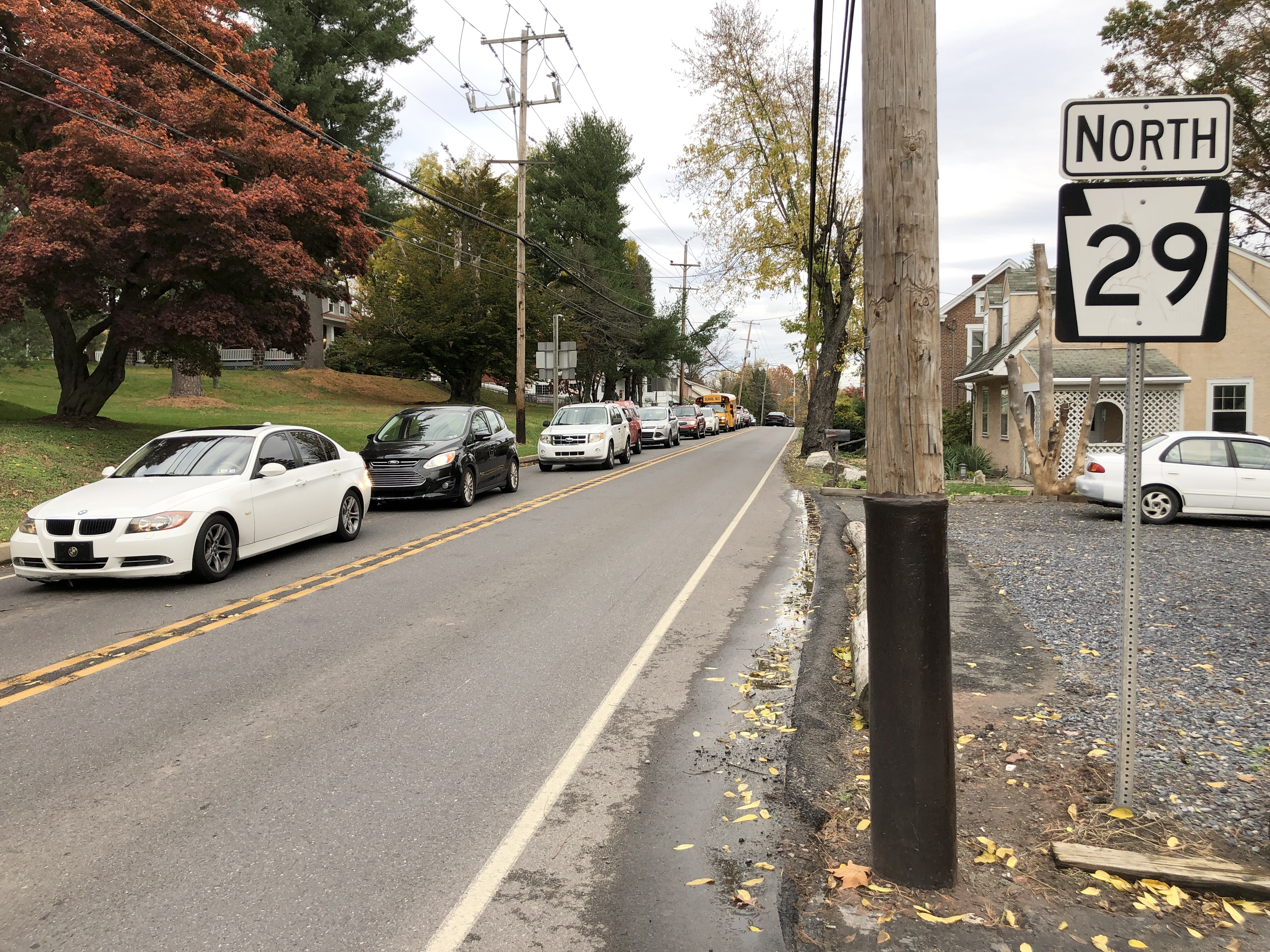
PA 29 northbound in Perkiomen Township

As of 2020 there were 36.11 miles (58.11 km) of public roads in Perkiomen Township, of which 8.05 miles (12.96 km) were maintained by the Pennsylvania Department of Transportation (PennDOT) and 28.06 miles (45.16 km) were maintained by the township.

Pennsylvania Route 29, Pennsylvania Route 73 and Pennsylvania Route 113 are the primary highways serving Perkiomen Township. PA 29 follows the Gravel Pike along a north-south alignment through the township. PA 73 follows Skippack Pike on a brief east-west alignment near the north edge of the township. Finally, PA 113 follows Bridge Road along an east-west alignment near the south end of the township.

== Education ==
=== Colleges and universities ===
Montgomery County Community College is a local community college that was founded in 1964 and is located in Blue Bell. Their west campus is located in Pottstown and its culinary arts institution is located in Lansdale.

Ursinus College is a private institution that was founded in 1869 and is located in Collegeville.

=== Primary and secondary schools ===
Perkiomen Township is a part of the Perkiomen Valley School District.

Residents are zoned to four different elementary schools: Evergreen, Schwenksville, Skippack and South. Middle School West and Middle School East serve sections of the township. All residents are zoned to Perkiomen Valley High School.
