= Pennypacker Mills =

- Pennypacker Mansion
- U.S. National Register of Historic Places
- Pennsylvania Historical Marker
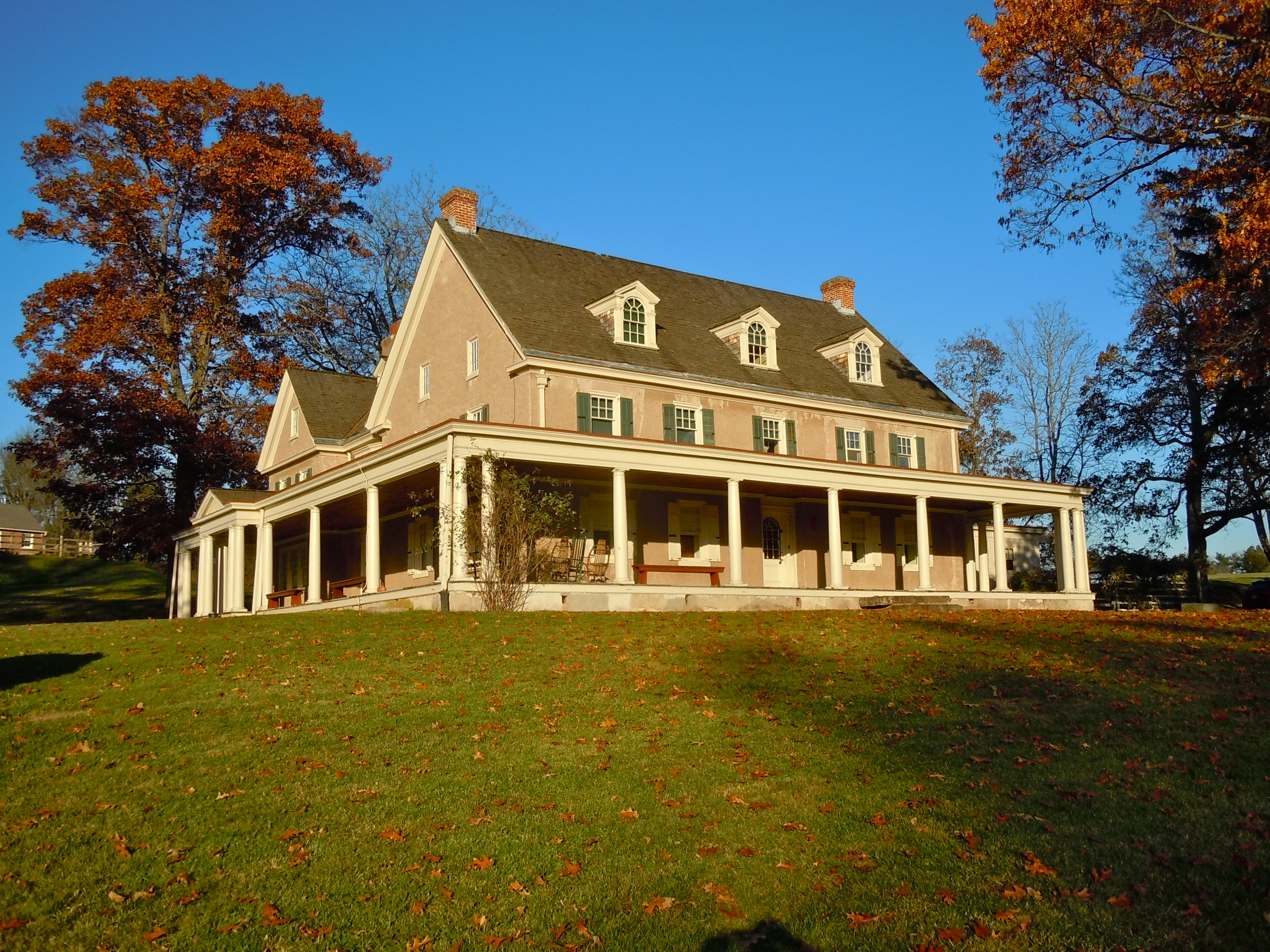
- Southern elevation

- Location within Pennsylvania Location within the United States
- Nearest city: Schwenksville, Pennsylvania
- Coordinates: 40°15′15″N 75°27′28″W
- Area: 5.5 acres (2.2 ha)
- Built: 1720
- NRHP reference No.: 76001657

Significant dates
- Added to NRHP: November 07, 1976
- Designated PHMC: September 24, 1946

Pennypacker Mills is an American colonial mansion that is surrounded by 170 acres (0.69 km^{2}) of farmland in Perkiomen Township, near Schwenksville, Pennsylvania. Located on the shore of the Perkiomen Creek, it is situated approximately 35 miles (56 km) northwest of Philadelphia.

The house was added to the National Register of Historic Places in 1976.

== History and architectural features ==
Originally built circa 1720 by Hans Jost Hite, this mansion was purchased in 1747 by Peter Pennebacker, and remained privately owned by Pennypackers for eight generations.

During the American Revolutionary War, George Washington used Pennypacker Mills in the fall of 1777 as a headquarters prior to the Battle of Germantown, and also as a field hospital for injured soldiers after the battle.

Pennsylvania governor Samuel Pennypacker made the Mills his summer home during the early 1900s, and lived there for much of his term in office (1903–1907). After his term, he lived at the Mills year-round until his death in 1916. He was an avid collector of antiques and manuscripts, and many of these can still be found on display at the Mills, along with letters and orders written by George Washington.

The house was added to the National Register of Historic Places in 1976.

Pennypacker Mills hosts special events such as Civil War reenactments on a regular basis, and is open to the public for tours Tuesday through Saturday from 10:00 a.m. to 4:00 p.m. and Sunday from 1:00 to 4:00 p.m. with the last daily tour at 3:00 p.m. Admission is free.

== Gallery ==
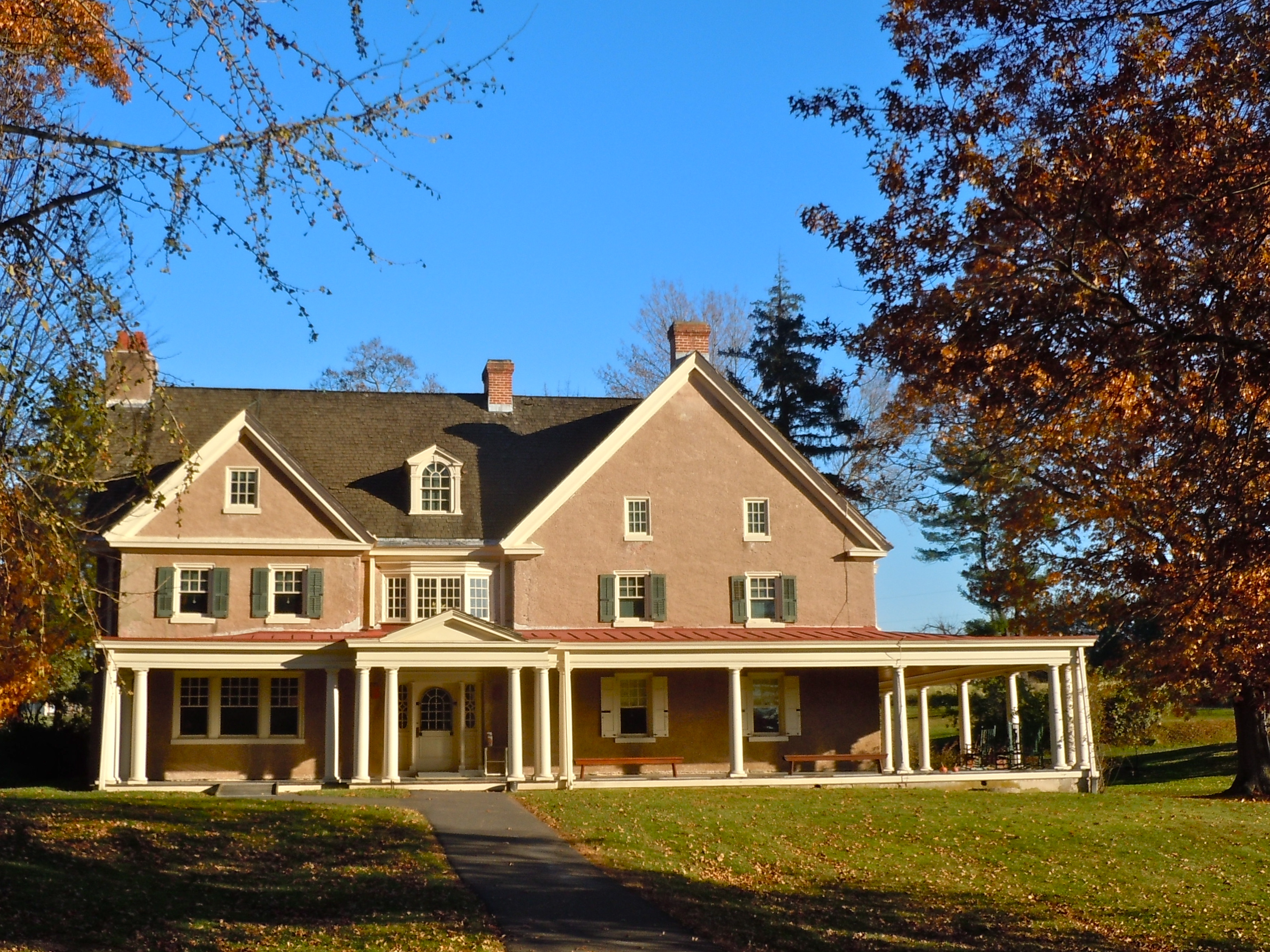
Western elevation

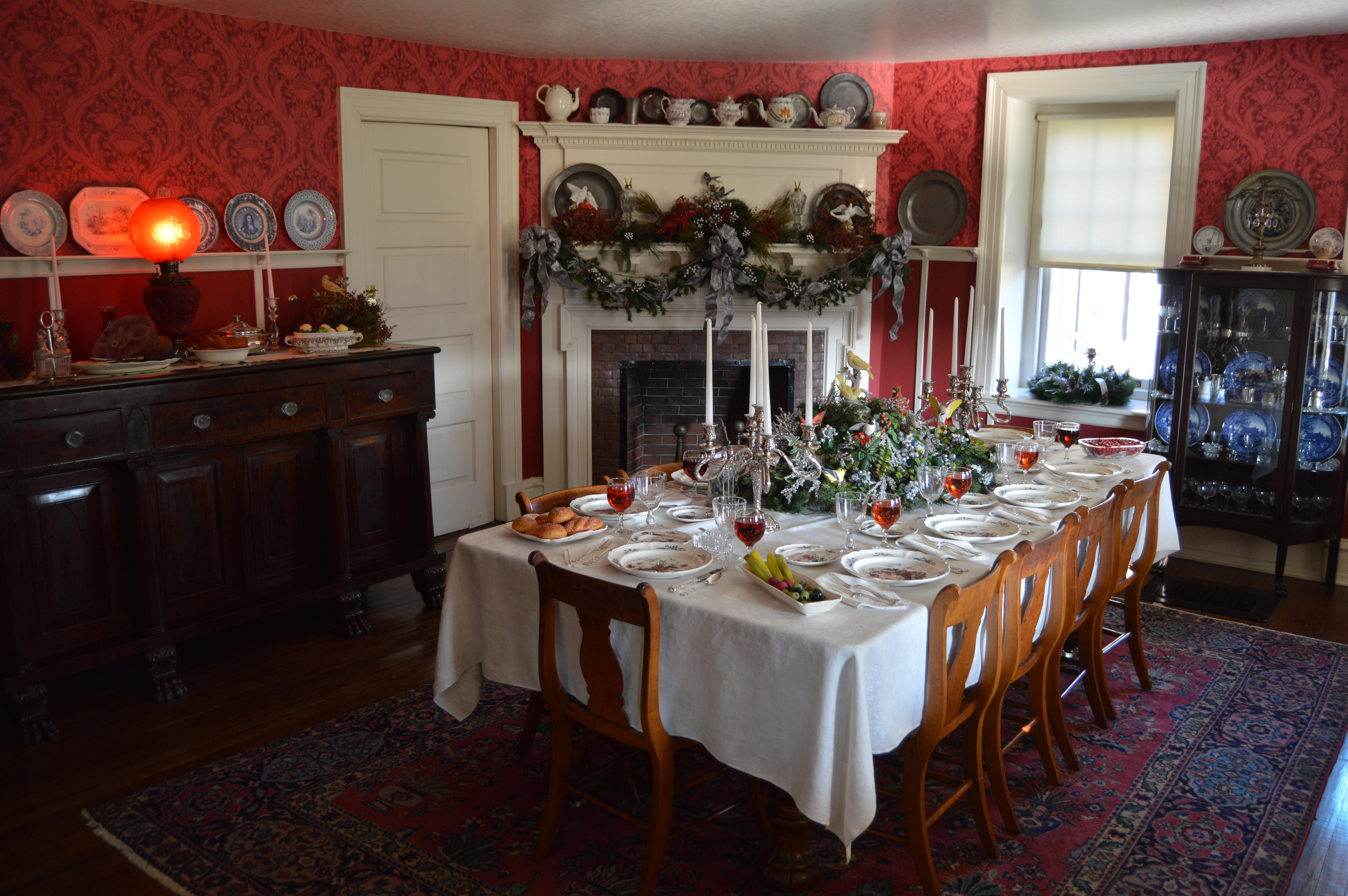
The home's dining room, decorated for the holiday season

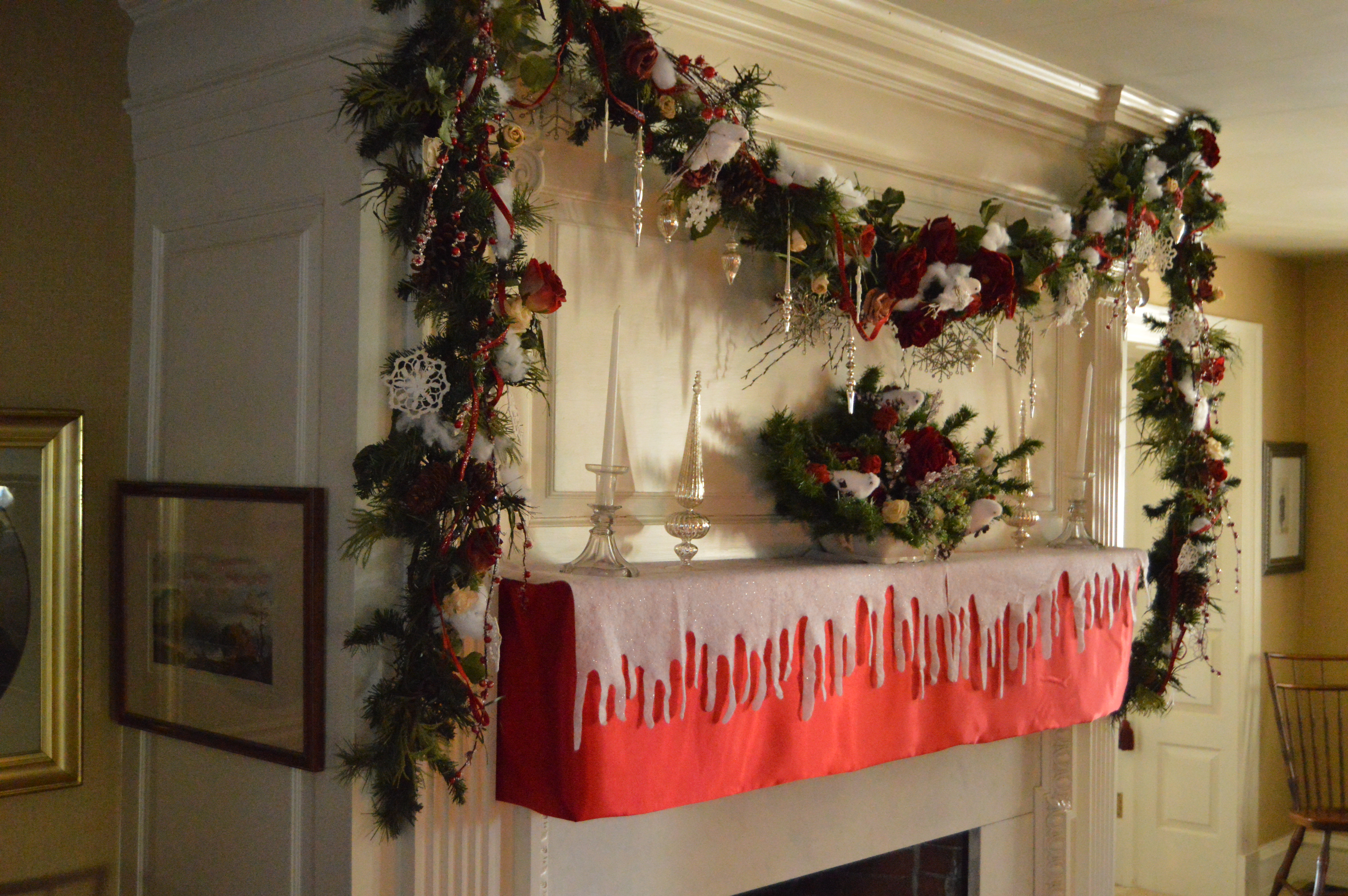
Mantle decorated for Christmas

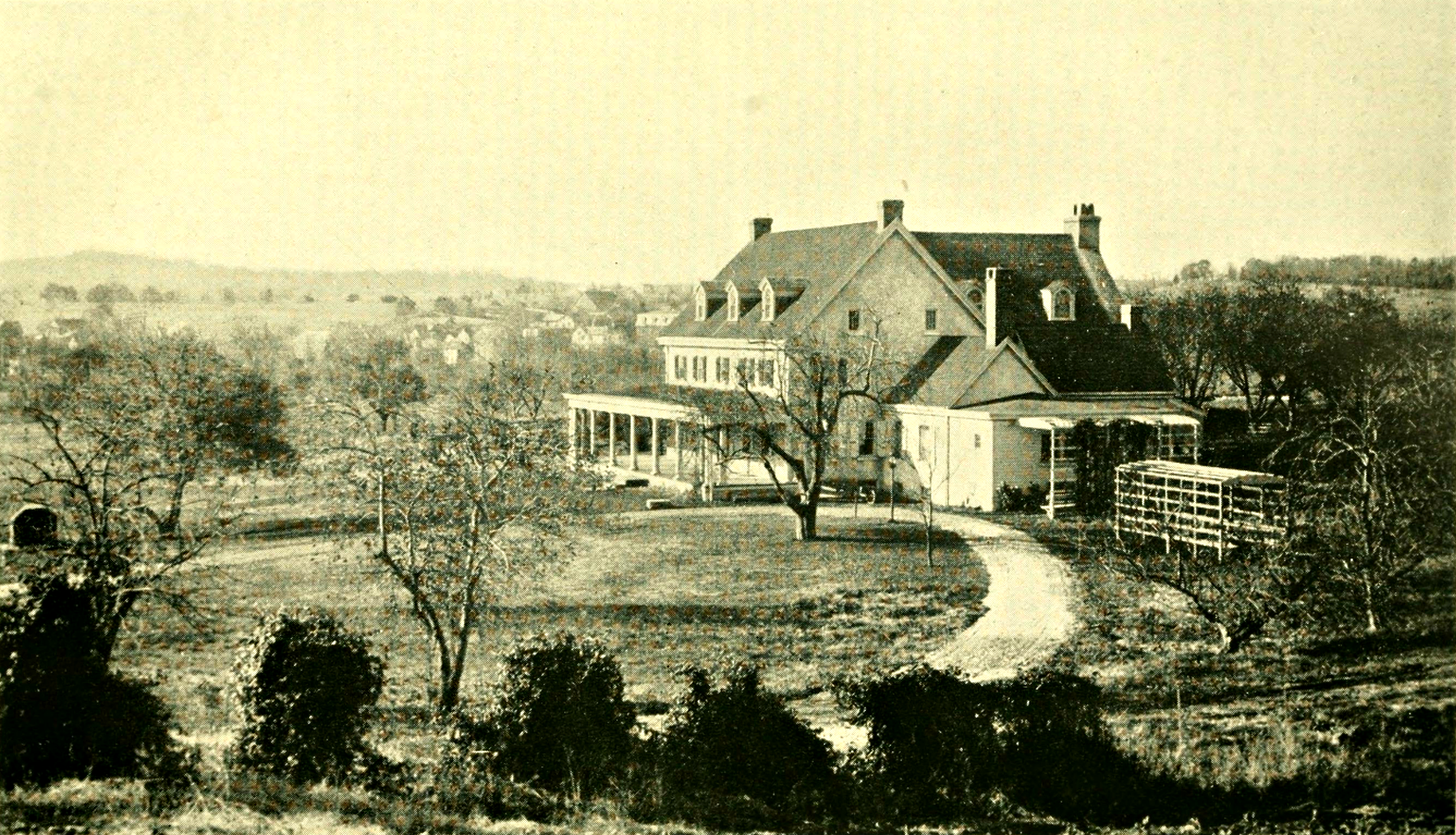
view in 1918
