= Perkiomen Valley School District =

School district in Pennsylvania

Address
- 3 Iron Bridge Drive Collegeville, Pennsylvania, 19426; United States

District information
- Motto: What will you learn today?
- Grades: K – 12
- Established: 1969; 57 years ago
- Superintendent: Dr. Barbara A. Russell
- Budget: $112.5 Million (2021-2022 school year)

Students and staff
- Students: 4,993 (2021-2 school year)
- Athletic conference: Pioneer Athletic Conference
- District mascot: Viking
- Colors: Orange and brown

Other information
- Website: www.pvsd.org

The Perkiomen Valley School District (PVSD) is a school district based in central Montgomery County, Pennsylvania, United States. It serves the boroughs of Collegeville, Trappe, and Schwenksville, and the townships of Lower Frederick, Perkiomen, and Skippack, in Pennsylvania. The district headquarters are in Perkiomen Township.

The district's mascot is the Viking.

== History ==
The Perkiomen Valley School District was formed in 1969 through the merger of the Perkiomen Joint School District and the Schwenksville Union School District. Perkiomen Joint School District was, itself, a consolidation of Collegeville, Trappe, and Skippack Township (served by the former Collegeville-Trappe High School), while Schwenksville Union School District had unified Schwenksville, Lower Frederick Township, and Perkiomen Township (served by the former Schwenksville High School).

Its mascot and distinctive colors of orange and brown were elected by the students in the spring of 1969, after the merger was announced. (Collegeville-Trappe had the Colonel and colors of red and gold, and Schwenksville, the Bluebird, with blue and white.) Some alumni believe that the new mascot and colors were chosen by the administration – for some unexplained reason – without regard to the election results.

Perkiomen Valley High School, then housed in what had been the Collegeville-Trappe High School building, and the former Perkiomen Valley Junior High School, housed at the old Schwenksville High School, opened that fall. The current high school building, at 509 Gravel Pike (Pennsylvania Route 29), Graterford, Perkiomen Township (Collegeville postal address), opened in the fall of 1976.

The original superintendent was the late Dr. U. Berkley Ellis, Jr.

U.S. News & World Report, in its 2018 list of best high schools in the United States, ranked Perkiomen Valley High School the ninth best high school in Pennsylvania.

== Schools ==
- Evergreen Elementary School
- Skippack Elementary School
- South Elementary School
- Schwenksville Elementary School
- Perkiomen Valley Middle School East
- Perkiomen Valley Middle School West
- Perkiomen Valley High School

== Notable alumni ==
- Grant Wiley, American football player
- Jen Carfagno, Meteorologist, The Weather Channel
