= Schwenksville, Pennsylvania =

Borough in Pennsylvania, US

Borough of Schwenksville
- Borough
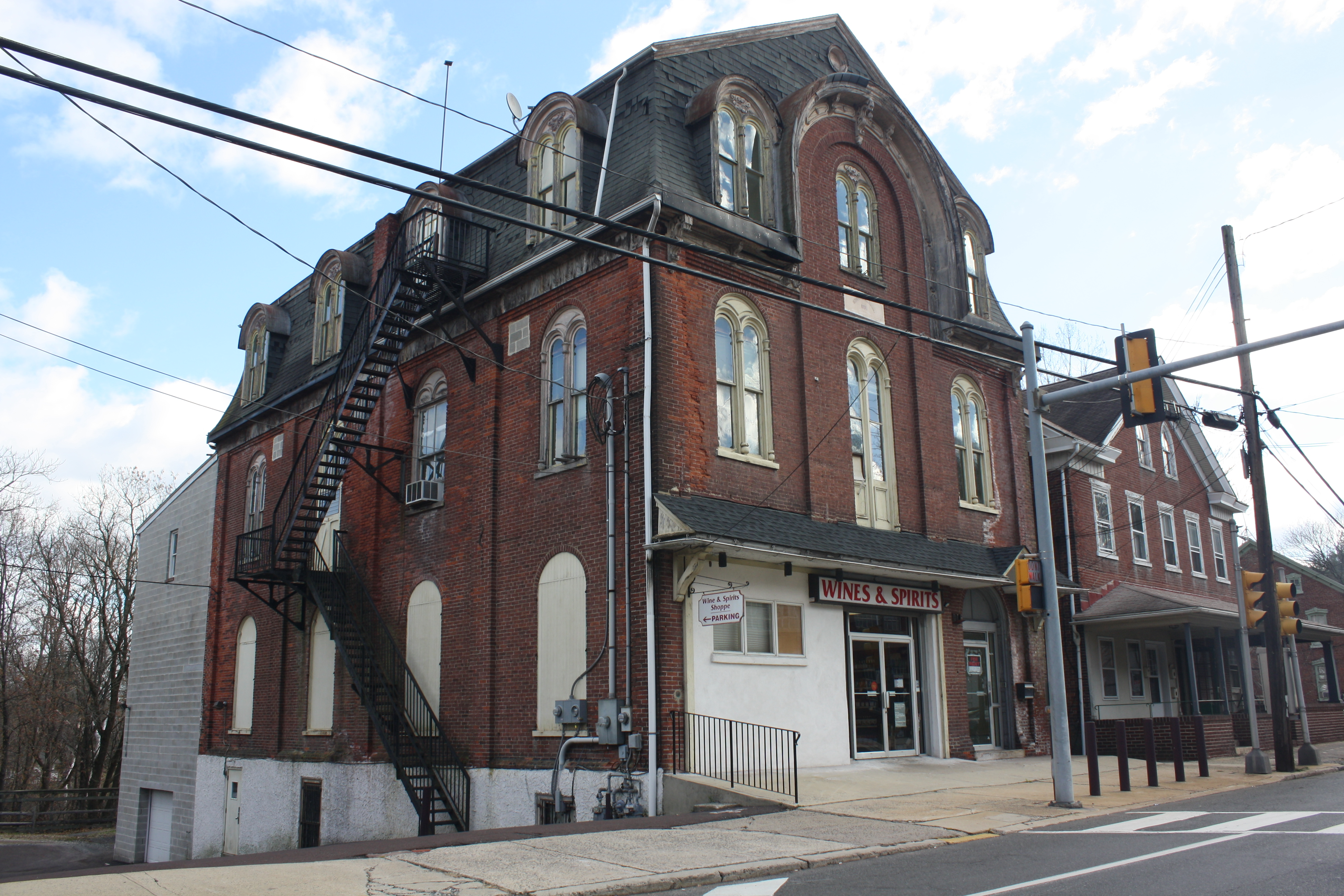
- Main Street in Schwenksville in November 2012

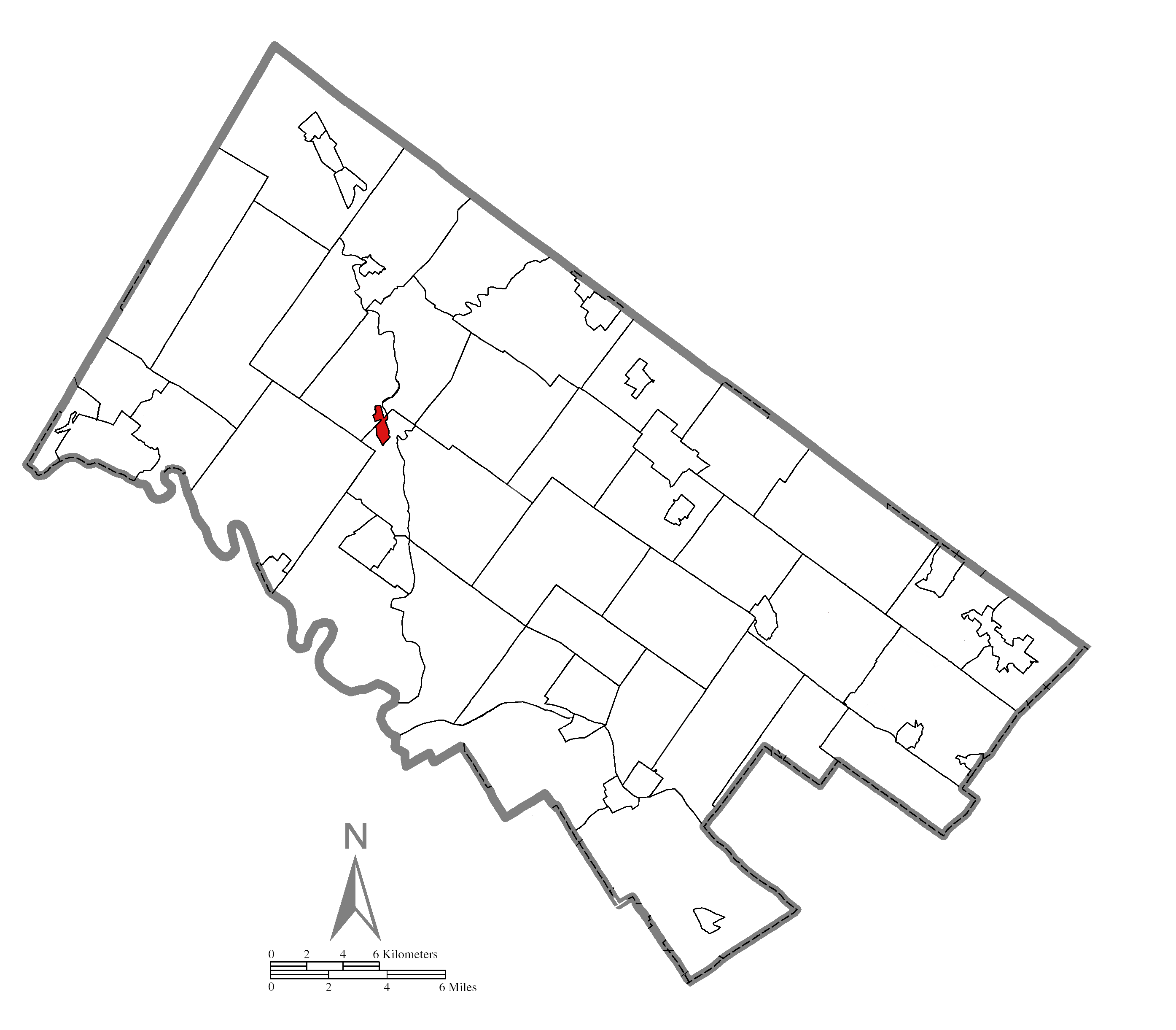
- Location of Schwenksville in Montgomery County, Pennsylvania

- Location of Schwenksville in Pennsylvania Schwenksville (the United States)
- Coordinates: 40°15′23″N 75°27′54″W
- Country: United States
- State: Pennsylvania
- County: Montgomery

Government
  - Type: Council-manager
  - Mayor: John Trudell Spina
  - Borough Manager: Dan DeMeno

Area
  - Total: 0.40 sq mi (1.04 km^{2})
  - Land: 0.40 sq mi (1.04 km^{2})
  - Water: 0.0039 sq mi (0.01 km^{2})
- Elevation: 213 ft (65 m)

Population (2020)
  - Total: 1,296
  - Density: 3,238.1/sq mi (1,250.23/km^{2})
- Time zone: UTC-5 (EST)
  - Summer (DST): UTC-4 (EDT)
- ZIP Code: 19473
- Area codes: 610 and 484
- FIPS code: 42-68328
- Website: https://www.schwenksville-pa.org/

Schwenksville is a borough in Montgomery County, Pennsylvania, United States. The population was 1,431 at the 2020 census. It is notable for being located near the site of the Philadelphia Folk Festival. The borough was founded in 1684, when the Lenni-Lenape Indians ceded to William Penn the land along the Perkiomen Creek; it was incorporated in 1903. The borough was named for George Schwenk, whose son, Jacob Schwenk, served in George Washington's army.

The town was the inspiration for the protagonist in Catherine Gilbert Murdock's 2006 novel Dairy Queen.

The Hall & Oates song "Perkiomen" was written about the Perkiomen Creek, which constitutes Schwenksville's eastern border. "Perkiomen" is Lenape for "muddy waters" and "where the cranberries grow."

Schwenksville is also the gateway to the Perkiomen Trail, a nineteen-mile section of the former Reading Railroad's Perkiomen Valley corridor. It now serves as a multi-use rail trail and was completed in 2003.

== Geography ==
Schwenksville is located at 40°15′23″N 75°27′54″W (40.256418, −75.465012).

According to the U.S. Census Bureau, the borough has a total area of 0.4 square miles (1.0 km^{2}), 0.4 square miles (1.0 km^{2}) of which is land and 2.38% of which is water.

=== Climate ===
The temperate climate of this region where Schwenksville Pennsylvania is located in Montgomery County, PA, consists of 4 discrete seasons: Winter, Spring, Summer, and Autumn. Winter temperatures depend on the frequency of Northerly fronts and can bring temperatures ranging from well below freezing, with wind chills in the tens and teens (0-20 degrees Fahrenheit). January is the coldest month of the year. Historically, rare warm fronts have briefly arrived in February bringing a day time temperature into 50-65 degree F (Fahrenheit)range. The amount of snowfall that Winter weather may or may not bring is variable from year to year. Early Spring typically brings variable temperatures,from cold and windy to mild temperatures,typically with periods of frequent showers. Spring might also bring the rare, short-lived snowfall. Summer temps arrive in late June and build from early days in the high 70's to high 80'sF to the mid and latter days of Summer when atmospheric conditions can result in a 'Bermuda High', bringing to the region 90+F daytime temperatures with sticky and uncomfortable relative humidity measuring above 90%. When a Bermuda High arrives it might be expected to stall over the region for a few days to a week, usually during early July to mid-August. Otherwise one might expect the Summer warmth to be accompanied by a range of relative humidity measured in the 20%-45% range. The cool of Autumn shows itself in September. The more exceptional late September and October days are brisk, and cloudless with the gorgeous contrast of the colorful Fall leaves against deep blue skies. It is not atypical to see a warm spell, or 'Indian Summer' in October when the low velocity winds are warm and the sky is clear. One can expect some rainy days with average daily temperatures between 50F and 65F, becoming steadily cooler by Halloween, and downright cold by Thanksgiving Day.

== History ==
General George Washington and the Continental Army camped in and around Schwenksville – September 26 to 29 and October 4 to 8, 1777 – prior to and immediately following the October 4 Battle of Germantown. Washington's headquarters probably was at the Henry Kelly House (demolished), just southwest of the town that he called "Pawling's Mill." The bulk of the Army camped on the opposite side of the Perkiomen Creek, at Pennypacker Mills.

The borough was originally part of Perkiomen Township and home to the first copper mine in Pennsylvania. Ice harvesting was a major industry in the area. Several large icehouses were located along the creek, and ice was regularly shipped to Philadelphia. Mills devoted to grain and textiles were also very prominent which is evident by the existing historic structures. Its location along the Perkiomen Creek made the Borough a great summer resort community during its early existence, and Schwenksville was once home to The Perkiomen Inn, Spring Mountain House, and The Woodside Inn.

It was home to the Schwenksville Union School District until amalgamation with the Perkiomen Joint School District to form Perkiomen Valley School District in 1969.

Today the Borough is a residential community. Commercial and industrial businesses are located along the Main Street corridor. Schwenksville Elementary School; the Perkiomen Valley Branch of the Montgomery County-Norristown Public Library; the Schwenksville post office; two banks; three churches - Heidelberg United Church of Christ, Jerusalem Lutheran, and Eden Mennonite; and a 6.47-acre park along the Perkiomen Creek are located within the borough.

The Pennypacker Mansion and Sunrise Mill are listed on the National Register of Historic Places.

== Demographics ==
Historical population
Census	Pop.	Note	%±
1880	303		—
1910	381		—
1920	337		−11.5%
1930	405		20.2%
1940	483		19.3%
1950	563		16.6%
1960	620		10.1%
1970	809		30.5%
1980	1,041		28.7%
1990	1,326		27.4%
2000	1,693		27.7%
2010	1,385		−18.2%
2020	1,296		−6.4%
U.S. Decennial Census

As of the 2020 census, the borough was 86.2% White, 9.22% Black or African American, 0.84% Asian, and 1.47% were two or more races. 2.31% of the population were of Hispanic or Latino ancestry .

There were 626 households, out of which 25.9% had children under the age of 18 living with them, 38.0% were married couples living together, 9.7% had a female householder with no husband present, and 47.8% were non-families. 40.1% of all households were made up of individuals, and 18.4% had someone living alone who was 65 years of age or older. The average household size was 2.13 and the average family size was 2.91.

In 2000, 17.7% of the population under the age of 18, with 26.5% from 18 to 24, 27.5% from 25 to 44, 15.2% from 45 to 64, and 13.1% who were 65 years of age or older. The median age was 30 years. For every 100 females there were 88.3 males. For every 100 females age 18 and over, there were 85.2 males.

The median income for a household in the borough was $44,514, and the median income for a family was $55,000. Males had a median income of $37,566 versus $31,200 for females. The per capita income for the borough was $19,679. About 3.3% of families and 5.4% of the population were below the poverty line, including 6.9% of those under age 18 and 12.2% of those age 65 or over.

== Politics and government ==
Presidential elections results
Year	Republican	Democratic
2020	44.9% 297	52.6% 348
2016	46.7% 266	46.3% 264
2012	45.4% 251	51.9% 287
2008	39.2% 220	59.5% 334
2004	50.7% 302	48.2% 287
2000	50.2% 222	45.5% 201

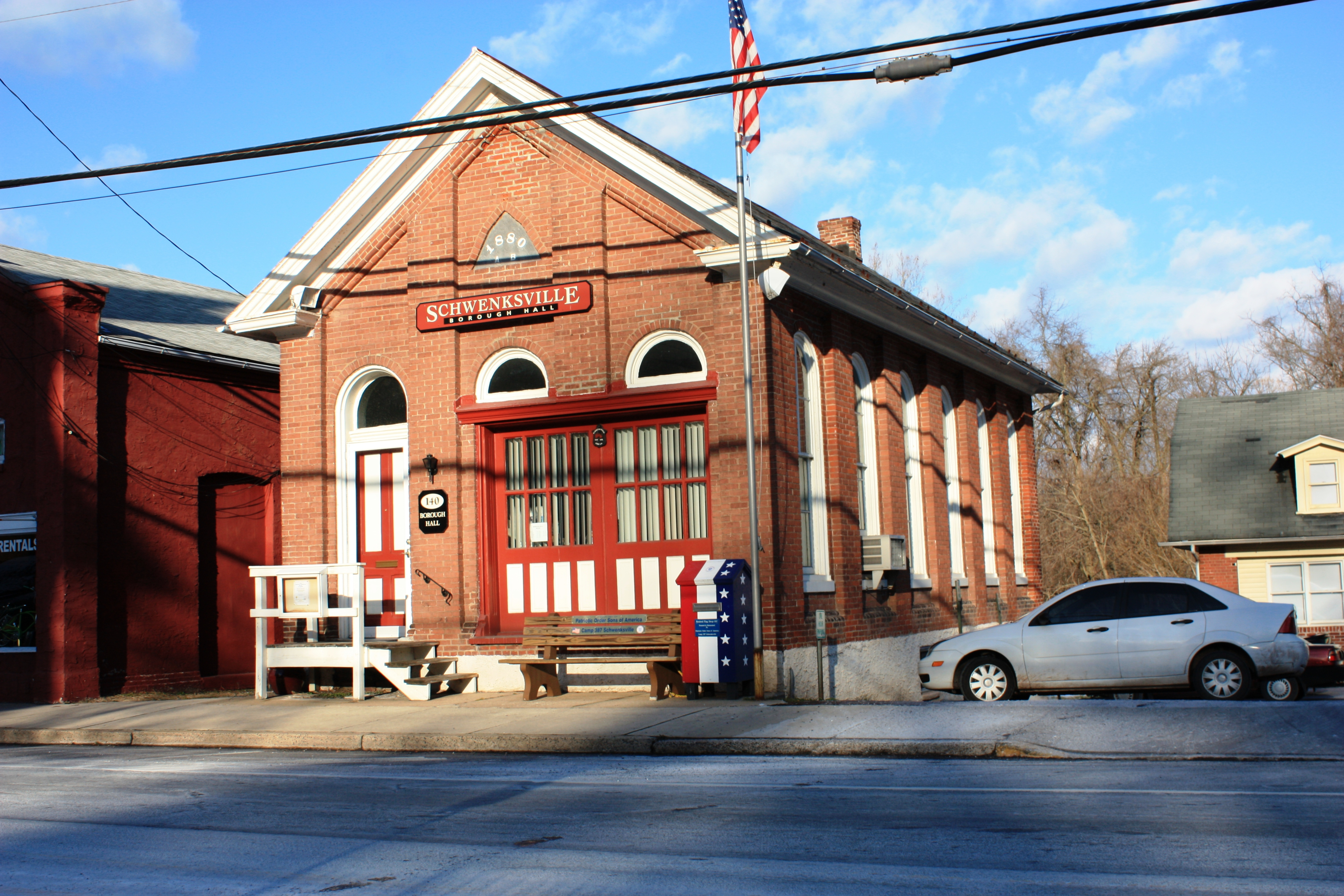
Schwenksville Borough Hall

Schwenksville has a city manager form of government with a mayor and a five-member borough council. In 2007, Democrats took control of the borough council for the first time in the borough's history. Currently, Council consists of 3 Democrats, 1 Republican, and 1 Independent.

The borough also has active Activity and Historical Committees. The goal of the Activity Committee is to plan and support various community activities to promote a sense of vitality in the community. Accordingly, Community Day was started in 2009 to promote the businesses and non-profit organizations in Schwenksville with a fun community event. Committee members may plan other events through the year as well. The Historic Committee was formed by the borough for the purpose of exploring ways to save meaningful older buildings from being destroyed and to keep the rich history of Schwenksville intact for future generations.

The borough is part of the Fourth Congressional District (represented by Rep. Madeleine Dean), Pennsylvania's 147th Representative District (represented by Rep. Matt Bradford) and the 24th State Senate District (represented by Sen. Tracy Pennycuick).

It is home to Meadow Park, which has a pavilion and provides a relaxing spot for people to walk and fish in the Creek. The borough intends to further develop the Park by adding a walking path and other activities as our funding and grant funding allow. The Perkiomen Trail also runs through the Schwenksville borough, providing access to recreational activities along the trail.

== Transportation ==
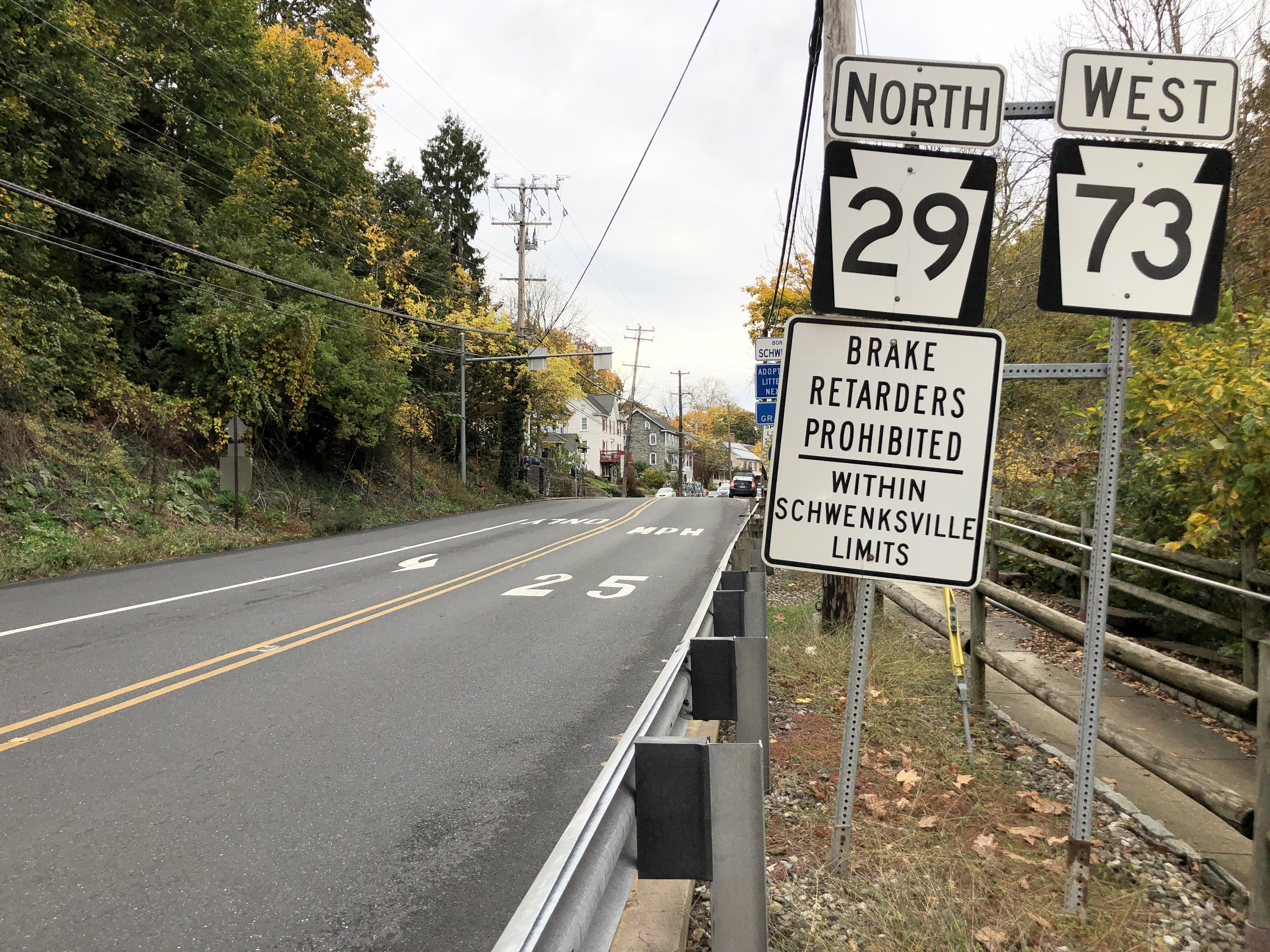
PA 29 and PA 73 in Schwenksville

As of 2020 there were 4.04 miles (6.50 km) of public roads in Schwenksville, of which 1.24 miles (2.00 km) were maintained by the Pennsylvania Department of Transportation (PennDOT) and 2.80 miles (4.51 km) were maintained by the borough.

Pennsylvania Route 29 and Pennsylvania Route 73 traverse the borough concurrently. The two routes follow Main Street on a general north-south alignment through the borough.

== Education ==
Schwenksville is part of the Perkiomen Valley School District.

Residents are zoned to Schwenksville Elementary School, Middle School West, and Perkiomen Valley High School.

== See also ==
- Pennypacker Mills
- Philadelphia Folk Festival
- Perkiomen Trail
- Perkiomen Creek
