= Pennsylvania Route 752 =

Former state highway in Pennsylvania, United States

Pennsylvania Route 752

Route information
- Maintained by Pennsylvania Department of Highways
- Length: 1.8 mi (2.9 km)
- Existed: 1930–1940

Major junctions
- South end: PA 63 in Horsham
- PA 463 in Horsham
- North end: US 611 in Horsham

Location
- Country: United States
- State: Pennsylvania

Highway system
- Pennsylvania State Route System; Interstate; US; State; Scenic; Legislative
← PA 747	→ PA 756

Pennsylvania Route 752 was a state highway located in Montgomery County, Pennsylvania. The route connected PA 63 to US 611 in Horsham between 1930 and 1940. The route is today known as Dresher Road.

== Route description ==
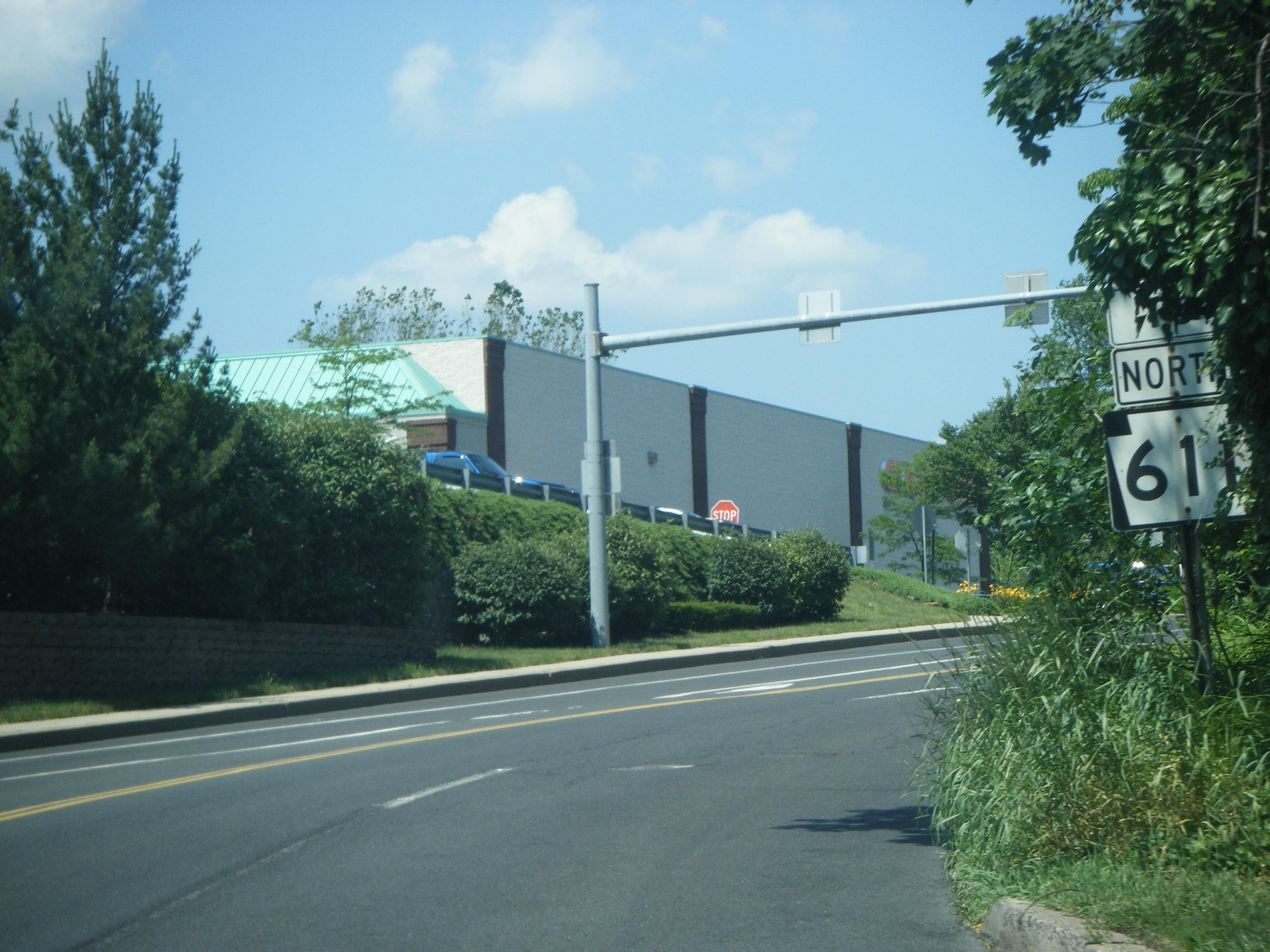
Dresher Road northbound past PA 463, approaching PA 611

PA 752 began at an intersection with PA 63 in Horsham Township, heading northeast on Dresher Road through rural areas. The route crossed Witmer Road and PA 463. PA 752 ended at an intersection with US 611 (now PA 611) in the community of Horsham. Today, Dresher Road is a four-lane undivided suburban highway passing several business parks and residential neighborhoods.

== History ==
PA 752 was first designated by 1930 to connect PA 63 to US 611. By 1940, the route was removed.

== Major intersections ==
The entire route was in Horsham Township, Montgomery County.

mi	km	Destinations	Notes
0.0	0.0	PA 63 (Welsh Road) – Willow Grove, Maple Glen	Southern terminus
1.6	2.6	PA 463 (Horsham Road) – Prospectville, Willow Grove	
1.8	2.9	US 611 (Easton Road)	Northern terminus
1.000 mi = 1.609 km; 1.000 km = 0.621 mi
