= Pennsylvania Route 463 =

State highway in Pennsylvania, US

Pennsylvania Route 463

Route information
- Maintained by PennDOT
- Length: 12.899 mi (20.759 km)
- Existed: 1928–present

Major junctions
- West end: PA 63 in Hatfield Township
- PA 309 / US 202 Bus. in Montgomeryville; US 202 in Montgomery Township; PA 152 in Prospectville
- East end: PA 611 in Horsham

Location
- Country: United States
- State: Pennsylvania
- Counties: Montgomery

Highway system
- Pennsylvania State Route System; Interstate; US; State; Scenic; Legislative
← PA 462	→ PA 464

Pennsylvania Route 463 (PA 463) is a 12.9-mile-long (20.8 km) state highway completely in Montgomery County, Pennsylvania. Its western terminus is at PA 63 in Hatfield Township and its eastern terminus is at PA 611 in Horsham. PA 463 runs through the northern suburbs of Philadelphia and passes through the towns of Hatfield, Montgomeryville, and Horsham. The route intersects PA 309, U.S. Route 202 Business (US 202 Bus.), and US 202 in Montgomeryville and PA 152 in Prospectville. Through its length, the route carries the names Forty Foot Road, Broad Street, Main Street, Cowpath Road, and Horsham Road. PA 463 was designated in 1928 and fully paved by 1940. In 2010, a portion of the route in Montgomery Township was widened.

== Route description ==
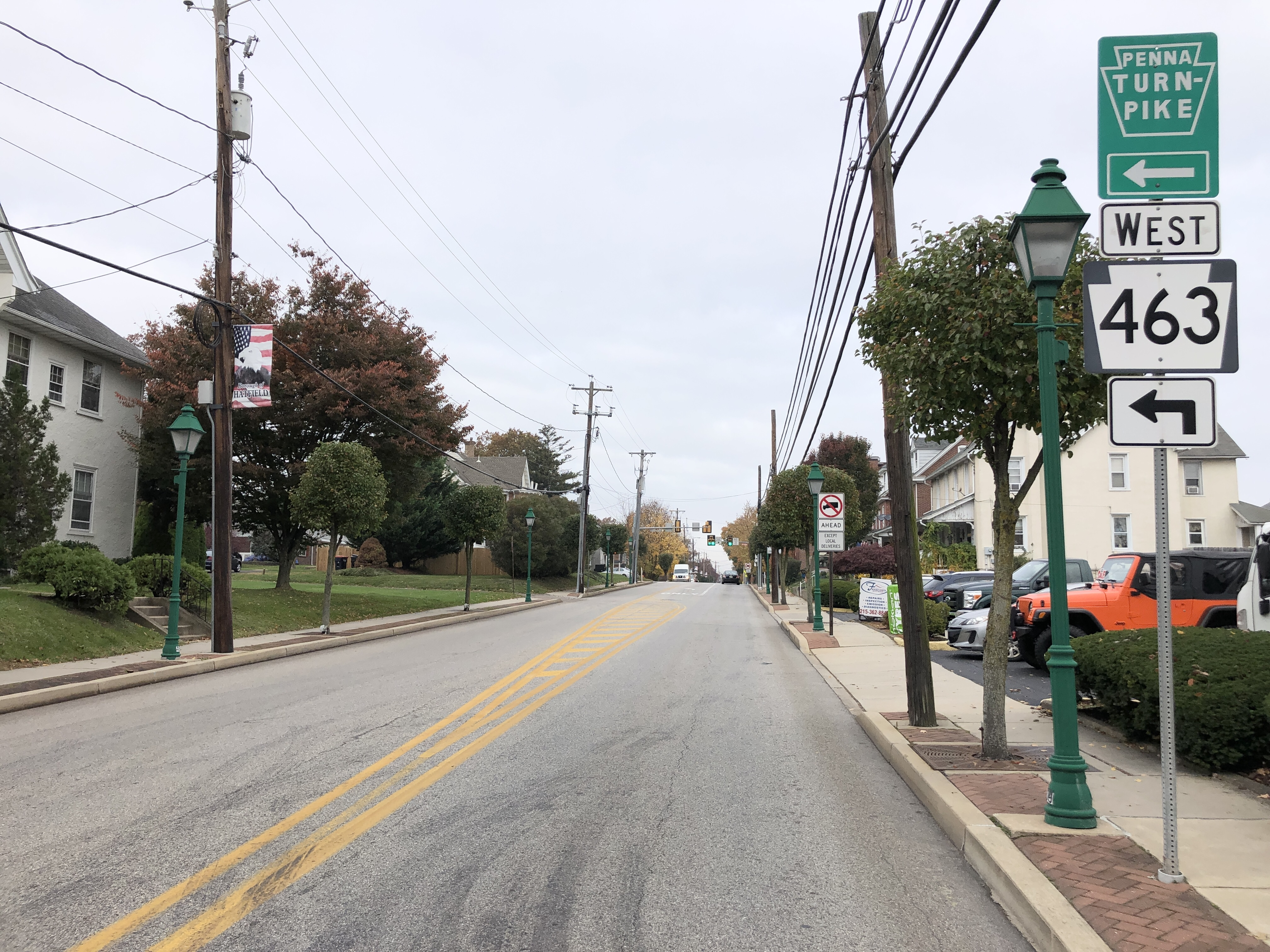
PA 463 westbound approaching Broad Street in Hatfield

PA 463 begins an intersection with PA 63 on the border of Hatfield Township and Towamencin Township in the North Penn Valley region, heading northeast on four-lane undivided Forty Foot Road into Hatfield Township. The road passes through commercial areas and housing developments and narrows to two lanes. The route continues into residential areas with a few businesses and enters the borough of Hatfield, where it becomes West Broad Street. In Hatfield, the road runs northeast to the center of town. Here, PA 463 turns to the southeast on South Main Street and passes more residential and commercial development, crossing the Liberty Bell Trail and the Bethlehem Line, a railroad line that is owned by SEPTA and operated by the Pennsylvania Northeastern Railroad, at-grade. The road continues back into Hatfield Township and becomes Cowpath Road, reaching a junction with Orvilla Road. The route crosses SEPTA's Lansdale/Doylestown Line at-grade southwest of the Fortuna station and intersects Broad Street in a commercial area.

Heading past more homes, PA 463 enters Montgomery Township at the Line Street intersection. The road comes to a junction with Taylor Road/Lansdale Avenue before it reaches the community of Montgomeryville, where PA 463 widens into a four-lane divided highway and intersects PA 309 (Bethlehem Pike) and US 202 Bus. at the Five Points intersection.

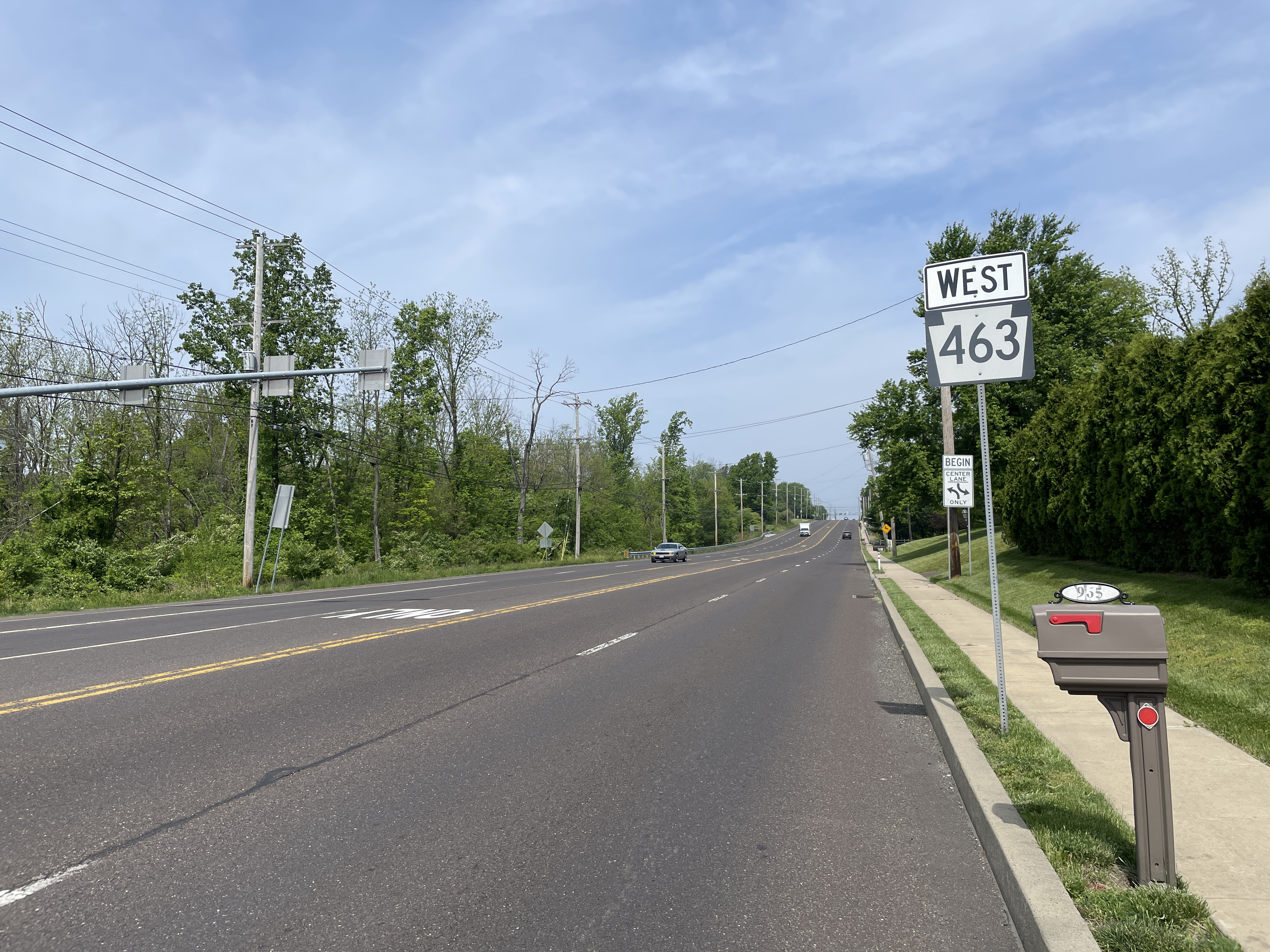
PA 463 westbound past Upper State Road in Montgomery Township

Past this intersection, the route becomes Horsham Road and passes near more businesses as it narrows into a three-lane road with a center left-turn lane and one travel lane in each direction. After crossing North Wales Road, the route carries five lanes total, with two travel lanes in each direction and a center left-turn lane, as it heads into residential areas. The road passes through commercial areas past the Upper State Road intersection and crosses the US 202 parkway and the US 202 Parkway Trail. The route heads across Little Neshaminy Creek before coming to a junction with Stump Road. Past Stump Road, PA 463 narrows to two lanes total and runs past residential areas and business parks, reaching intersections with Hartman Road and Kenas Road. Farther southeast, the route becomes the border between Horsham Township to the southwest and Montgomery Township to the northeast.

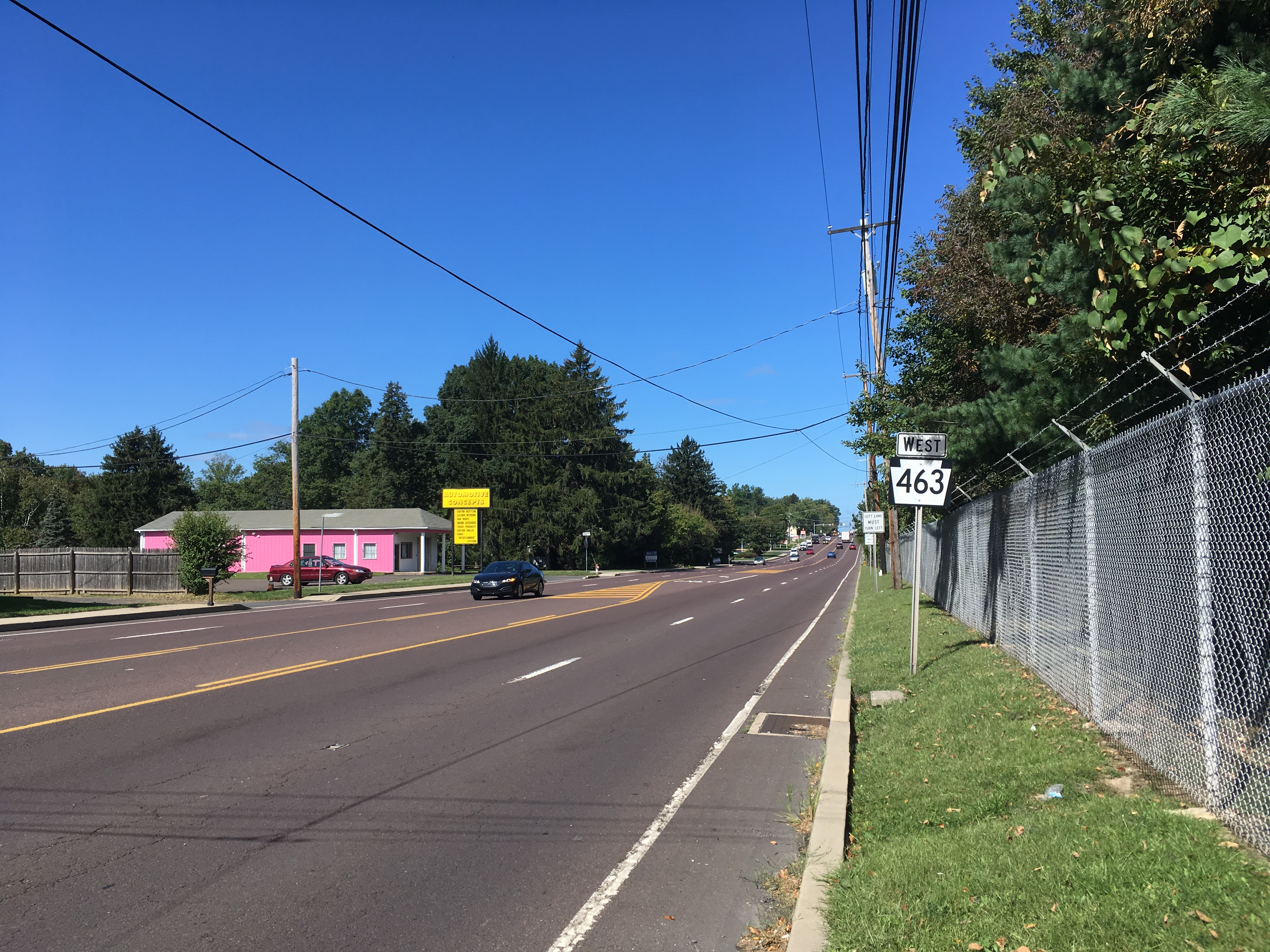
PA 463 westbound past Maple Avenue in Horsham Township

Upon crossing Lower State Road, PA 463 leaves the North Penn Valley region and fully enters Horsham Township, becoming a three-lane road with a center left-turn lane as it heads past housing subdivisions. The route loses the turning lane and continues southeast to an intersection with PA 152 in the village of Prospectville. At this intersection, PA 463 gains a center left-turn lane again and passes a few businesses before continuing between Deep Meadow Park to the north and Kohler Park to the south and crossing Park Creek. The road intersects Keith Valley Road and passes south of Samuel Carpenter Park. At the Babylon Road junction, the route becomes a five-lane road and runs to the northeast of Hatboro-Horsham Senior High School and past business parks before coming to Privet Road. At this point, PA 463 heads between the Biddle Air National Guard Base to the northeast and homes and businesses to the southwest, intersecting Norristown Road. The route reaches the edge of the air station property at the Maple Avenue junction. PA 463 continues past suburban development and intersects Dresher Road, where the center left-turn lane ends and the road becomes four lanes, before reaching its eastern terminus at PA 611 in the community of Horsham. At the eastern terminus, access from PA 463 to northbound PA 611 is provided by Dresher Road.

== History ==
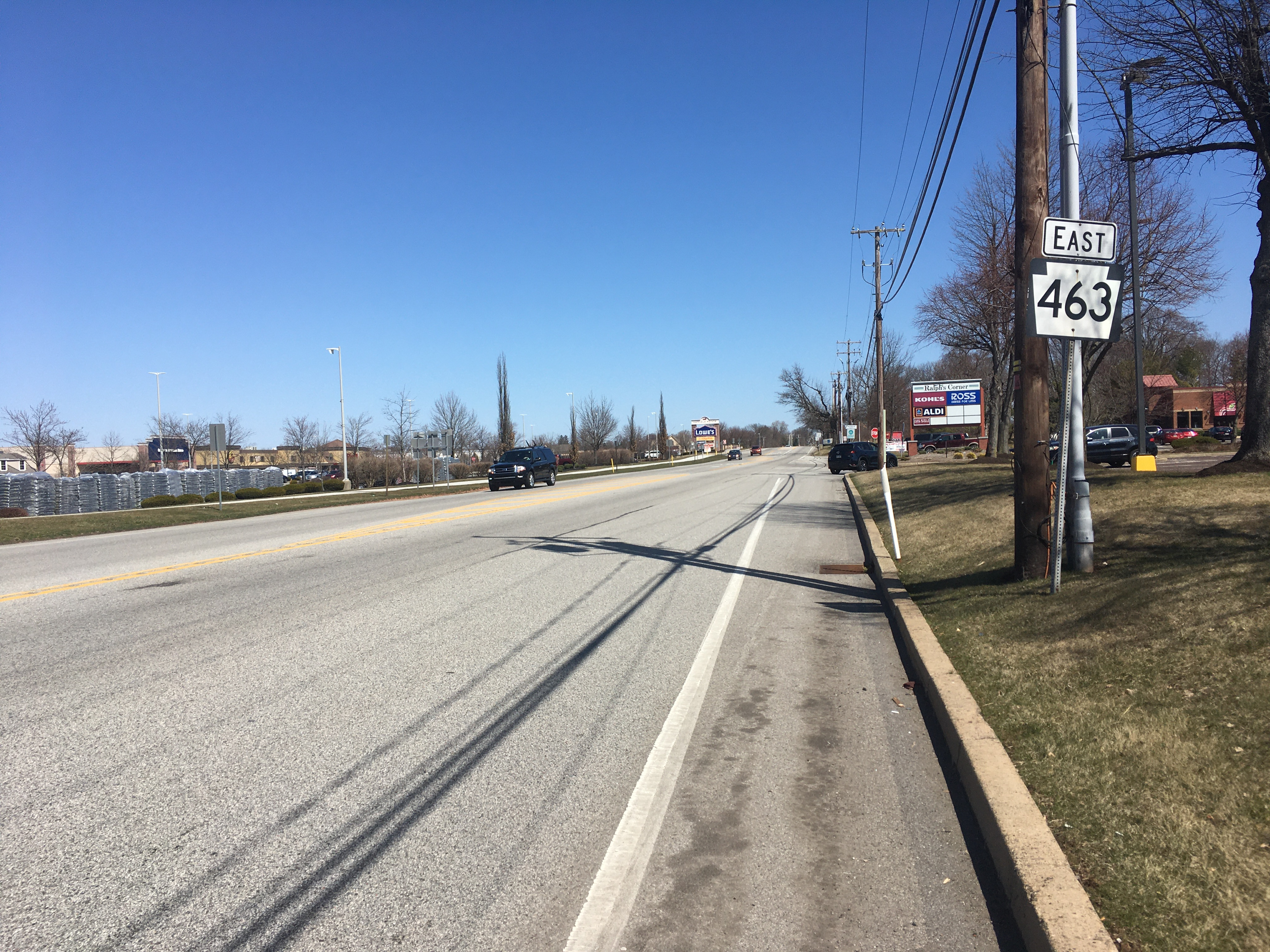
PA 463 eastbound past western terminus at PA 63 in Hatfield Township

When Pennsylvania first legislated routes in 1911, present-day PA 463 was not given a number. In 1928, PA 463 was designated onto its current alignment from PA 63 in Hatfield Township to US 611/PA 2 in Horsham. At this time, the route was paved between PA 63 and Hatfield. When first created, PA 463 intersected US 122/US 309/PA 12/PA 52 in Montgomery Township and PA 152 in Horsham Township. By 1930, PA 463 was paved in Horsham Township. At this time, it no longer intersected PA 12 and PA 52 and it now intersected PA 752 in Horsham Township. The remainder of PA 463 was paved by 1940. Also by this time, US 122 became US 202 and PA 463 no longer intersected PA 752, the first of several changes to the routes that intersected PA 463.

In 1968, the US 309 designation that the route intersected in Montgomeryville became PA 309. The route at the eastern terminus of PA 463 changed from US 611 to PA 611 in 1972. Construction began to widen the section of PA 463 between North Wales Road and General Hancock Boulevard into a five-lane road as part of the US 202 parkway project in 2009. The widening project was completed a year later.

== Major intersections ==
The entire route is in Montgomery County.

Location	mi	km	Destinations	Notes
Towamencin–Hatfield township line	0.000	0.000	PA 63 (Welsh Road / Forty Foot Road) to I-476 – Lansdale	Western terminus
Montgomery Township	5.257	8.460	PA 309 / US 202 Bus. (Bethlehem Pike / Doylestown Road) – Quakertown, Philadelphia, Doylestown	
Montgomery Township	6.251	10.060	US 202 – Doylestown, Norristown	
Horsham Township	9.169	14.756	PA 152 (Limekiln Pike) – Chalfont, Philadelphia	
Horsham Township	12.695	20.431	To PA 611 north (Easton Road)	Access via Dresher Road
Horsham Township	12.899	20.759	PA 611 south (Easton Road)	Eastern terminus
1.000 mi = 1.609 km; 1.000 km = 0.621 mi
