= Liberty Bell Trail =

Rail trail in Pennsylvania, USA

- Length: 25 mi (40 km) (projected)
- Location: Bucks / Montgomery counties, Pennsylvania, USA
- Trailheads: East Norriton Township to Quakertown
- Use: Multi-use
- Difficulty: Easy
- Season: Year-round

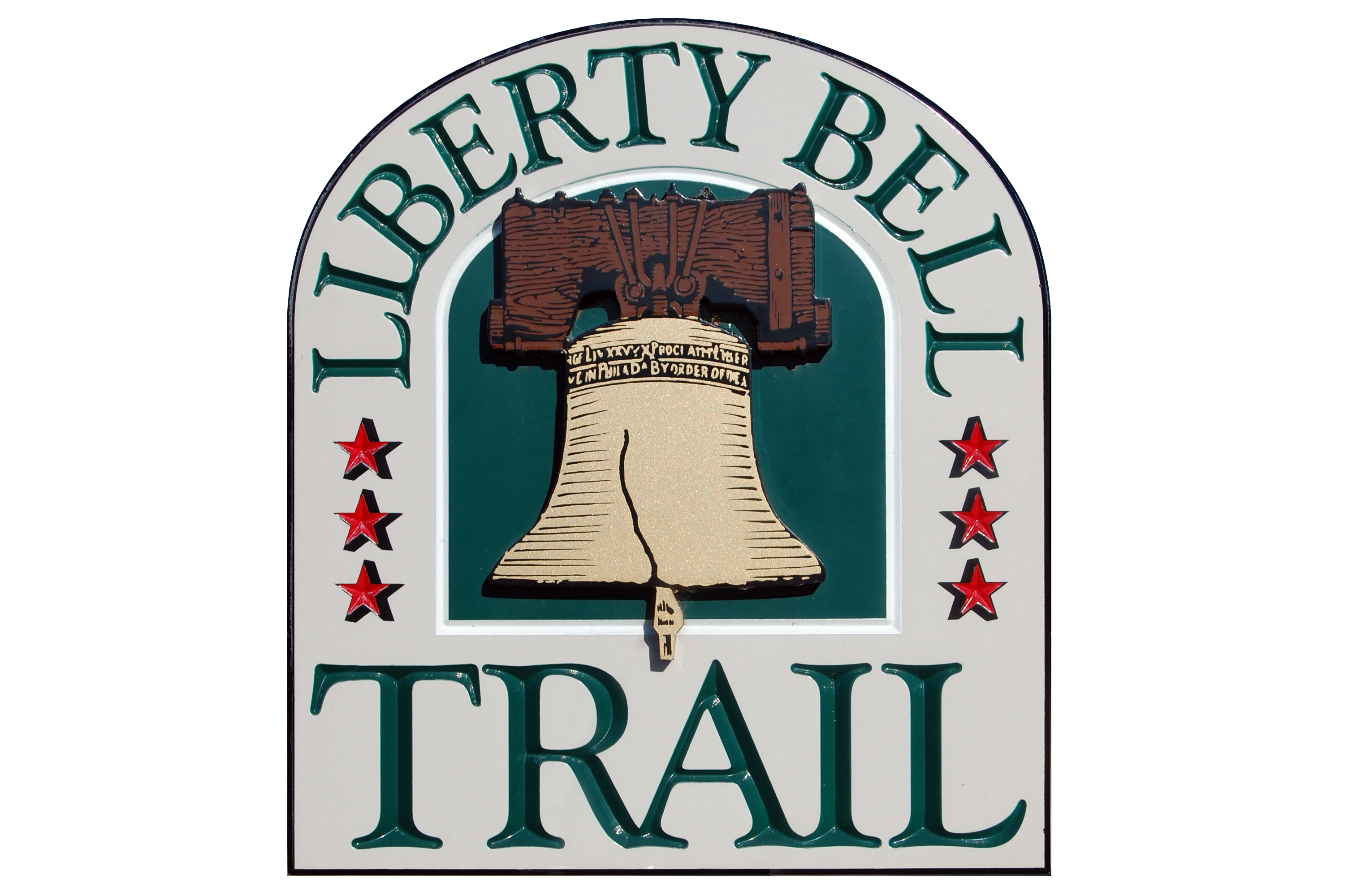

The Liberty Bell Trail is a suburban rail trail under construction in southeastern Pennsylvania.

When complete it will cover 25 miles (40 km) in suburban southeastern Pennsylvania, traveling from East Norriton Township in Montgomery County to Quakertown in Bucks County.

It was proposed in 1996, and partially follows the former path of the now defunct Liberty Bell Trolley Route, which had been operated by the Lehigh Valley Transit Company from around 1900 to 1951.

The tram route was named by the company for the Liberty Bell because a branch of it followed Bethlehem Pike, the road along which the bell was transported in September 1777 when it was being moved from Philadelphia to Northamptontown (now Allentown) for safekeeping shortly before the British occupation of Philadelphia during the American Revolutionary War. The trail has been named for both the trolley route and the bell.

The route passes through 15 municipalities (from south to north):

- East Norriton Township
- Whitpain Township
- Upper Gwynedd Township
- Lansdale Borough
- Hatfield Township
- Hatfield Borough
- Franconia Township
- Souderton Borough
- Telford Borough
- West Rockhill Township
- Hilltown Township
- Sellersville Borough
- Perkasie Borough
- Richland Township
- Quakertown Borough

== See also ==
- Frederick Leaser
