= Montgomery Square, Pennsylvania =

Unincorporated community in Pennsylvania, US

- Unincorporated community
- Location within Pennsylvania Location within the United States
- Coordinates: 40°14′06″N 75°14′25″W
- Country: United States
- State: Pennsylvania
- County: Montgomery
- Township: Montgomery
- Elevation: 440 ft (130 m)
- Time zone: UTC-5 (Eastern (EST))
  - Summer (DST): UTC-4 (EDT)
- ZIP code: 19454
- Area codes: 215, 267 and 445
- GNIS feature ID: 1181465

Montgomery Square is an unincorporated community in Montgomery Township in Montgomery County, Pennsylvania, United States. Montgomery Square is located at the intersection of Pennsylvania Route 309 (Bethlehem Pike) and U.S. Route 202 Business (Dekalb Pike)/Upper State Road. It is the de facto downtown of Montgomery Township.
