= Fitzwatertown, Pennsylvania =

Unincorporated community in Pennsylvania, US

Fitzwatertown
- Unincorporated community
- Location of Fitzwatertown in Pennsylvania Fitzwatertown (the United States)
- Coordinates: 40°07′30.52″N 75°09′54.22″W
- Country: United States
- State: Pennsylvania
- County: Montgomery
- Township: Upper Dublin
- Elevation: 222 ft (68 m)
- Time zone: UTC-5 (EST)
  - Summer (DST): UTC-4 (EDT)
- Area codes: 215, 267 and 445

Fitzwatertown is an unincorporated community located in Montgomery County, Pennsylvania, in the United States. The community is in Upper Dublin Township, 2.13 miles (3.43 km) south of Jarrettown, 2.5 miles (4.0 km) west of Abington, 1.1 miles south of Dreshertown, 1 mile (1.6 km) northeast of Oreland and approximately 12.3 miles (19.8 km) north of Philadelphia.

Fitzwatertown is located at the intersection of Limekiln Pike, Fitzwatertown Road and Jenkintown Road.

== History ==
Thomas Fitzwater arrived and laid out the road to Abington that became the Limekiln Pike in 1725.

Bean's History of Montgomery County, Pennsylvania describes Fitzwatertown as follows:

Fitzwatertown is situated in the southern part of the township, on the Limekiln turnpike, in the midst of the fertile valley of Sandy Run, abounding in limestone and iron-ore. This is an old settlement where Thomas Fitzwater followed lime-burning before the summer of 1705 and had a grist-mill erected at an early period. It contains a store hotel, wheel-wright and blacksmith-shop, grist-mill and about twelve house. The post-office was established here before 1858. The value of lime produced in Upper Dublin for 1840 was stated to be twenty thousand two hundred and seventy-five dollars, which was all produced in this vicinity, but the business has since been greatly increased through railroad facilities. Edge Hill Station, of the North Pennsylvania Railroad, is only a mile distant; yet, with all its surpassing advantages, as may be observed, has made but very little progress for the last half-century. The grist-mill mentioned was long carried on by John Price and is now, owned by Samuel Conrad. Sandy Run is a steady stream rising at the Moreland line, about three miles distant.

=== 19th century ===
In 1870, about 13% of the population of Abington Township were Irish-born; 11% of Upper Dublin Township were Irish-born. In 1865, Thomas and Elizabeth Carolan, Irish emigrants, moved onto the Garrett Hendrick farm to the east of Fitzwatertown, in Abington Township; they moved from a farm near Willow Grove in the Upper Moreland Township. Thomas died in 1870 and Elizabeth in 1876. Their eldest son, his wife and children moved near the Fitzwater Mill (still standing today at 1783 Limekiln Pike) in the center of Fitzwatertown, where he provided blacksmith services until 1882 when the family moved to Feltonville-Rowlandville and then to Franklinville about 1890.

The historic Fitzwater Homestead—which dates to the 18th century—remains, and under an agreement with the LuLu Country Club and Upper Dublin Township has been preserved.
