= Montgomeryville, Pennsylvania =

Unincorporated community in Pennsylvania, US

- Census-designated place
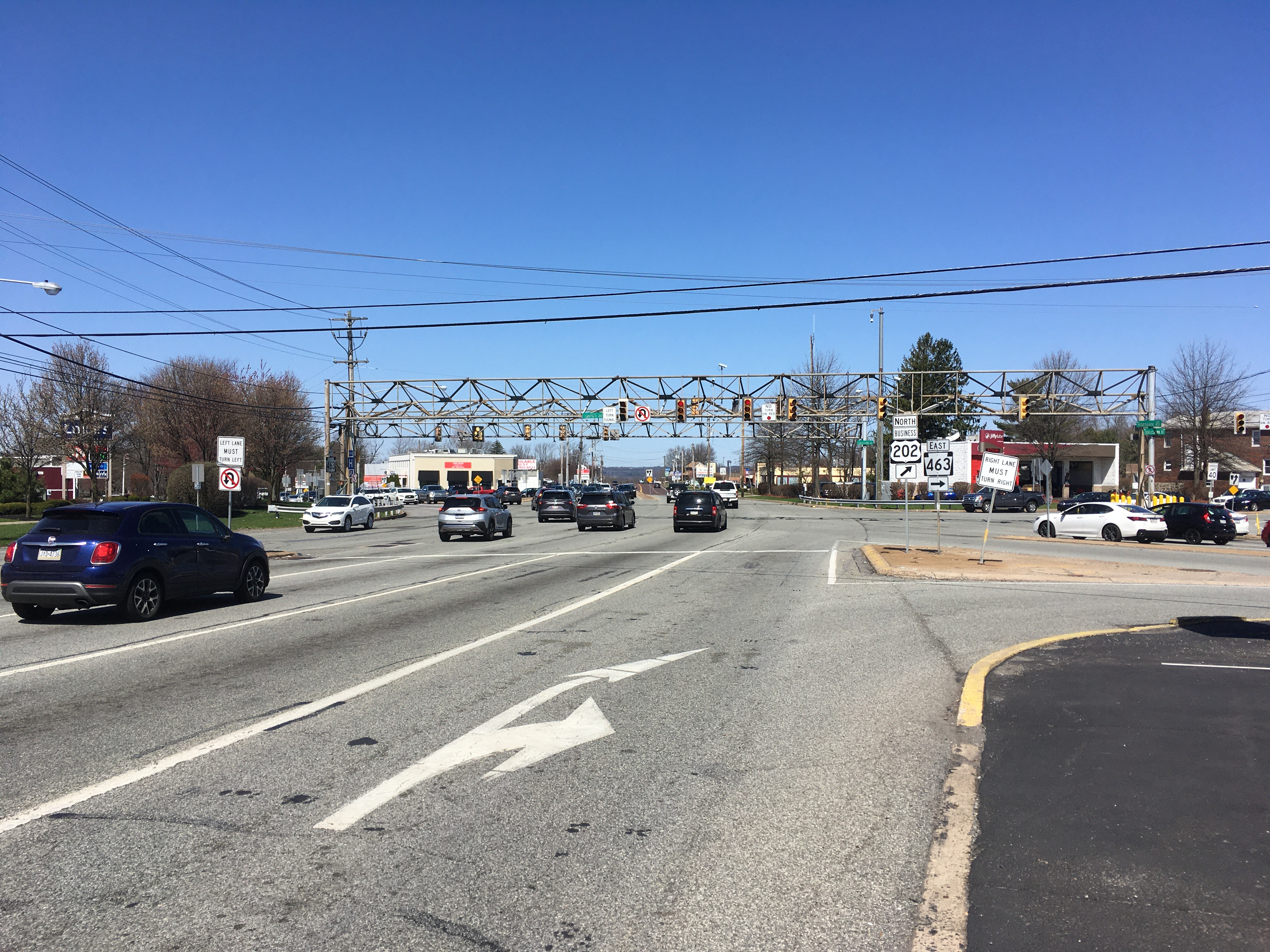
- Five Points intersection in Montgomeryville

- Location within Pennsylvania Location within the United States
- Coordinates: 40°14′50″N 75°14′38″W
- Country: United States
- State: Pennsylvania
- County: Montgomery
- Township: Montgomery

Area
  - Total: 4.76 sq mi (12.32 km^{2})
  - Land: 4.76 sq mi (12.32 km^{2})
  - Water: 0 sq mi (0.00 km^{2})
- Elevation: 459 ft (140 m)

Population (2020)
  - Total: 12,998
  - Density: 2,733.4/sq mi (1,055.38/km^{2})
- Time zone: UTC-5 (Eastern (EST))
  - Summer (DST): UTC-4 (EDT)
- ZIP code: 18936
- Area codes: 215, 267, and 445
- GNIS feature ID: 1181466

Montgomeryville is a census-designated place (CDP) in Montgomery Township, Montgomery County, Pennsylvania, United States. The population was 12,624 at the 2010 census. According to a 2010 Forbes magazine/Yahoo.com survey, Montgomeryville ranks 5th in America's top 10 affordable suburbs. It is part of the North Penn Valley region that is centered on the borough of Lansdale.

Montgomeryville is located 29 miles (47 km) southeast of Allentown and 21 miles (34 km) north of Philadelphia.

== Geography ==
Montgomeryville is located at 40°15′1″N 75°14′16″W (40.250388, -75.237819).

According to the United States Census Bureau, the CDP has a total area of 4.8 square miles (12 km^{2}), all land.

== Demographics ==
Historical population
Census	Pop.	Note	%±
1990	9,114		—
2000	12,031		32.0%
2010	12,624		4.9%
2020	12,998		3.0%

=== 2020 census ===
As of the 2020 census, Montgomeryville had a population of 12,998. The median age was 44.3 years. 20.8% of residents were under the age of 18 and 17.1% of residents were 65 years of age or older. For every 100 females there were 93.8 males, and for every 100 females age 18 and over there were 91.3 males age 18 and over.

100.0% of residents lived in urban areas, while 0.0% lived in rural areas.

There were 4,666 households in Montgomeryville, of which 33.5% had children under the age of 18 living in them. Of all households, 65.6% were married-couple households, 10.5% were households with a male householder and no spouse or partner present, and 19.7% were households with a female householder and no spouse or partner present. About 18.1% of all households were made up of individuals and 7.5% had someone living alone who was 65 years of age or older.

There were 4,770 housing units, of which 2.2% were vacant. The homeowner vacancy rate was 0.3% and the rental vacancy rate was 4.0%.

Racial composition as of the 2020 census
Race	Number	Percent
White	9,163	70.5%
Black or African American	676	5.2%
American Indian and Alaska Native	18	0.1%
Asian	2,388	18.4%
Native Hawaiian and Other Pacific Islander	1	0.0%
Some other race	127	1.0%
Two or more races	625	4.8%
Hispanic or Latino (of any race)	440	3.4%

=== 2010 census ===
As of the 2010 census, there were 12,624 people living in the CDP. The racial makeup of the CDP was 77.5% White Non-Hispanic, 14.6% Asian, 4.4% African American, 0.06% American Indian, 1.1% were two or more races, and 0.07% were some other race. 2.3% of the population were of Hispanic or Latino ancestry.

=== 2000 census ===
As of the census of 2000, there were 12,031 people, 4,114 households, and 3,278 families living in the CDP. The population density was 2,521.8 inhabitants per square mile (973.7/km^{2}). There were 4,158 housing units at an average density of 871.5 per square mile (336.5/km^{2}). The racial makeup of the CDP was 87.55% White, 3.26% African American, 0.06% Native American, 7.75% Asian, 0.02% Pacific Islander, 0.40% from other races, and 0.96% from two or more races. Hispanic or Latino of any race were 1.37% of the population.

There were 4,114 households, out of which 43.4% had children under the age of 18 living with them, 70.7% were married couples living together, 6.4% had a female householder with no husband present, and 20.3% were non-families. 16.2% of all households were made up of individuals, and 3.5% had someone living alone who was 65 years of age or older. The average household size was 2.87 and the average family size was 3.26.

In the CDP, the population was spread out, with 29.9% under the age of 18, 4.5% from 18 to 24, 33.8% from 25 to 44, 23.2% from 45 to 64, and 8.6% who were 65 years of age or older. The median age was 36 years. For every 100 females, there were 97.1 males. For every 100 females age 18 and over, there were 93.1 males.

The median income for a household in the CDP was $80,097, and the median income for a family was $90,391. Males had a median income of $55,777 versus $38,796 for females. The per capita income for the CDP was $28,967. About 1.7% of families and 1.9% of the population were below the poverty line, including 1.4% of those under age 18 and 2.8% of those age 65 or over.

== Transportation ==
Five Points is an intersection located at 40° 14′ 50.67″ N and 75° 14′ 39.37″ W, in Montgomeryville. It is the intersection of PA 309, PA 463, and US 202 Business. PA 309 runs north–south on Bethlehem Pike, PA 463 runs northwest–southeast on Cowpath Road/Horsham Road, and US 202 Business runs south along PA 309 and northeast along Doylestown Road, therefore creating five different roads.

Within the town, the US 202 Parkway runs through the southern portions from southwest–northeast.

Montgomeryville is served by SEPTA Suburban Division bus routes 94, 96, and 132, all of which stop at the Montgomery Mall. Route 94 connects the mall to the Chestnut Hill neighborhood of Philadelphia, Route 96 connects Montgomeryville with Lansdale and the Norristown Transportation Center in Norristown, and Route 132 runs from the mall to Telford. The bus routes provide connections to SEPTA Regional Rail's Lansdale/Doylestown Line in nearby Lansdale and North Wales.

== Education ==
It is part of the North Penn School District

== Notable people ==
- Winfield Scott Hancock, U.S. Army officer in the Civil War; Democratic candidate for presidency in 1880.
- ROZES, singer (most popular with featuring in The Chainsmokers' song "Roses" - which peaked at #6 on Billboard Hot 100).
