= Pennsylvania Route 152 =

State highway in Pennsylvania, US

Pennsylvania Route 152
- PA 152 in red and PA 152 Truck in blue

Route information
- Maintained by PennDOT
- Length: 25.317 mi (40.744 km)
- Existed: 1928–present

Major junctions
- South end: PA 309 in Cheltenham Township
- PA 73 in Cheltenham Township; PA 63 in Maple Glen; PA 463 in Prospectville; US 202 in Warrington Township; US 202 Bus. in Chalfont; PA 113 in Silverdale
- North end: PA 309 near Telford

Location
- Country: United States
- State: Pennsylvania
- Counties: Montgomery, Bucks

Highway system
- Pennsylvania State Route System; Interstate; US; State; Scenic; Legislative
← PA 151	→ PA 153

Pennsylvania Route 152 (PA 152) is a 25.3-mile-long (40.7 km) state highway located in the U.S. state of Pennsylvania. The route travels north–south from an interchange with PA 309 located in the Cedarbrook neighborhood of Cheltenham Township in Montgomery County north to another interchange with PA 309 located northeast of Telford in Bucks County. PA 152 is known as Limekiln Pike for most of its length. From the southern terminus, the route passes through suburban areas to the north of Philadelphia, serving Dresher, Maple Glen, and Chalfont. North of Chalfont, PA 152 runs through rural suburbs of Philadelphia before reaching Silverdale. Past here, the road continues northwest to Perkasie, where it turns southwest and passes through Sellersville before reaching its northern terminus.

What is now PA 152 was originally Limekiln Road, a road built to transport lime from area kilns. The road was a turnpike between the 1850s and 1917. The route was first designated in 1928 to run from U.S. Route 611 (US 611) in North Philadelphia north to PA 113 in Silverdale. PA 152 was extended north to US 309 in Sellersville in 1946, replacing the former routing of PA 413 between Perkasie and Sellersville. By 1960, the southern terminus of the route was cut back to its current location. PA 152 was extended west to end at PA 309 near Telford by 1970.

== Route description ==
=== Montgomery County ===
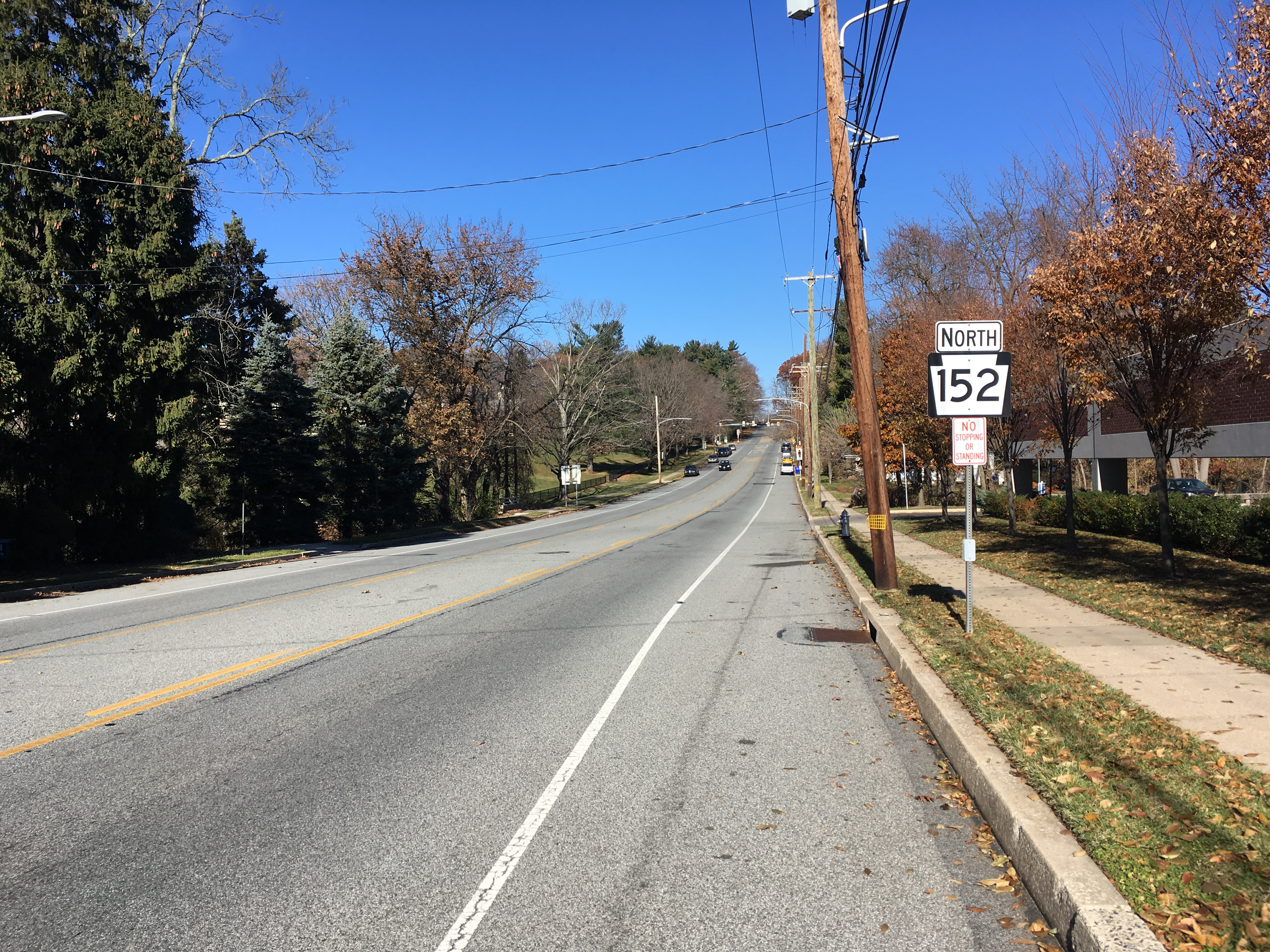
PA 152 northbound past PA 73 in Glenside

PA 152 begins at a diamond interchange with PA 309 (Fort Washington Expressway) in the community of Cedarbrook, located in Cheltenham Township, Montgomery County, about 3,000 feet (910 m) north of the Philadelphia city line and near the Cheltenham Township community of Wyncote. From this interchange, the route proceeds northeast on four-lane divided Easton Road, passing to the east of Arcadia University and to the northwest of Cheltenham High School. PA 152 turns north onto Limekiln Pike and intersects PA 73 (Church Road), crossing the Tacony Creek and running through residential and business areas in Glenside as a three-lane road with a center left-turn lane before losing the turn lane as it passes through the community of Edge Hill, where it has a junction with Willow Grove Avenue. The route curves northeast and comes to a bridge over SEPTA's Lansdale/Doylestown Line, where it enters Abington Township. Immediately after the bridge, PA 152 turns northwest at an intersection with Mt. Carmel Avenue and Edge Hill Road to remain along Limekiln Pike, making a curve back to the north a short distance later at a junction where Mt. Carmel Avenue heads northwest.

The road continues north into Upper Dublin Township. PA 152 passes through a golf course before reaching an intersection with Jenkintown Road and Fitzwatertown Road in the community of Fitzwatertown, where it turns northwest and crosses Sandy Run. PA 152 heads north through areas of homes with some businesses, intersecting Dreshertown Road, before curving northeast and coming to a junction with Susquehanna Road.

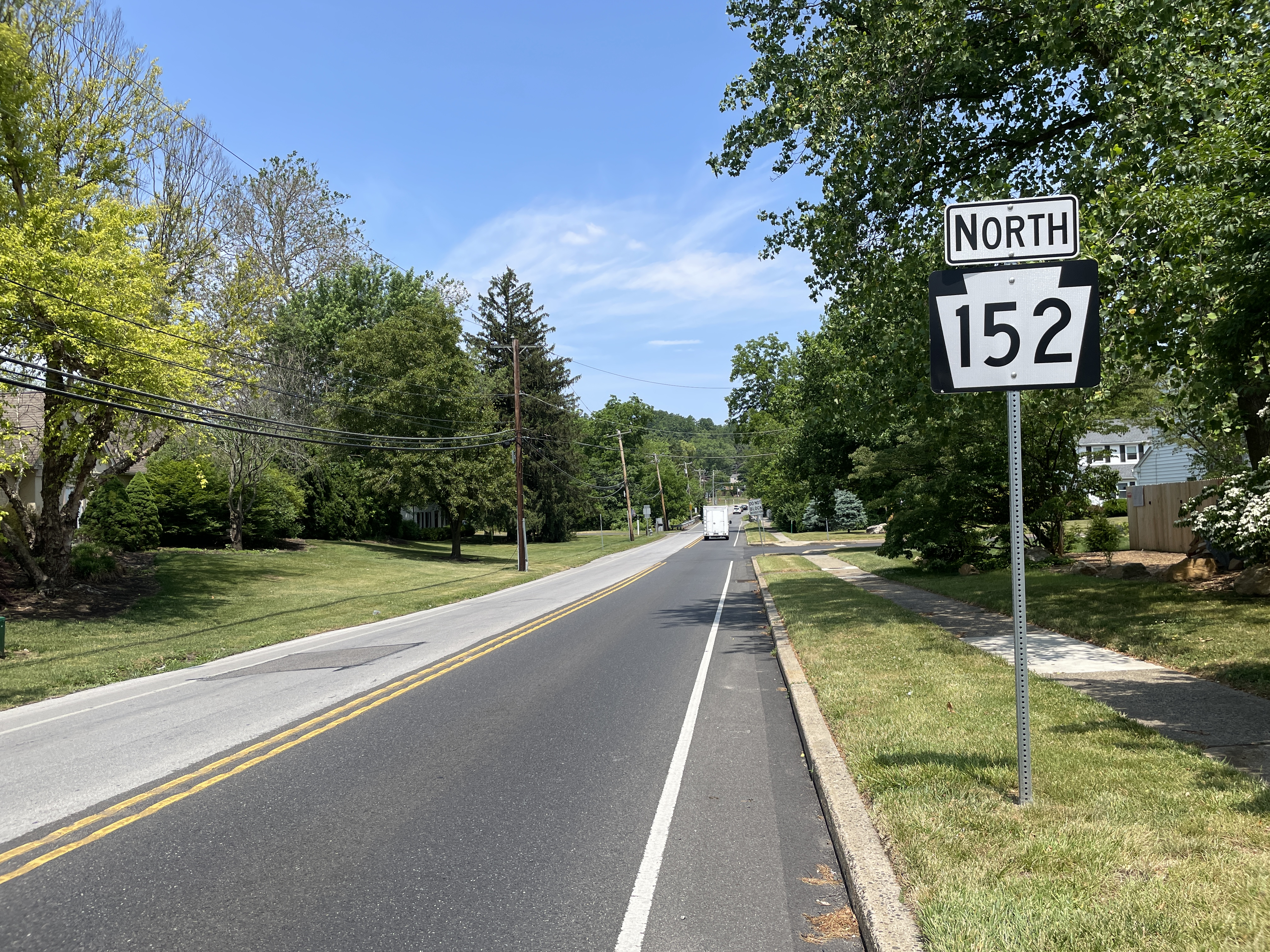
PA 152 northbound in Upper Dublin Township

Here, the route turns northwest and crosses under Norfolk Southern's Morrisville Line and the Pennsylvania Turnpike (Interstate 276) as a three-lane road with one northbound lane and two southbound lanes. Immediately after the Pennsylvania Turnpike bridge, Susquehanna Road splits to the northwest and PA 152 continues north along Limekiln Pike, passing businesses in the community of Dresher. The road becomes two lanes again and comes almost immediately to an intersection with Virginia Drive/Dreshertown Road, with Virginia Drive continuing westward to exit 340 of the Pennsylvania Turnpike, providing access to and from the westbound direction of the turnpike in Fort Washington. PA 152 continues northwest through residential neighborhoods, running through the community of Jarrettown. The route curves to the north, intersecting Fort Washington Avenue, and reaches the community of Maple Glen, where it crosses Norristown Road and PA 63 (Welsh Road) near businesses. At the junction with the latter, PA 152 enters Horsham Township and continues through residential areas to an intersection with Butler Pike. Farther north, the route crosses Park Creek and the Power Line Trail.

In the community of Prospectville, the road comes to an intersection with PA 463 (Horsham Road). Past this intersection, the route continues north between a cemetery to the west and a golf course to the east before heading through a mix of farmland, woods, and homes. PA 152 intersects Lower State Road and turns northeast, running along the border between Montgomery Township to the northwest and Horsham Township to the southeast and crossing the Little Neshaminy Creek. PA 152 turns north and fully enters Montgomery Township, which is in the North Penn Valley region, coming to an intersection with County Line Road in the community of Eureka. Here, the route turns northwest to briefly follow County Line Road.

=== Bucks County ===
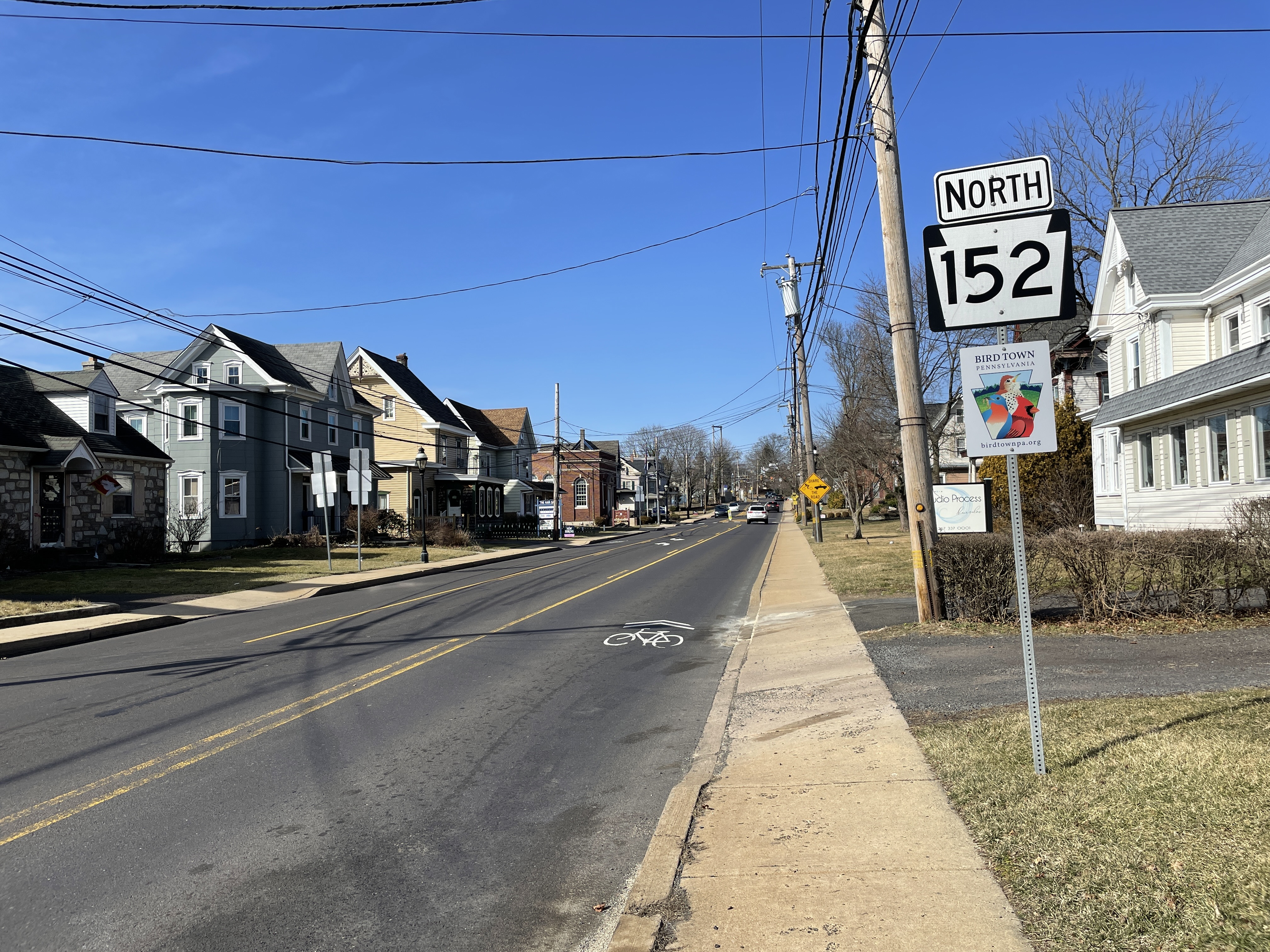
PA 152 northbound past US 202 Bus. in Chalfont

Past County Line Road, PA 152 continues north along Limekiln Pike, leaving the North Penn Valley region and entering Warrington Township in Bucks County. The route comes to an intersection with the US 202 parkway and the US 202 Parkway Trail before it curves to the northwest. After crossing Upper State Road, PA 152 enters New Britain Township and continues north past homes. PA 152 curves northwest soon after and enters the borough of Chalfont. The route intersects US 202 Bus. and turns northeast to form a concurrency with that route on Butler Avenue, crossing the West Branch Neshaminy Creek and heading into a business district. PA 152 splits from US 202 Bus. by turning northwest onto Main Street. The road passes homes and commercial development, coming to a bridge over SEPTA's Lansdale/Doylestown Line east of the Chalfont station. PA 152 curves north before it runs along the border between New Britain Township to the west and Chalfont to the east.

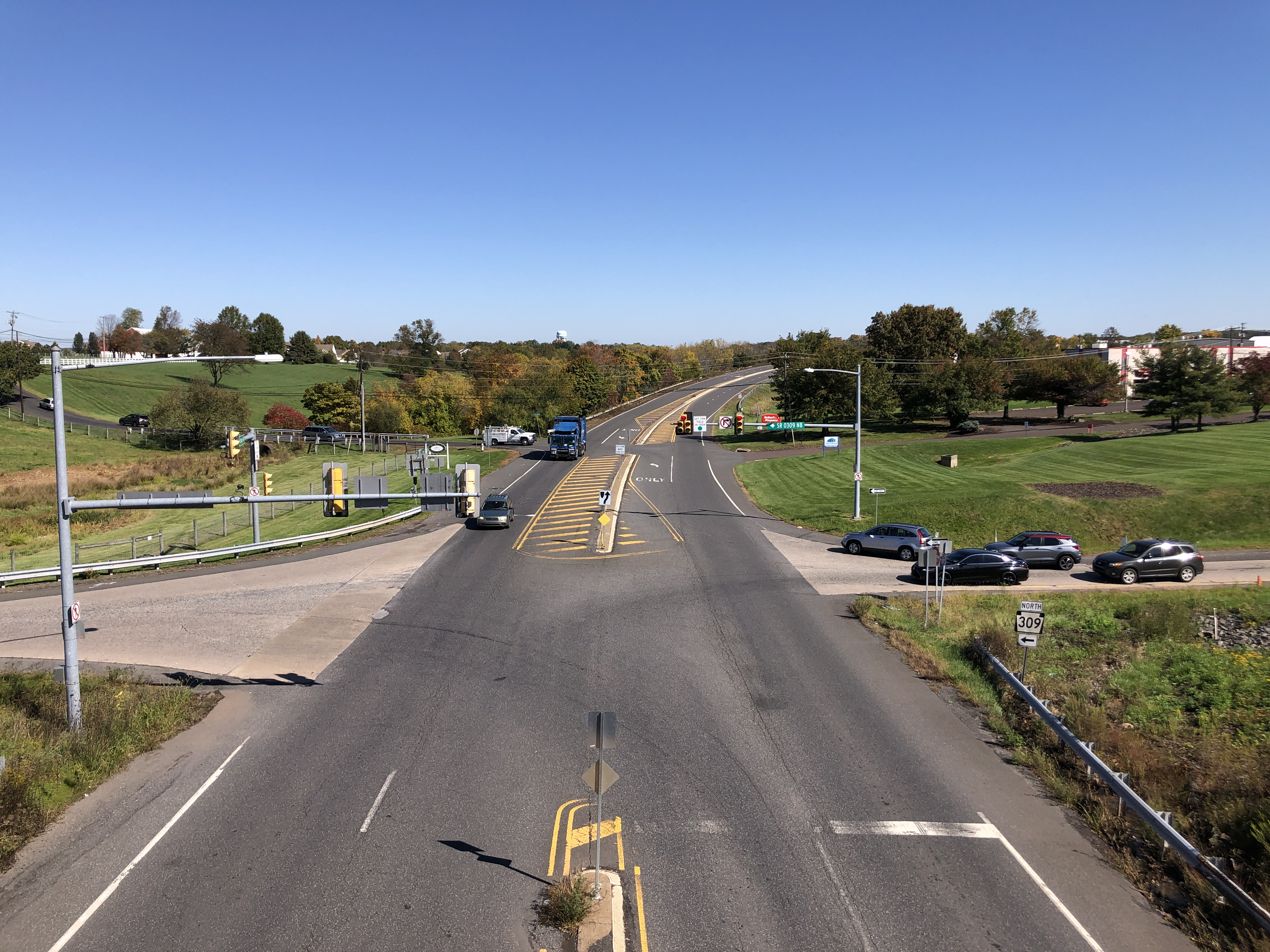
PA 152 southbound at its northern terminus at PA 309 in West Rockhill Township

PA 152 fully enters New Britain Township and becomes Limekiln Pike again, heading into a mix of agricultural and wooded areas with some homes and passing through the community of Newville. In Newville, the route intersects Creek Road and New Galena Road, both of which head northeast to provide access to Peace Valley Park. The road curves northwest and continues into Hilltown Township. At the intersection with Hilltown Pike, PA 152 turns northeast to remain along Limekiln Pike before turning northwest in the community of Hilltown. Following this, the route heads through the community of Mount Pleasant. Farther northwest, the road enters the borough of Silverdale and becomes Baringer Avenue, passing homes and coming to an intersection with PA 113 (Main Street).

At this point, PA 152 turns southwest to form a wrong-way concurrency with PA 113 on Main Street before splitting from that route by turning northwest onto Walnut Street. The route leaves Silverdale for Hilltown Township again and runs through areas of residential subdivisions. Farther northwest, the road enters the borough of Perkasie and continues past more residences and businesses. PA 152 turns southwest onto Constitution Avenue and passes a park before it crosses into the borough of Sellersville and becomes Park Avenue. PA 152 turns south onto Main Street and crosses into West Rockhill Township. PA 152 turns west onto four-lane undivided State Road before changing over to a divided highway as it comes to a bridge over the Bethlehem Line, a railroad line that is owned by SEPTA and operated by the East Penn Railroad. After the bridge, PA 152 crosses through a mix of fields and development before reaching its northern terminus at a diamond interchange with PA 309 (Sellersville Bypass). Past the northern terminus, State Road continues southwest as State Route 4035, an unsigned quadrant route, toward the borough of Telford.

== History ==
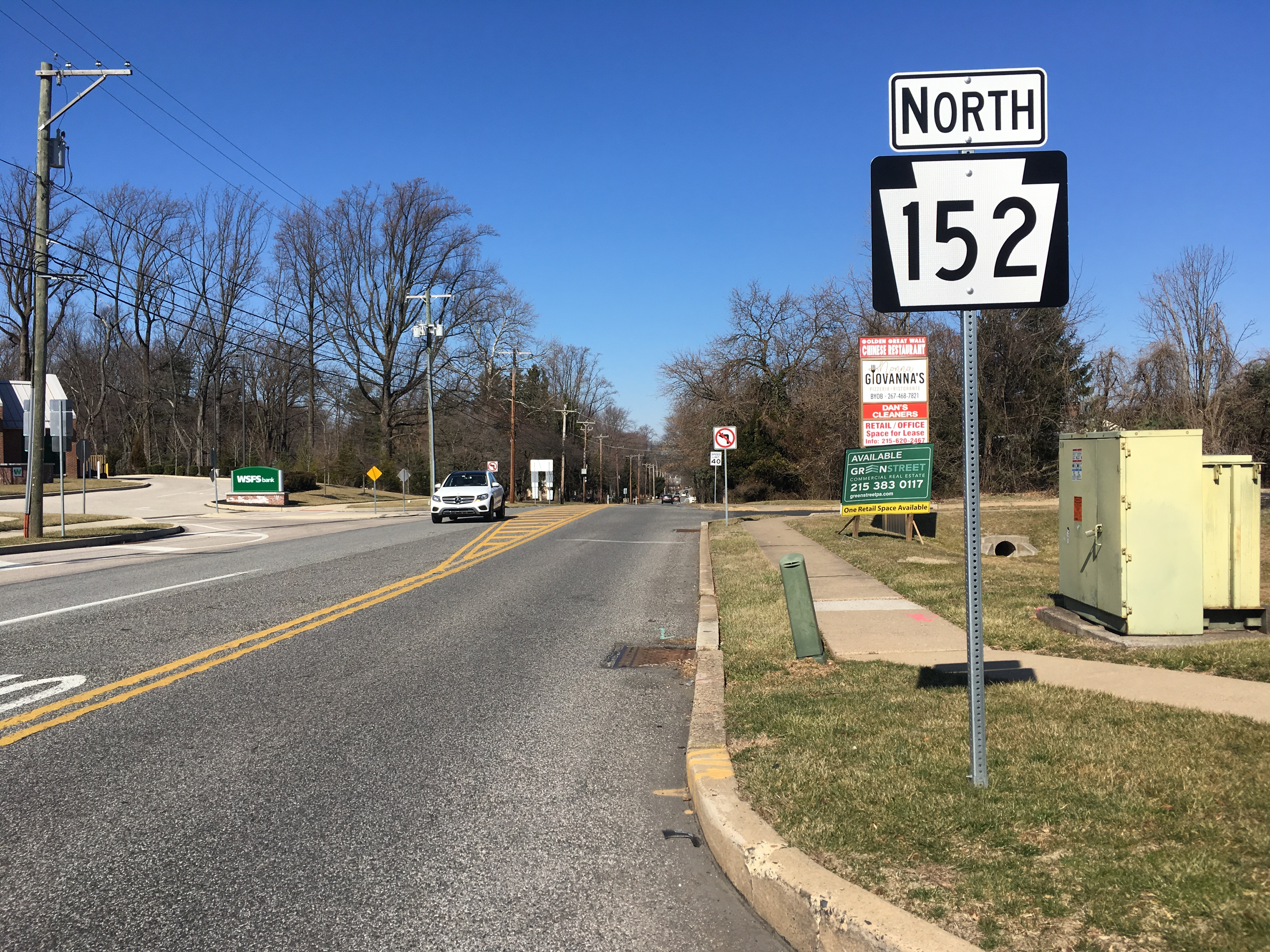
PA 152 northbound past PA 63 in Maple Glen

PA 152 was originally built as Limekiln Road in 1693. This road was used to transport lime from kilns in Upper Dublin Township. The road was maintained by adjacent property owners. In 1850, the Limekiln Turnpike Company was created to improve the roadway through the collection of tolls, boasting tollhouses at each end of the village of Dreshertown (now Dresher). The toll collection and tollhouses along the Limekiln Pike were abolished and removed in 1917. When Pennsylvania designated legislative routes in 1911, what is now PA 152 did not get a route number.

In the original 1928 routing, PA 152 stretched from the US 611 (Broad Street) and Stenton Avenue intersection via Stenton Avenue and Ogontz Avenue in the West Oak Lane neighborhood of North Philadelphia to PA 113 in Silverdale. At this time, the entire route south of Chalfont was paved. The segment within Perkasie and Sellersville known as Walnut Street, Constitution Avenue, and Park Avenue was signed as PA 413 from South Perkasie Road to Main Street (then US 309). By 1940, PA 152 was paved north of Chalfont.

In 1946, the northern terminus was moved to US 309 in Sellersville, replacing the segment of PA 413. From the late 1940s to before 1960, the southernmost segment on Easton Road from US 309 to Arcadia University was signed as US 611 Alternate. By 1960, the southern terminus was moved to its current location at US 309 (now PA 309) in Cheltenham Township, with US 309 replacing the route along Stenton Avenue and Ogontz Avenue. The northern terminus was moved to its current location at the PA 309 interchange near Sellersville by 1970.

== Major intersections ==
County	Location	mi	km	Destinations	Notes
Montgomery	Cheltenham Township	0.000	0.000	PA 309 (Fort Washington Expressway) – Philadelphia, Fort Washington	Interchange; southern terminus
Montgomery	Cheltenham Township	0.461	0.742	PA 73 (Church Road) – Whitemarsh, Cheltenham	
Montgomery	Upper Dublin–Horsham township line	6.997	11.261	PA 63 (Welsh Road) – Lansdale, Willow Grove	
Montgomery	Horsham Township	9.205	14.814	PA 463 (Horsham Road) – Hatfield, Hatboro	
Bucks	Warrington Township	13.129	21.129	US 202 – Norristown, Doylestown	
Bucks	Chalfont	14.509	23.350	US 202 Bus. south (Butler Avenue)	Southern end of US 202 Bus. concurrency
Bucks	Chalfont	14.668	23.606	US 202 Bus. north (Butler Avenue)	Northern end of US 202 Bus. concurrency
Bucks	Silverdale	20.699	33.312	PA 113 north (Main Street)	Southern end of PA 113 concurrency
Bucks	Silverdale	20.812	33.494	PA 113 south (Main Street)	Northern end of PA 113 concurrency
Bucks	West Rockhill Township	25.317	40.744	PA 309 (Sellersville Bypass)	Interchange; northern terminus
1.000 mi = 1.609 km; 1.000 km = 0.621 mi: Concurrency terminus; Electronic toll collection

== PA 152 Alternate Truck ==
=== Horsham ===
PA Route 152 Alternate Truck
- Location: Horsham Township
- Length: 4.6 mi (7.4 km)
- Existed: 2025–present

Pennsylvania Route 152 Alternate Truck is a truck route bypassing a weight-restricted bridge over Park Creek in Horsham Township, on which trucks over 30 tons and combination loads over 40 tons are prohibited. The route followed PA 463 and Norristown Road from Prospectville to Maple Glen in Montgomery County. The route was established in 2025.

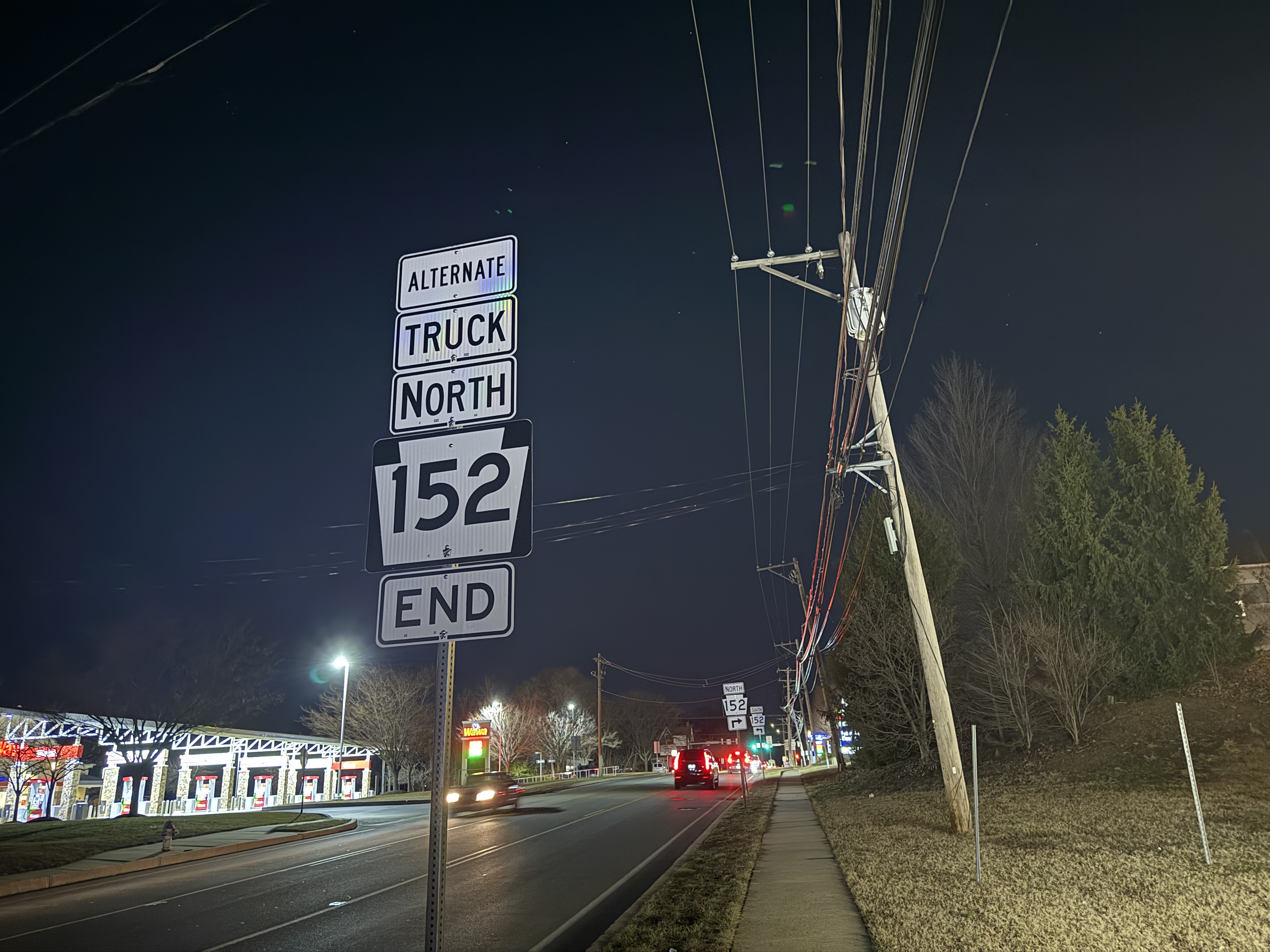
PA 152 Alternate Truck intersects PA 463 near Horsham for its northern terminus.

=== Cheltenham ===
PA Route 152 Alternate Truck
- Location: Montgomery County, Pennsylvania
- Length: 9.3 mi (15.0 km)
- Existed: 2019–2022

Pennsylvania Route 152 Alternate Truck was a truck route bypassing a weight-restricted bridge over SEPTA's Lansdale/Doylestown Line in Cheltenham Township, on which trucks over 15 tons and combination loads over 20 tons are prohibited. The route followed PA 309 and Norristown Road from Cheltenham to Maple Glen in Montgomery County. The route was established in 2019, but it was deleted in 2022 following a bridge repair.
