= U.S. Route 202 Business (Montgomeryville–Doylestown, Pennsylvania) =

Business route in Pennsylvania, United States

U.S. Route 202 Business

Route information
- Auxiliary route of US 202
- Maintained by PennDOT
- Length: 9.118 mi (14.674 km)
- Existed: 2015–present

Major junctions
- South end: US 202 near Montgomeryville
- PA 63 near Montgomeryville; PA 309 in Montgomeryville; PA 463 in Montgomeryville; PA 152 in Chalfont
- North end: PA 611 near Doylestown

Location
- Country: United States
- State: Pennsylvania
- Counties: Montgomery, Bucks

Highway system
- United States Numbered Highway System; List; Special; Divided; Pennsylvania State Route System; Interstate; US; State; Scenic; Legislative

U.S. Route 202 Business (US 202 Bus.) is a 10-mile (16 km) business route of US 202 in Montgomery and Bucks counties in the U.S. state of Pennsylvania, running between Montgomeryville and Doylestown. The route heads northeast from US 202 in Upper Gwynedd Township along five-lane Dekalb Pike through residential and commercial areas. In Montgomeryville, the route turns north to run concurrent with Pennsylvania Route 309 (PA 309) on five-lane Bethlehem Pike past several businesses. US 202 Bus. splits from PA 309 by turning northeast onto two-lane Doylestown Road. The route crosses into Bucks County and becomes Butler Avenue, passing through Chalfont and New Britain and curving east. West of Doylestown, the business route ends at an interchange with PA 611 in Doylestown Township.

The road between Montgomeryville and Doylestown was originally designated as US 122 in 1926, with PA 52 running concurrent for a short time in the late 1920s. US 202 replaced the US 122 designation in 1934. US 202 was moved to a freeway bypass of Doylestown in the 1970s, heading south from State Street on PA 611 before heading east on its own. In 2012, US 202 was moved to a newly built parkway running between Montgomeryville and Doylestown, leaving the former alignment without a signed route designation. As a result of the realignment of US 202, several businesses along the former alignment saw declines in customers. The businesses lobbied for the former alignment to be designated as US 202 Bus.; the designation was approved by the American Association of State Highway and Transportation Officials (AASHTO) in 2015.

== Route description ==
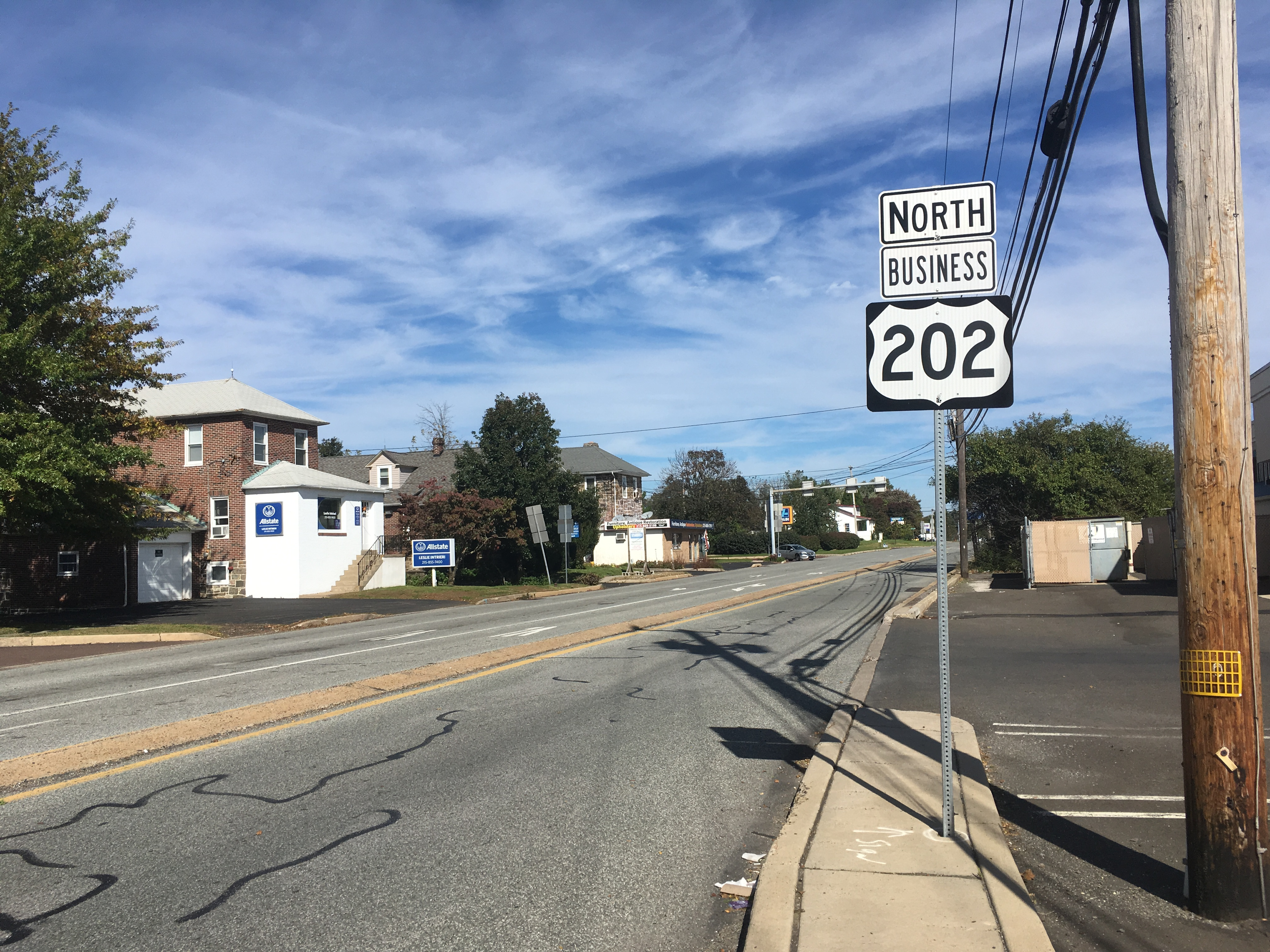
US 202 Bus. northbound past PA 309/PA 463 in Montgomeryville

US 202 Bus. begins at an intersection with US 202 in Upper Gwynedd Township, Montgomery County, heading north on Dekalb Pike, a five-lane road with a center left-turn lane. The road passes between fields to the west and businesses to the east, coming to an intersection with PA 63. Upon crossing PA 63, the route enters Montgomery Township in the North Penn Valley region and continues past commercial development before curving northeast and becoming a four-lane undivided road that passes residential subdivisions. US 202 Bus. passes between the Montgomery Mall to the northwest and businesses to the southeast, reaching a junction with PA 309 (Bethlehem Pike) in the community of Montgomery Square. At this point, US 202 Bus. turns northwest to form a concurrency with PA 309 on four-lane divided Bethlehem Pike, passing between the shopping mall to the west and the Airport Square shopping center to the east. The two routes head north past more businesses and become a five-lane road with a center left-turn lane past the North Wales Road intersection. PA 309/US 202 Bus. turns into a four-lane divided highway again and continues into the community of Montgomeryville. Here, the roadway comes to the Five Points intersection, where PA 463 crosses PA 309/US 202 Bus. and US 202 Bus. splits from PA 309 by heading northeast onto Doylestown Road. The route passes businesses as a two-lane divided road before gaining a center turn lane and running through wooded residential areas, heading to the southeast of a golf course and housing development. The road loses the turn lane and continues past homes before heading into business areas and coming to an intersection with County Line Road.

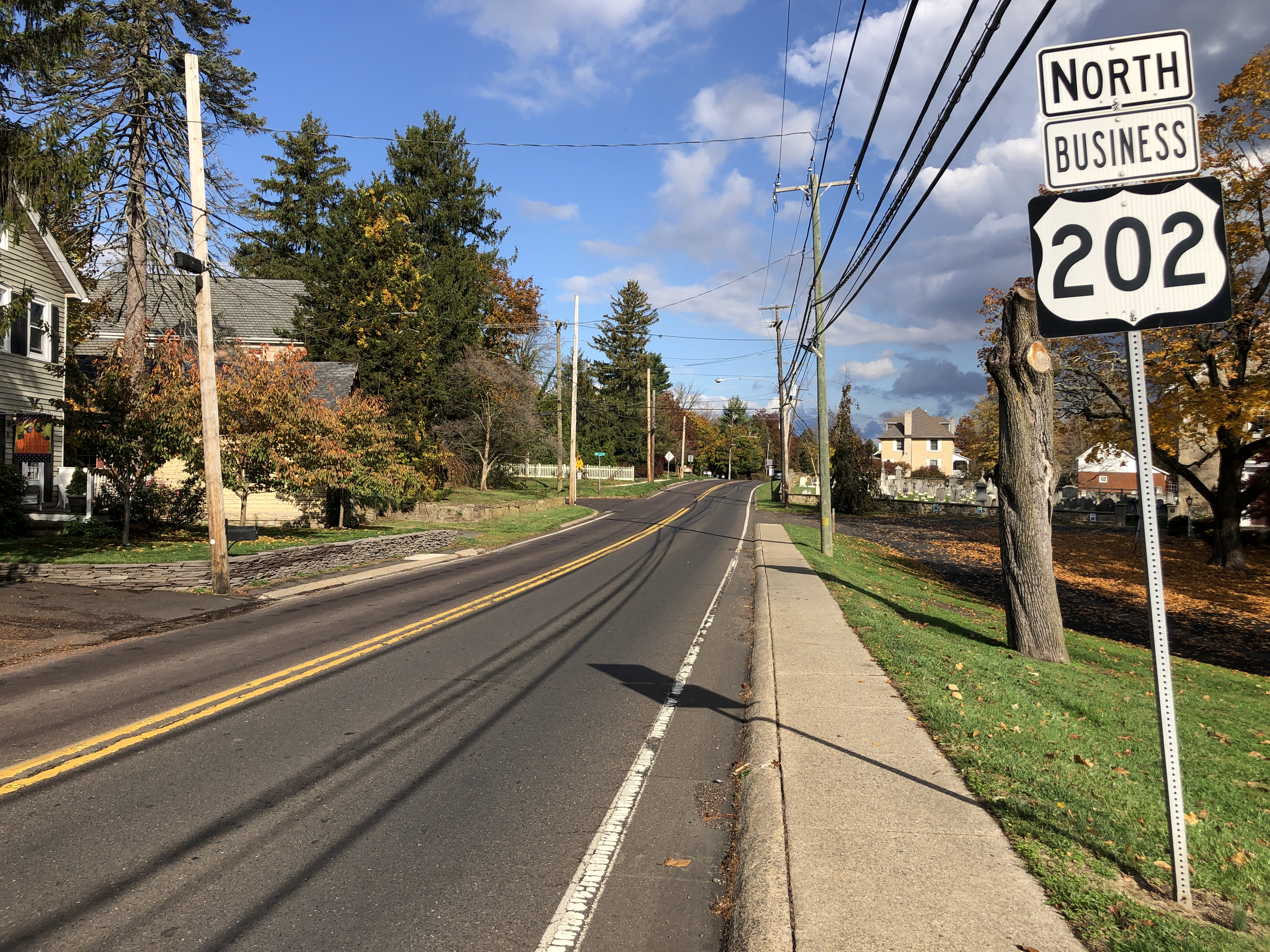
US 202 Bus. northbound in New Britain

Upon crossing County Line Road, US 202 Bus. leaves the North Penn Valley region and enters New Britain Township in Bucks County. Here, the route becomes West Butler Avenue, heading past businesses before running through a mix of residential and commercial development. The road crosses into the borough of Chalfont and passes through wooded areas of homes prior to reaching an intersection with PA 152. At this point, PA 152 joins US 202 Bus., with the road crossing the West Branch Neshaminy Creek and heading into a business district. PA 152 splits to the north and US 202 Bus. becomes East Butler Avenue, running past residences before crossing the North Branch Neshaminy Creek in a wooded area. The road passes businesses and intersects Bristol Road, at which point it enters the borough of New Britain and crosses SEPTA's Lansdale/Doylestown Line at-grade. The route follows West Butler Avenue past commercial development before running through wooded residential areas, becoming East Butler Avenue after crossing Tamenend Avenue. US 202 Bus. curves east and runs through more wooded areas of development, crossing Cooks Run and passing to the north of Delaware Valley University. The road enters Doylestown Township and becomes West State Street, curving northeast and widening to a four-lane divided highway. The route comes to an interchange with the PA 611 freeway bypass of the borough of Doylestown, at which point US 202 Bus. ends and West State Street continues into Doylestown as State Route 3002 (SR 3002), an unsigned quadrant route.

== History ==
When routes were first legislated in Pennsylvania in 1911, what is now US 202 Bus. was part of Legislative Route 178, which ran between Norristown and Buckingham. With the creation of the U.S. Highway System in 1926, the stretch of road between Montgomeryville and Doylestown became part of US 122, which was paved. PA 52 was designated concurrent with US 122 in 1928. By 1930, the concurrent PA 52 designation was removed from US 122. In 1934, US 122 was replaced with US 202. In addition, the stretch concurrent with US 309 (now PA 309) was widened into a multilane road in the 1930s.

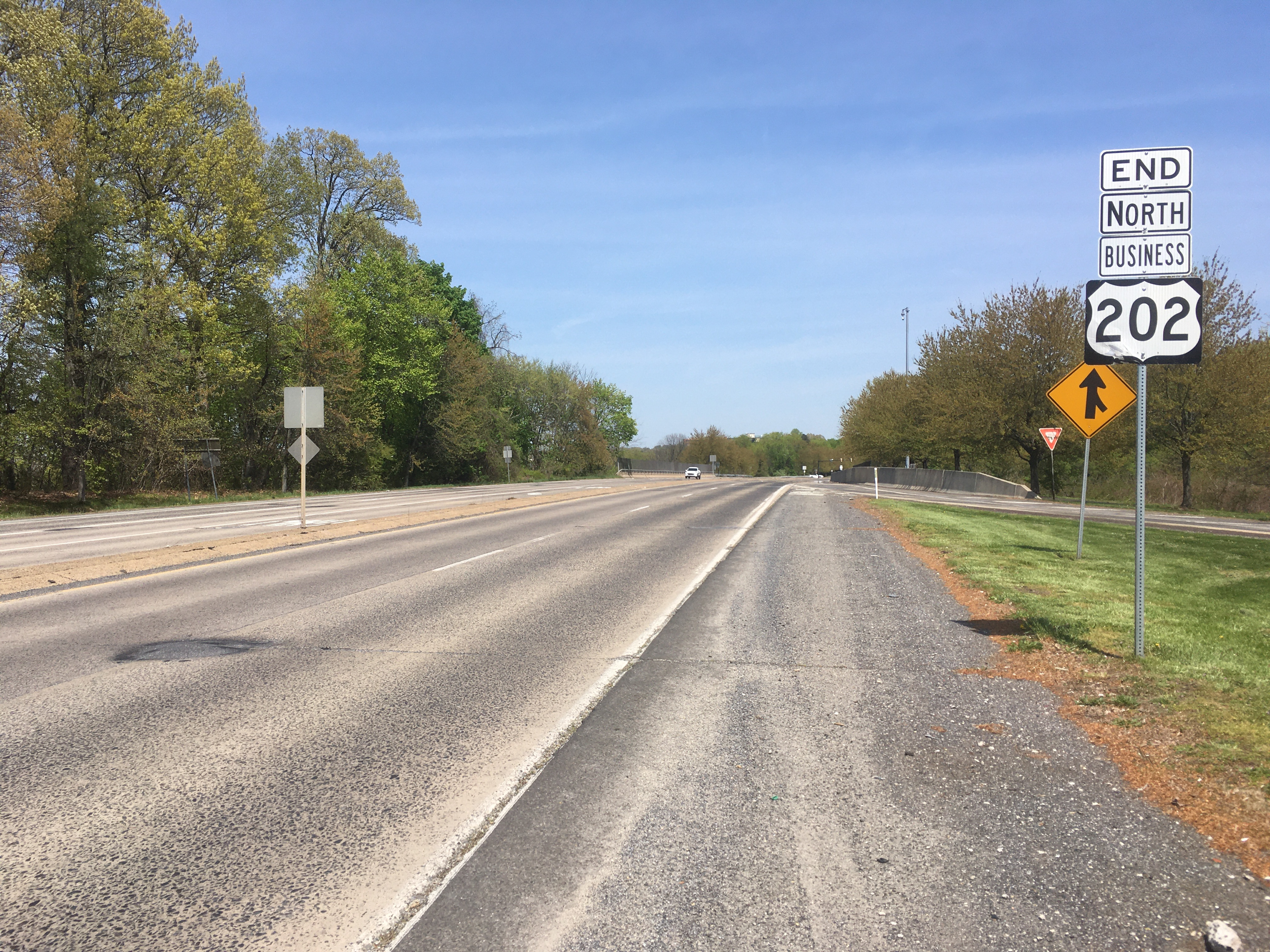
US 202 Bus. at its northern terminus at PA 611 in Doylestown Township

In the 1970s, US 202 was rerouted to a freeway bypass of Doylestown instead of passing through the borough on State Street, heading south with PA 611 before heading east on its own. On December 3, 2012, US 202 was realigned onto a newly constructed parkway between Montgomeryville and Doylestown. The US 202 parkway was built in order to reduce congestion on the former alignment between Montgomeryville and Doylestown. The former alignment was designated as SR 2202 in Montgomery County and SR 4202 in Bucks County. As a result of the removal of the US 202 designation from the former alignment, several businesses along the former route saw declines in customers. In 2014, several businesses along the former US 202 pushed for the state to designate the road as US 202 Bus. in order to help them gain customers. The AASHTO Special Committee on U.S. Route Numbering approved the US 202 Bus. designation on May 13, 2015.

== Major intersections ==
County	Location	mi	km	Destinations	Notes
Montgomery	Upper Gwynedd Township	0.000	0.000	US 202 (Dekalb Pike)	Southern terminus
Montgomery	Upper Gwynedd–Montgomery township line	0.226	0.364	PA 63 (Welsh Road) to US 202 north	
Montgomery	Montgomery Township	1.422	2.288	PA 309 south (Bethlehem Pike) – Philadelphia	South end of PA 309 overlap
Montgomery	Montgomery Township	2.299	3.700	PA 309 north (Bethlehem Pike) – Quakertown; PA 463 (Cowpath Road / Horsham Road) – Lansdale	North end of PA 309 overlap
Bucks	Chalfont	5.417	8.718	PA 152 south (Limekiln Pike)	South end of PA 152 overlap
Bucks	Chalfont	5.576	8.974	PA 152 north (Main Street)	North end of PA 152 overlap
Bucks	Doylestown Township	9.118	14.674	PA 611	Interchange; northern terminus
1.000 mi = 1.609 km; 1.000 km = 0.621 mi: Concurrency terminus
