= Jarrettown, Pennsylvania =

Unincorporated community in Pennsylvania, US

Jarrettown
- Unincorporated community
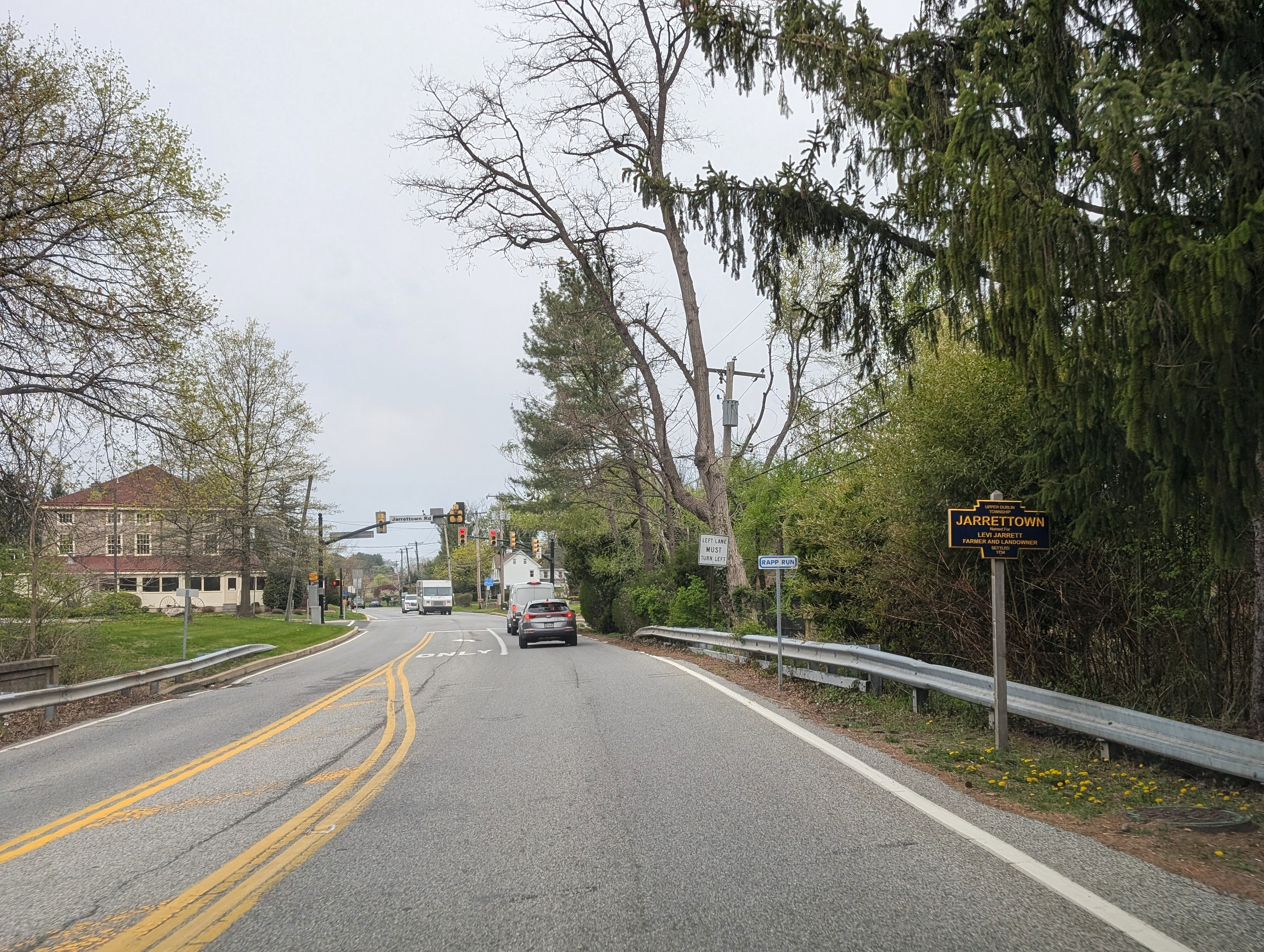
- PA 152 northbound entering Jarrettown

- Location of Jarrettown in Pennsylvania Jarrettown (the United States)
- Coordinates: 40°09′19″N 75°10′31″W
- Country: United States
- State: Pennsylvania
- County: Montgomery
- Township: Upper Dublin
- Elevation: 275.59 ft (84.00 m)
- Time zone: UTC-5 (EST)
  - Summer (DST): UTC-4 (EDT)
- Area codes: 215, 267 and 445

Jarrettown is an unincorporated community located in Montgomery County, Pennsylvania, United States. The community is in Upper Dublin Township, 2.2 miles (3.5 km) east of the Borough of Ambler and 2.75 miles (4.43 km) southwest of Horsham.

Jarrettown is located at the intersection of Pennsylvania Route 152 (Limekiln Pike) and Jarrettown Road, approximately 1 mile (1.6 km) north of Limekiln Pike's intersection with Susquehanna Road and 1.3 miles (2.1 km) southwest of Jarrettown Road's intersection with PA 63.

Bean's 1884 History of Montgomery County, Pennsylvania describes Jarrettown as follows:

Jarrettown is the second largest village [in Upper Dublin township], and is situated near the centre of the township, on the Limekiln turnpike, which was constructed in 1851. It contains a hotel, store, a three-story Odd-Fellows' Hall, two-story public school-house and twenty-one houses. The post-office was established here in 1866. Gordon in his "Gazetteer," mentions this place in 1832, as containing five or six dwellings. The name of the place was derived from Levi Jarrett, the owner of several farms in this vicinity in 1815. In 1776, John Jarrett was assessed for two hundred and thirteen acres. The name of Jarrett, like those of Fitzwater and Dresher, has now become extinct in Upper Dublin.
