= Bethlehem Pike =

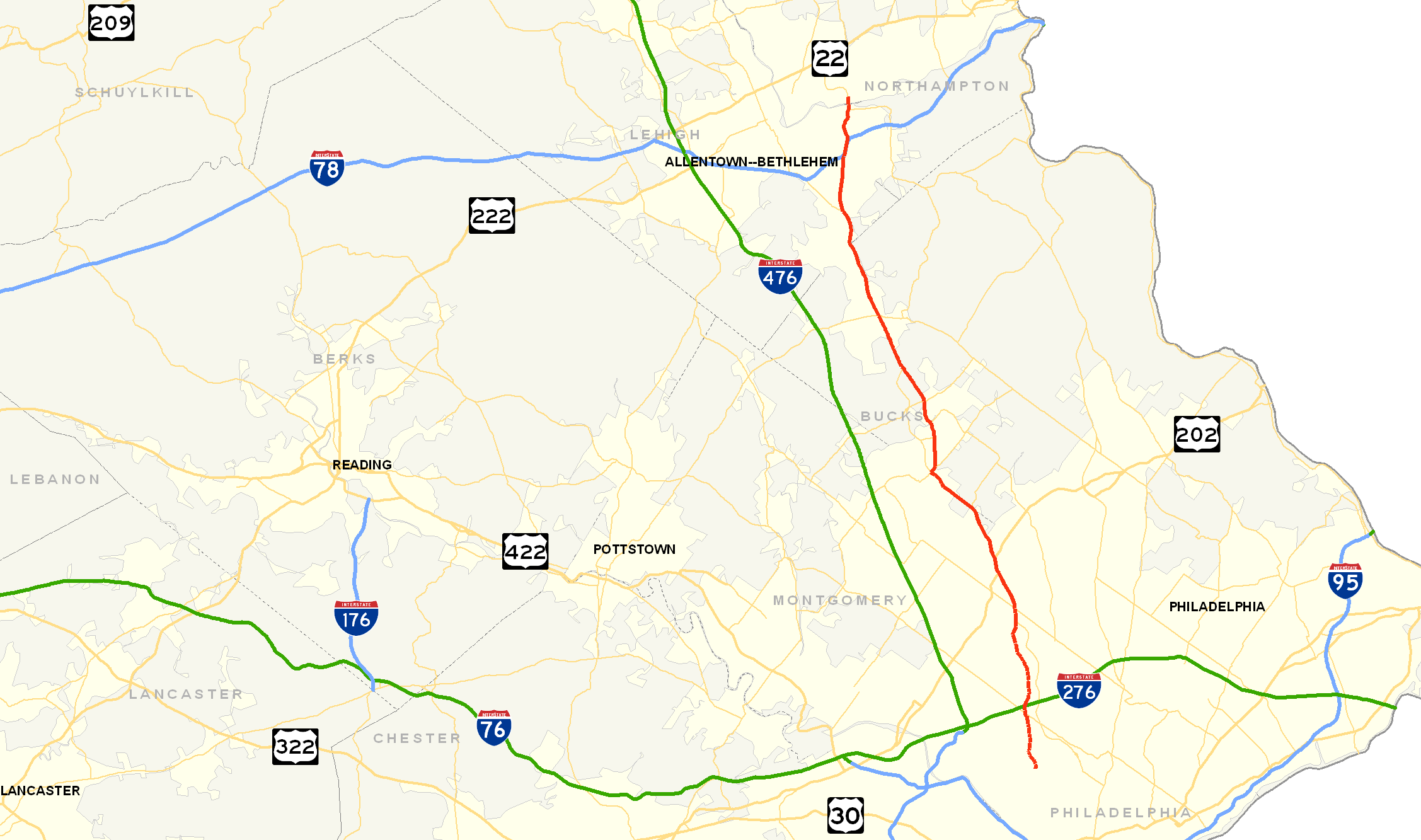

Route information
- Maintained by PennDOT
- Length: 42.21 mi (67.93 km) Length source data gathered using historical 19th Century USGS maps.
- Existed: 1763–present
- Component highways: PA 309 from near Fort Washington to Center Valley

Major junctions
- South end: Germantown Avenue in Philadelphia
- PA 309 near Fort Washington; US 202 in Montgomeryville; PA 313 / PA 663 in Quakertown; PA 309 in Center Valley
- North end: Main Street in Bethlehem

Location
- Country: United States
- State: Pennsylvania
- Counties: Bucks, Lehigh, Montgomery, Philadelphia

Highway system
- Pennsylvania State Route System; Interstate; US; State; Scenic; Legislative

Bethlehem Pike is a historic 42.21 mi (67.93 km) long road in the U.S. state of Pennsylvania that connects Philadelphia and Bethlehem, Pennsylvania. It began as a Native American path called the Minsi Trail which developed into a colonial highway called the King's Road in the 1760s. Most of the route later became part of U.S. Route 309, now Pennsylvania Route 309.

== History ==
The Bethlehem Pike originated from a Native American pathway known as the Minsi Trail. Named after the Minsi Indians, the trail was routed between the Blue Mountains and the lands to the south.

=== 18th century ===
In December 1740, David Nitschmann and his party went to Bethlehem and Nazareth along the trail. A year later, in 1741, a second party joined the first, traversing the same pathway.

Nicolaus Zinzendorf was included in the second party who visited the pioneers in the cabin along the banks of the Monocacy Creek. On Christmas Eve 1741, Zinzendorf celebrated a famous love-feast service, during which the new settlement was named Bethlehem.

After the founding of Bethlehem, a number of settlements began to rise along the route, causing a constant use of it and the highway to be called King's Road. The first trip made by George Klein was by stage wagon on September 10, 1763. He later made regular trips between Philadelphia and Bethlehem on a weekly basis. He started on Mondays from the Sun Inn in Bethlehem, and returned from the King of Prussia Inn in Philadelphia, on Thursdays. Bethlehem Pike and Germantown Avenue were the first two segments of the King's Highway, the main road carrying passengers and their goods between Philadelphia and the north.

In the northern regions of Philadelphia, the pike intersected the Old York Road. According to a legend, Tamanend, the great Indian chief, presented all lands within the young Germans' vision. Following the gift they received from the natives, they concluded the ritual, the sun rose, and the men named the spot Rising Sun. During the American Revolutionary War, British officers gathered near the southern terminus of the modern day pike. They gathered in the days their army faced the Continental Army at Whitemarsh. Further north along the route in the Whitemarsh Valley is the site where George Washington held Howe at bay, thus becoming famous in history as Church Hill. Before heading to Valley Forge, Washington and his army encamped here on December 11, 1777.

During the revolution, the pike dealt with a busy time period, for Bethlehem was crowded with officers, prisoners, and soldiers from the war. There was great excitement in Bethlehem on September 13, 1777, when the Patriot Army retreated from Philadelphia. Later, a letter had arrived by express courier from David Rittenhouse, announcing that all the military stores, in 700 wagons, were sent north on the Bethlehem Pike. Even the church and state bells were sent over for safekeeping on the pike.

In Quakertown, the wagon carrying the Liberty Bell broke down and the bell had to be unloaded on September 25, 1777. The wagon was repaired, and the bell was sent to Allentown, where it was hidden from the British on Hamilton Street.

The road traverses Rockhill Township, where the New Jersey and Pennsylvania armies listened to Richard Peters in 1799, a member of the Colonial assembly. They camped at Seller's Tavern in present-day Sellersville.

=== 19th century ===
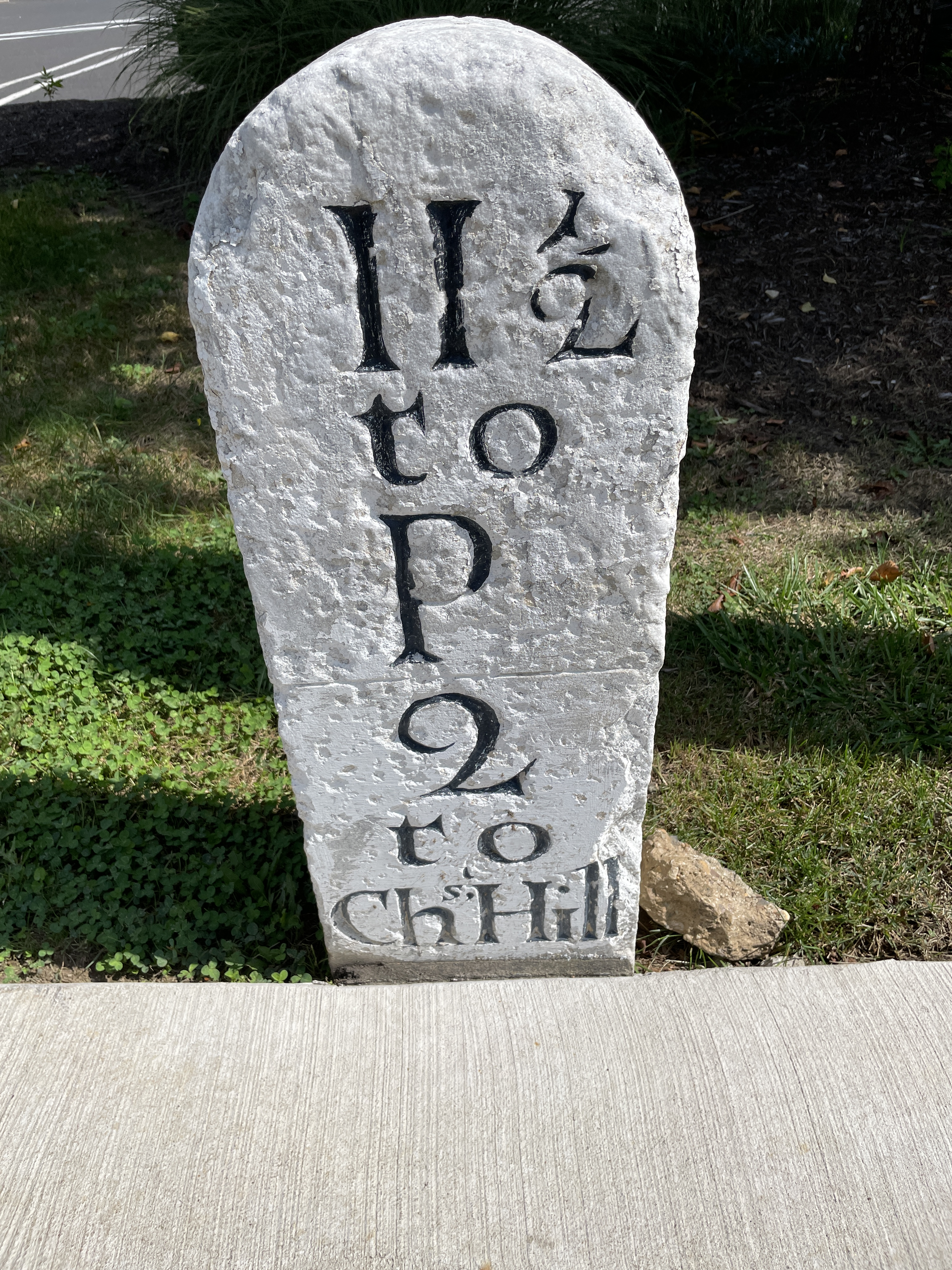
Milestone along the Bethlehem Pike in Flourtown

In 1804, the route became a toll road known as the Bethlehem Turnpike. Tolls were voluntary only during morning hours.

On March 11, 1834, Pennsylvania governor George Wolf signed a license authorizing the Bethlehem Turnpike Road Company to erect many of its gates. The turnpike was authorized to collect tolls from travelers on horses, cattle, and carriages.

=== 20th century ===
In 1910, the Bethlehem Pike became a free road after it was tolled for a century.

When Pennsylvania signed the Sproul Road Bill on May 31, 1911, the state began taking over the highways across the commonwealth. The bill defined the Bethlehem Pike as Legislative Route 297 (LR 297) in Northampton County and LR 153 in Lehigh County. The pike was defined as LR 153 through the counties of Bucks and Montgomery.

In 1926, when the U.S. Numbered Highway System was established, each designated trail in the United States was given a number and the majority of the Bethlehem Pike was signed as U.S. Route 309 (US 309).

During a three-decade period after the system was created, the pike was designated as Pennsylvania Route 12 (PA 12) from Bethlehem to Center Valley. South of Center Valley, the route was known as US 309. By 1960, a portion of the road was designated as Pennsylvania Route 191, when it replaced the entire routing of PA 12.

North of Philadelphia, US 309 was designated on the newly built Fort Washington Expressway, east of the original alignment on the Bethlehem Pike.

By 1970, US 309 was deleted and replaced by Pennsylvania Route 309. Following the commission of the route, PA 309 was moved to a newly constructed freeway, bypassing Sellersville, and west of the Bethlehem Pike.

Six years later, in 1976, Interstate 378 was deleted and PA 191 was truncated, and their former alignments were designated as Pennsylvania Route 378.

=== 21st century ===
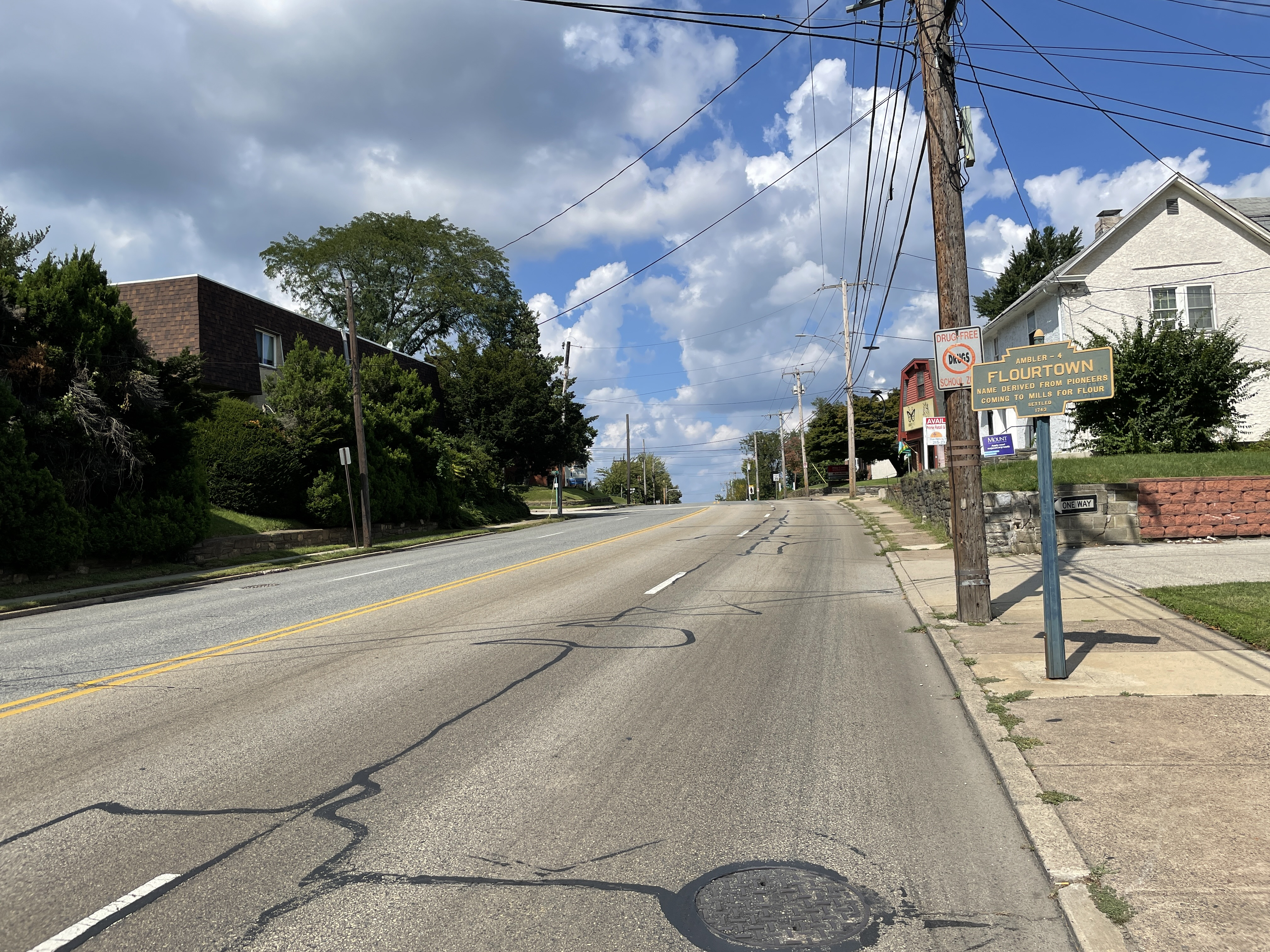
Bethlehem Pike northbound in Flourtown

In the 21st century, Bethlehem Pike is mostly designated as Pennsylvania Route 309 in the Lehigh and Delaware Valleys.

In Philadelphia, the road is signed as SR 4017, with a daily traffic of 15,000 vehicles.

The pike is routed as SR 2018 in Montgomery County, while parallel to PA 309. North of Fort Washington, the road is known as PA 309, with an average of 17,000 to 21,000 vehicles a day. In Sellersville, the pike is signed as SR 4013, south of PA 152, and SR 4085 north of PA 152.

From Quakertown to Center Valley, the pike has an old alignment west of the current designation on PA 309. In the Quakertown area, the PA 309 segment of the pike averages a daily traffic of 18,000 vehicles. North of Center Valley, the road is aligned as PA 378, Old Bethlehem Pike, and Old Philadelphia Pike, with an average traffic of 17,000 vehicles a day on PA 378. The northernmost segment of the pike is known as Main Street in Bethlehem.

Lower Gwynedd formed a project to improve the Bethlehem Pike within the township and estimated to cost $500,000.

== Major intersections ==
County	Location	mi	km	Destinations	Notes
Philadelphia	Philadelphia	0.00	0.00	Germantown Avenue	Formerly part of US 422
Montgomery	Whitemarsh Township	3.07	4.94	PA 73 east (Church Road)	Southern terminus of overlap
Montgomery	Whitemarsh Township	3.27	5.26	PA 73 west (East Skippack Pike) – Norristown	Northern terminus of overlap
Montgomery	Fort Washington	4.85	7.81	Pennsylvania Avenue to I-276 / Penna Turnpike	Formerly PA 731
Montgomery	Lower Gwynedd Township	8.98	14.45	PA 309 south (Fort Washington Expressway) – Philadelphia	Interchange; Bethlehem Pike becomes PA 309 north of this junction
Montgomery	Lower Gwynedd Township	9.38	15.10	PA 63 (Welsh Road)	
Montgomery	Montgomeryville			US 202 – Doylestown, Norristown	Interchange
Montgomery	Montgomeryville	11.58	18.64	US 202 Bus. south (Dekalb Pike) – Norristown	Southern terminus of overlap; former segment of US 122
Montgomery	Montgomeryville	12.47	20.07	PA 463 (Cowpath Road / Horsham Road) – Lansdale, Hatboro US 202 Bus. north (Doylestown Road) – Doylestown	Northern terminus of overlap; former segment of US 122
Bucks	Hilltown Township	18.60	29.93	PA 309 north (Sellersville Bypass)	Interchange; Bethlehem Pike becomes SR 4013 north of this junction
Bucks	Hilltown Township	18.89	30.40	PA 113 (Souderton Road)	
Bucks	Sellersville	20.51	33.01	PA 152 north (State Road) to PA 309 – Telford	Southern terminus of overlap
Bucks	Sellersville	21.36	34.38	PA 152 south (East Park Avenue)	Northern terminus of overlap; former segment of PA 413
Bucks	Sellersville	21.63	34.81	East Walnut Street	Formerly PA 813
Bucks	West Rockhill Township	22.71	36.55	PA 563 (Ridge Road)	
Bucks	West Rockhill Township	25.08	40.36	PA 309 south (Sellersville Bypass)	Interchange; Bethlehem Pike becomes PA 309 north of this junction
Bucks	Quakertown	28.07	45.17	PA 663 south (John Fries Highway) to Penna Turnpike NE Extension – Pennsburg PA 313 east (Broad Street) – Quakertown	Western terminus of PA 313; northern terminus of PA 663
Lehigh	Center Valley	34.41	55.38	PA 309 north – Allentown PA 378 begins	Bethlehem Pike becomes PA 378 north of this junction; southern terminus of PA 378; former segment of PA 312
Northampton	Bethlehem	40.07	64.49	PA 412 south (Broadway) – Hellertown	Northern terminus of PA 412; former segment of PA 43
Northampton	Bethlehem	40.43	65.07	PA 378 north / Main Street	Bethlehem Pike becomes Main Street north of this junction
Northampton	Bethlehem	41.12	66.18	Sun Inn Preservation on Main Street	
1.000 mi = 1.609 km; 1.000 km = 0.621 mi: Concurrency terminus
