= Prospectville, Pennsylvania =

Unincorporated community in Pennsylvania, US

- Unincorporated community
- Location within Pennsylvania Location within the United States
- Coordinates: 40°12′42″N 75°11′9″W
- Country: United States
- State: Pennsylvania
- County: Montgomery
- Township: Horsham
- Elevation: 351 ft (107 m)
- Time zone: UTC-5 (Eastern (EST))
  - Summer (DST): UTC-4 (EDT)
- ZIP code: 19002
- Area codes: 215, 267 and 445
- GNIS feature ID: 1184465

Prospectville is an unincorporated community on the northwestern end of Horsham Township, a home rule municipality of Montgomery County, Pennsylvania, United States. Prospectville is located at the intersection of state routes 152 and 463. It is located about 18 miles (29 km) north of the city center of Philadelphia and 89 miles (143 km) east of Pennsylvania's capital city of Harrisburg. It is 12 miles (19 km) northeast of Norristown, the county seat, and six miles (9.7 km) southeast of Lansdale, its shipping depot. It is located within the Hatboro-Horsham School District and is served by the Ambler post office within ZIP code 19002.

== History ==
Prospectville, established at the junction of Limekiln Pike and Horsham Road, was originally known as Cashtown. This portion of Limekiln Pike was an extension of the original segment established in 1693 to provide a thoroughfare between Old York Road and the lime kilns of Thomas Fitzwater in Upper Dublin Township. Prospectville, on a high elevation point within Horsham Township, offered a resting spot with a tavern for those traveling along either Limekiln Pike or Horsham Road. Here lived several generations of the Simpson family, one of whom was the mother of Ulysses S. Grant, the 18th President of the United States. Located within Prospectville is Graeme Park (pronounced GRAM), a 42-acre historic park, featuring the Keith House, the only surviving residence of a Colonial Pennsylvania Governor. The mansion has remained virtually intact since the late 18th century and it is the only National Historic Landmark within Horsham Township.
