= Sellersville, Pennsylvania =

Borough in Pennsylvania, US

- Borough
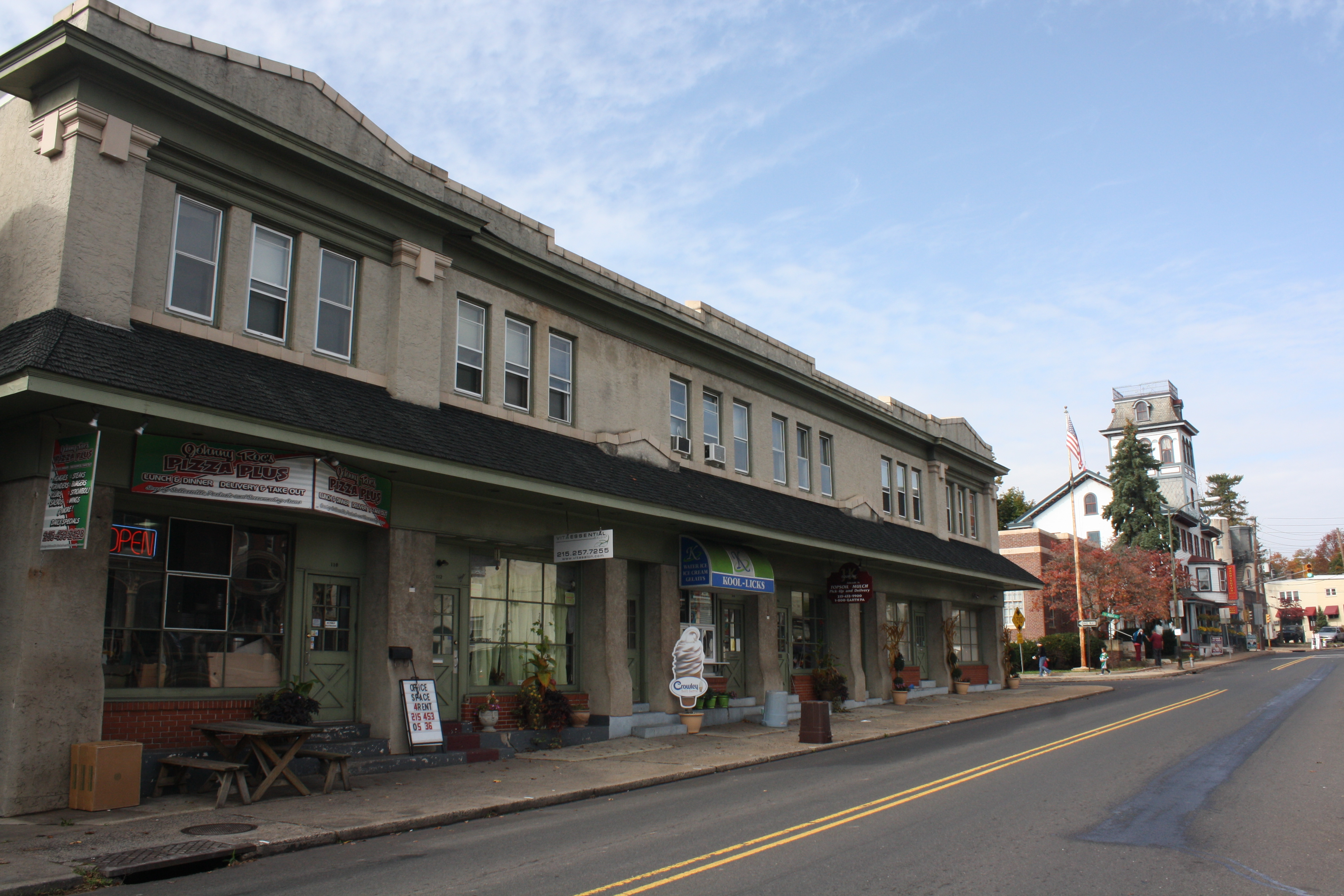
- Main Street

- Seal

- Location of Sellersville in Bucks County, Pennsylvania

- Location in Pennsylvania Location in the United States
- Coordinates: 40°21′31″N 75°18′36″W
- Country: United States
- State: Pennsylvania
- County: Bucks

Area
  - Total: 1.17 sq mi (3.03 km^{2})
  - Land: 1.14 sq mi (2.96 km^{2})
  - Water: 0.023 sq mi (0.06 km^{2})
- Elevation: 381 ft (116 m)

Population (2010)
  - Total: 4,249
  - Estimate (2019): 4,283
  - Density: 3,744.2/sq mi (1,445.66/km^{2})
- Time zone: UTC-5 (Eastern (EST))
  - Summer (DST): UTC-4 (EDT)
- Zip Code: 18960
- Area codes: 215, 267, and 445
- FIPS code: 42-69248
- Website: sellersvilleboro.org

Sellersville is a borough in Bucks County, Pennsylvania, United States. As of the 2020 census, Sellersville had a population of 4,567. It is in the Pennridge School District.

== History ==
=== 18th century ===
An aerial view of Sellersville in 1894

Sellersville was founded in the early 18th century. It was centered on a major road known as Bethlehem Pike that connected Philadelphia to Bethlehem and the rest of what was then Western Pennsylvania. The town was very small and was called Sellers Tavern. Its most notable feature was a large inn. The present Washington House in Sellersville, however, was not Sellers Tavern. The town grew slowly over the years until the Industrial Revolution.

=== 19th century ===
In the 1860s, the North Pennsylvania Railroad was built, running parallel to Bethlehem Pike: this stimulated the growth of light textile industries and brought a wave of population growth. The East Branch of the Perkiomen Creek runs through the town which connects it to an adjacent town of Perkasie. This creek was dammed in the early 20th century creating a small body of water known as Lake Lenape. Along the length of the lake a park was built on Perkasie and Sellersville lands. In the 1920s and 1930s this park housed a carousel, a roller coaster and several other amusements. The railroad brought hundreds of people from Philadelphia in the summer time, and it became a well known vacation spot for blue collar city workers.

=== 20th century ===
In August 1938, Deutschhorst Country Club, a summer retreat created by the German American Bund, a Pro-Nazi organization moved to the area after purchasing a 40-acre ranch outside of the town. The group used the area as a summer camp where family functions and activities were pursued in addition to political rallies. As World War II approached, the club sought to distance itself several times from the Nazi cause in local newspapers and was reported as "almost abandoned" from a lack of use by 1940. FBI agents were reported to have been watching the club grounds and visitors were reported to have covered their license plates in order to avoid being identified as a Bund member.

In September 1939, shortly after the start of World War II, the leader of German American Bund, Fritz Julius Kuhn, gave a speech to gathered members of the German American Bund and associated groups such as the World War I German Veteran league known as the Kyffhauser Bund, declaring that with the start of the war Adolf Hitler would "lick the world" in the new conflict. The camp would eventually be closed after the dissolution of the German American Bund on December 8, 1941, after the Japanese attack on Pearl Harbor.

The town was also home to the Radium Company of America, which was the largest uranium milling facility in the world at the time. A business operating under the name of the United States Gauge Company originated in Sellersville in 1904 and allegedly became a prominent manufacturer of gauges for military use, many of which were coated with radium-based paint for night-time luminescence. The company later became instrumental in the production of nuclear weapons, leaving behind a legacy of industrial and radioactive contamination that has been well-hidden by local, county, state, and federal government agencies for decades.

=== 21st century ===
In the 21st century, the town remains relatively small, sandwiched in between a ridge line and the larger town of Perkasie. The center of town still runs along Bethlehem Pike which is now called Old Route 309. The Washington House has recently been restored to become an upscale restaurant. Next door to the restaurant was a livery stable, which was converted into a theater and later into a movie theater in 1894. It has since been restored, and reopened in 2002 as Sellersville Theater 1894, a popular live music venue. The creek is still dammed but only the carousel in Perkasie remains of the amusements.

The textile industry has long moved out of the area and Sellersville has become mainly a residential town for people working in the many urban centers that are only a short commute away. Grand View Hospital, Bucks County’s first hospital, has provided residents of Bucks and Montgomery counties with comprehensive healthcare services since 1913. The town is surrounded on three sides by open country and spread out housing developments. The local firehouse provides various activities throughout the year, including a carnival in the summer. The Holiday House Pool and Recreation Center becomes a hotspot for people to escape the heat during the summer as well. There are various businesses along Main Street, one being the Washington House, which provide some jobs as well, but largely the town remains a residential area. Sellersville Museum is located off Main Street in Sellersville and displays different exhibits every month.

The Teller Cigar Factory was listed on the National Register of Historic Places in 1987.

== Geography ==
According to the U.S. Census Bureau, the borough has a total area of 1.2 square miles (3.1 km^{2}), of which 1.2 square miles (3.1 km^{2}) is land and 0.04 square miles (0.10 km^{2}) (1.69%) is water. It is located in Southeastern Pennsylvania as part of Northern Bucks County (colloquially referred to as Upper Bucks) which borders Northampton and Lehigh counties.

== Demographics ==
Historical population
Census	Pop.	Note	%±
1880	490		—
1890	794		62.0%
1900	1,247		57.1%
1910	1,572		26.1%
1920	1,739		10.6%
1930	2,063		18.6%
1940	2,115		2.5%
1950	2,373		12.2%
1960	2,497		5.2%
1970	2,829		13.3%
1980	3,143		11.1%
1990	4,479		42.5%
2000	4,564		1.9%
2010	4,249		−6.9%
2020	4,567		7.5%

=== 2020 census ===
As of the 2020 census, Sellersville had a population of 4,567. The median age was 38.8 years. 21.3% of residents were under the age of 18 and 13.2% of residents were 65 years of age or older. For every 100 females there were 98.6 males, and for every 100 females age 18 and over there were 96.0 males age 18 and over.

100.0% of residents lived in urban areas, while 0.0% lived in rural areas.

There were 1,911 households in Sellersville, of which 28.3% had children under the age of 18 living in them. Of all households, 42.8% were married-couple households, 20.5% were households with a male householder and no spouse or partner present, and 29.6% were households with a female householder and no spouse or partner present. About 30.3% of all households were made up of individuals and 9.5% had someone living alone who was 65 years of age or older.

There were 1,976 housing units, of which 3.3% were vacant. The homeowner vacancy rate was 0.8% and the rental vacancy rate was 4.7%.

Racial composition as of the 2020 census
Race	Number	Percent
White	3,953	86.6%
Black or African American	144	3.2%
American Indian and Alaska Native	15	0.3%
Asian	70	1.5%
Native Hawaiian and Other Pacific Islander	3	0.1%
Some other race	80	1.8%
Two or more races	302	6.6%
Hispanic or Latino (of any race)	257	5.6%

=== 2010 census ===
As of the census of 2010, there were 4,249 people living in the borough. The racial makeup of the borough was 93.6% White, 1.8% African American, 0.3% Native American, 1.0% Asian, 0.0% Pacific Islander, 1.0% from other races, and 2.3% from two or more races. Hispanic or Latino of any race were 3.4% of the population.

=== 2000 census ===
As of the census of 2000, there were 4,564 people, 1,770 households, and 1,198 families living in the borough. The population density was 3,934.1 inhabitants per square mile (1,519.0/km^{2}). There were 1,827 housing units at an average density of 1,574.8 per square mile (608.0/km^{2}). The racial makeup of the borough was 97.30% White, 0.57% African American, 0.15% Native American, 0.35% Asian, 0.04% Pacific Islander, 0.48% from other races, and 1.10% from two or more races. Hispanic or Latino of any race were 1.99% of the population.

There were 1,770 households, out of which 36.8% had children under the age of 18 living with them, 53.1% were married couples living together, 11.0% had a female householder with no husband present, and 32.3% were non-families. 26.5% of all households were made up of individuals, and 5.9% had someone living alone who was 65 years of age or older. The average household size was 2.56 and the average family size was 3.13.

In the borough the population was spread out, with 27.6% under the age of 18, 8.2% from 18 to 24, 36.9% from 25 to 44, 19.1% from 45 to 64, and 8.2% who were 65 years of age or older. The median age was 34 years. For every 100 females there were 101.1 males. For every 100 females age 18 and over, there were 95.9 males.

The median income for a household in the borough was $46,500, and the median income for a family was $55,313. Males had a median income of $38,018 versus $27,056 for females. The per capita income for the borough was $19,970. About 5.4% of families and 5.2% of the population were below the poverty line, including 6.5% of those under age 18 and 5.6% of those age 65 or over.

== Infrastructure ==
=== Transportation ===
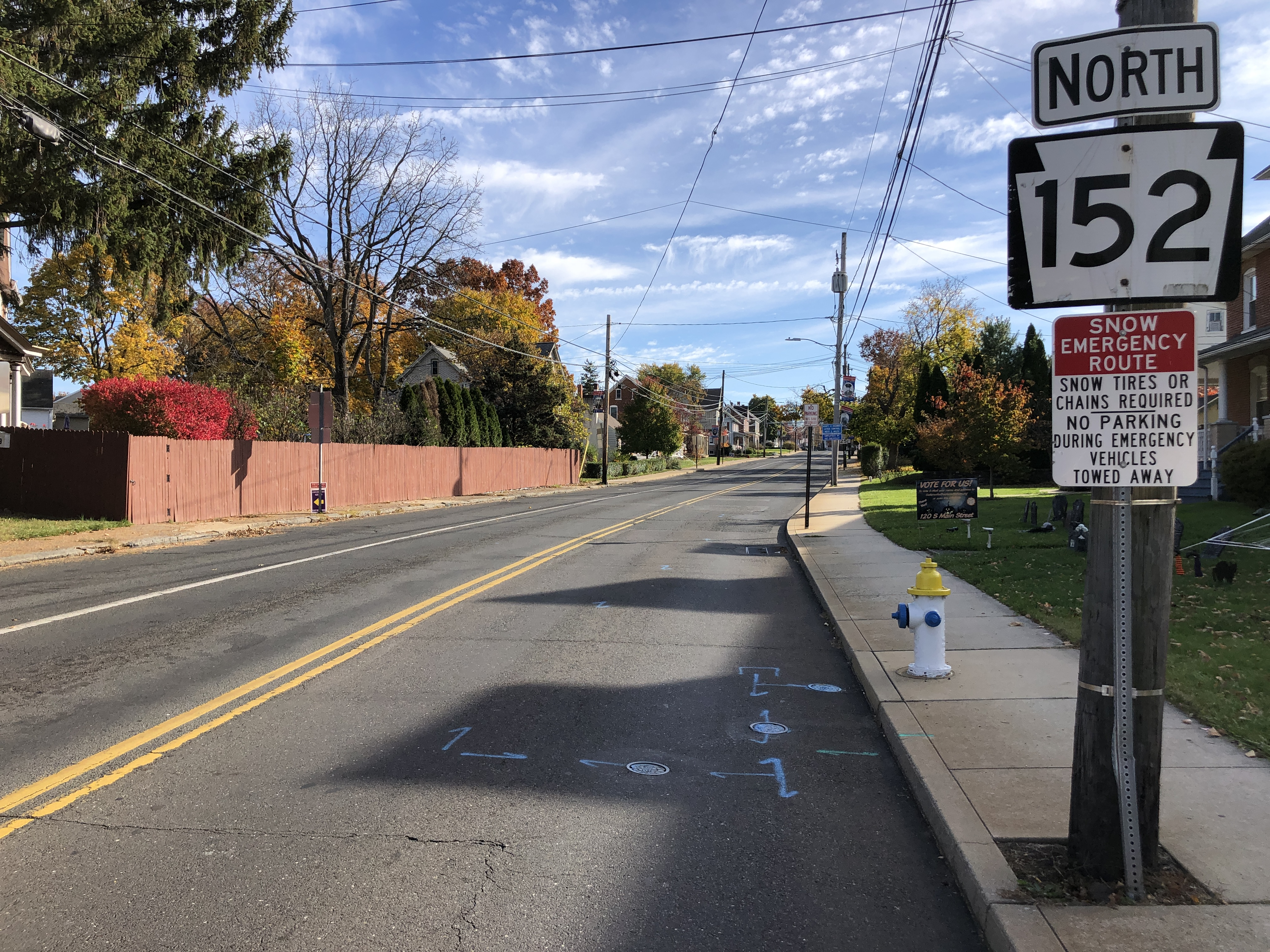
PA 152 northbound in Sellersville

As of 2020 there were 13.33 miles (21.45 km) of public roads in Sellersville, of which 3.68 miles (5.92 km) were maintained by the Pennsylvania Department of Transportation (PennDOT) and 9.65 miles (15.53 km) were maintained by the borough.

Main Street serves as the main north-south road through Sellersville, becoming Bethlehem Pike to the north and south. Pennsylvania Route 152 passes through Sellersville southwest-northeast along Main Street and Park Avenue, heading northeast into Perkasie. Pennsylvania Route 309 bypasses Sellersville to the west along a freeway, with interchanges at PA 152 and Lawn Avenue providing access to Sellersville. Pennsylvania Route 563 passes east-west to the north of Sellersville.

There is currently no public transportation in Sellersville. Sellersville was once served by SEPTA's Bethlehem Line which provided passenger service north to Quakertown and Bethlehem and south to Philadelphia, but service ended in 1981. Restoration of train service to Quakertown has been proposed. The East Penn Railroad operates freight service through Sellersville along a branch from Telford to Quakertown along the former SEPTA tracks. Sellersville station currently serves as borough offices.

=== Utilities ===
PPL Corporation in Allentown provides electricity to Sellersville. Natural gas service in Sellersville is provided by UGI Utilities. The North Penn Water Authority provides water to Sellersville, having taken over the borough's water system in 2011. The borough provides sewer service, with sewage treated at the Pennridge Waste Water Treatment plant. Trash and recycling collection in Sellersville is provided under contract by Republic Services. Cable and internet service in Sellersville is provided by Verizon, Frontier Communications, and Xfinity.

=== Health care ===
Grand View Health operates Grand View Hospital outside Sellersville, serving northern Bucks County. The hospital offers various services including an emergency room, Cancer Care, Orthopaedics, Pediatrics, Surgery, and Women's Health.

== Climate ==
According to the Köppen climate classification system, Sellersville has a Hot-summer, Humid continental climate (Dfa). Dfa climates are characterized by at least one month having an average mean temperature ≤ 32.0 °F (0.0 °C), at least four months with an average mean temperature ≥ 50.0 °F (10.0 °C), at least one month with an average mean temperature ≥ 71.6 °F (22.0 °C) and no significant precipitation difference between seasons. Although most summer days are slightly humid in Sellersville, episodes of heat and high humidity can occur with heat index values > 106 °F (41 °C). Since 1981, the highest air temperature was 101.5 °F (38.6 °C) on 07/22/2011, and the highest daily average mean dew point was 74.3 °F (23.5 °C) on 08/12/2016. The average wettest month is July which corresponds with the annual peak in thunderstorm activity. Since 1981, the wettest calendar day was 6.86 inches (174 mm) on 08/27/2011. During the winter months, the average annual extreme minimum air temperature is −1.0 °F (−18.3 °C). Since 1981, the coldest air temperature was −12.9 °F (−24.9 °C) on 01/22/1984. Episodes of extreme cold and wind can occur with wind chill values < −12 °F (−24 °C). The average annual snowfall (Nov-Apr) is between 30 inches (76 cm) and 36 inches (91 cm). Ice storms and large snowstorms depositing ≥ 12 inches (30 cm) of snow occur once every few years, particularly during nor’easters from December through February.

Climate data for Sellersville, Elevation 328 ft (100 m), 1981-2010 normals, extremes 1981-2018
Month	Jan	Feb	Mar	Apr	May	Jun	Jul	Aug	Sep	Oct	Nov	Dec	Year
Record high °F (°C)	70.3 (21.3)	77.8 (25.4)	85.9 (29.9)	92.7 (33.7)	94.1 (34.5)	95.3 (35.2)	101.5 (38.6)	99.2 (37.3)	96.8 (36.0)	88.1 (31.2)	80.0 (26.7)	74.8 (23.8)	101.5 (38.6)
Mean daily maximum °F (°C)	38.6 (3.7)	42.0 (5.6)	50.4 (10.2)	62.6 (17.0)	72.7 (22.6)	81.3 (27.4)	85.3 (29.6)	83.7 (28.7)	76.9 (24.9)	65.3 (18.5)	54.2 (12.3)	42.8 (6.0)	63.1 (17.3)
Daily mean °F (°C)	30.1 (−1.1)	32.8 (0.4)	40.4 (4.7)	51.3 (10.7)	61.2 (16.2)	70.2 (21.2)	74.6 (23.7)	73.1 (22.8)	65.7 (18.7)	54.0 (12.2)	44.3 (6.8)	34.4 (1.3)	52.8 (11.6)
Mean daily minimum °F (°C)	21.5 (−5.8)	23.6 (−4.7)	30.5 (−0.8)	40.1 (4.5)	49.6 (9.8)	59.1 (15.1)	64.0 (17.8)	62.4 (16.9)	54.5 (12.5)	42.7 (5.9)	34.4 (1.3)	26.1 (−3.3)	42.5 (5.8)
Record low °F (°C)	−12.9 (−24.9)	−5.3 (−20.7)	1.6 (−16.9)	16.5 (−8.6)	29.9 (−1.2)	40.2 (4.6)	46.7 (8.2)	41.4 (5.2)	34.2 (1.2)	23.0 (−5.0)	10.2 (−12.1)	−2.6 (−19.2)	−12.9 (−24.9)
Average precipitation inches (mm)	3.44 (87)	2.84 (72)	3.89 (99)	4.09 (104)	4.34 (110)	4.38 (111)	4.75 (121)	3.89 (99)	4.55 (116)	4.31 (109)	3.72 (94)	3.96 (101)	48.16 (1,223)
Average relative humidity (%)	67.4	64.4	60.0	58.6	62.5	67.9	68.4	70.7	71.7	70.7	69.4	69.6	66.8
Average dew point °F (°C)	20.6 (−6.3)	22.1 (−5.5)	27.6 (−2.4)	37.3 (2.9)	48.3 (9.1)	59.1 (15.1)	63.5 (17.5)	63.0 (17.2)	56.3 (13.5)	44.7 (7.1)	34.9 (1.6)	25.5 (−3.6)	42.0 (5.6)
Source: PRISM

== Ecology ==
According to the A. W. Kuchler U.S. potential natural vegetation types, Sellersville would have a dominant vegetation type of Appalachian Oak (104) with a dominant vegetation form of Eastern Hardwood Forest (25). The plant hardiness zone is 6b with an average annual extreme minimum air temperature of −1.0 °F (−18.3 °C). The spring bloom typically begins by April 11 and fall color usually peaks by October 29.

== Education ==
It is in the Pennridge School District.

== Notable people ==
- Walter Emerson Baum, Pennsylvania impressionist painter and art educator
- Kyle Blanks, former professional baseball player, Oakland Athletics, San Diego Padres, and Texas Rangers
- Chris Collingwood, co-founder of the power pop band Fountains of Wayne
- Amie Harwick, author and therapist
- Jamie Moyer, former professional baseball player, Philadelphia Phillies and other teams
- Marissa Sheva, National Women's Soccer League and Republic of Ireland national team player
- Henry Delp Styer, US Army brigadier general
- Jon Wurster, drummer and comedy writer
