= Cedarbrook, Pennsylvania =

Unincorporated community in Pennsylvania, US

Cedarbrook
- Unincorporated community Neighborhood of Cheltenham Township
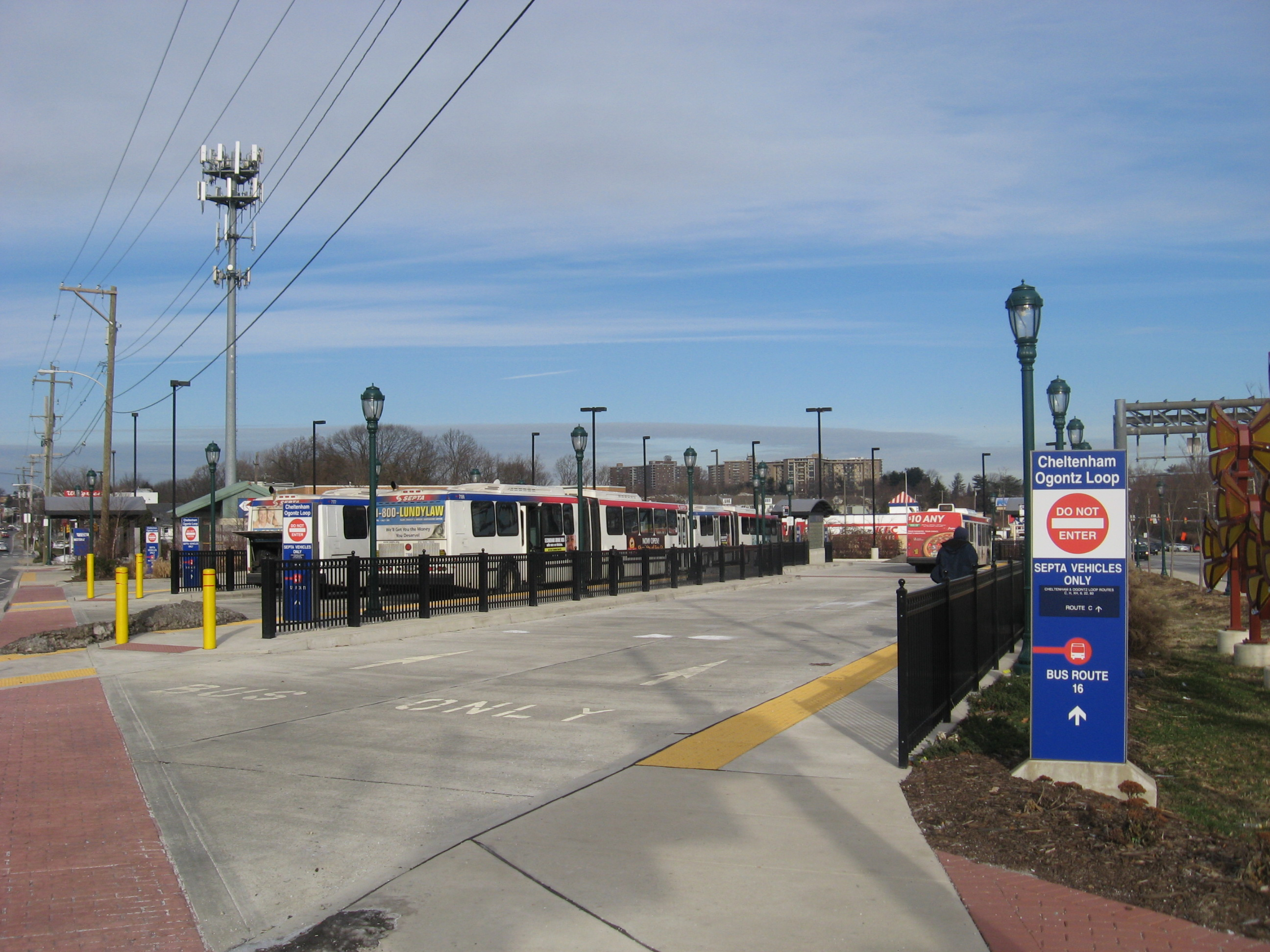
- Looking north on 309 towards Cedarbrook from Cheltenham Avenue. In the foreground in the Cheltenham-Ogontz Bus Terminal, and in the background are the Towers at Wyncote.

- Location of Cedarbrook in Pennsylvania Cedarbrook (the United States)
- Coordinates: 40°4′59″N 75°9′36″W
- Country: United States
- State: Pennsylvania
- County: Montgomery
- Township: Cheltenham
- Elevation: 361 ft (110 m)
- Time zone: UTC-5 (EST)
  - Summer (DST): UTC-4 (EDT)
- Area codes: 215, 267 and 445

Cedarbrook is an unincorporated community in Cheltenham Township in Montgomery County, Pennsylvania, United States. Cedarbrook is located at the intersection of Pennsylvania Route 309 and Greenwood Avenue, just over the city line of Philadelphia. Cedarbrook is home to the Cedarbrook Shopping Center, a major shopping attraction for many Cheltenham Township and North Philadelphia shoppers.
