= Pennsylvania Route 22 =

Pennsylvania Route 22 may refer to:

- U.S. Route 22 in Pennsylvania
- Pennsylvania Route 22 (1920s)
