= Bowman Creek, Pennsylvania =

- Unincorporated community
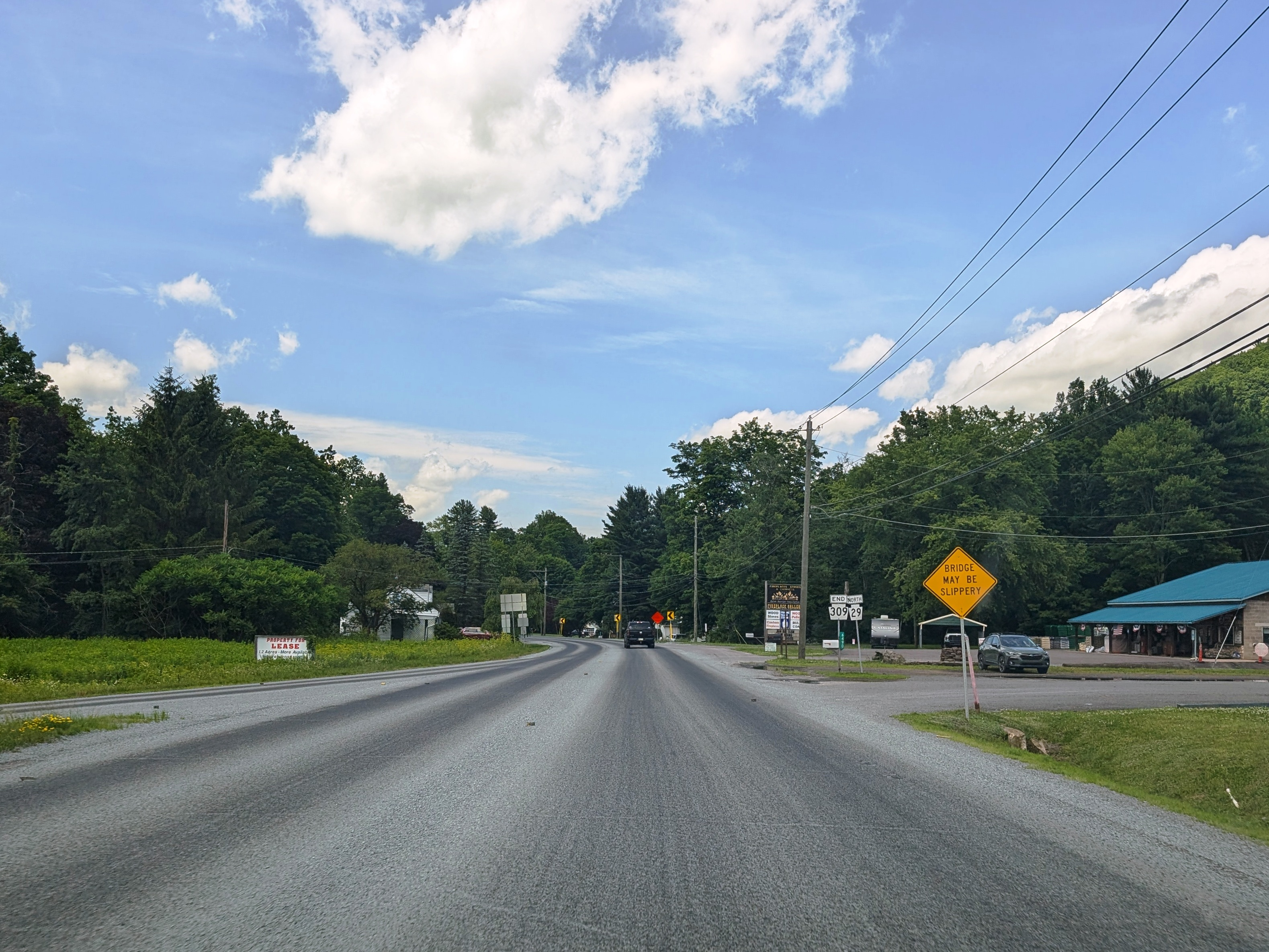
- PA 309 at PA 29

- Location within Pennsylvania Location within the United States
- Coordinates: 41°25′47″N 76°01′10″W
- Country: United States
- State: Pennsylvania
- County: Wyoming
- Township: Monroe
- Elevation: 876 ft (267 m)
- Time zone: UTC-5 (Eastern (EST))
  - Summer (DST): UTC-4 (EDT)
- Area code: 570
- GNIS feature ID: 1203131

Bowman Creek is an unincorporated community in Monroe Township in Wyoming County, Pennsylvania. Bowman Creek is located at the intersection of state routes 29 and 309, south of Tunkhannock.
