= Pennsylvania Route 309 =

State highway in Pennsylvania, US

Pennsylvania Route 309
- PA 309 in red, PA 309 Bus., and PA 309 Truck in blue

Route information
- Maintained by PennDOT
- Length: 134.043 mi (215.721 km)
- Existed: February 1968–present

Major junctions
- South end: PA 611 / Cheltenham Avenue at the Philadelphia–Cheltenham Township line
- I-276 Toll / Penna Turnpike in Fort Washington; US 202 in Montgomeryville; I-78 / PA 145 near Allentown; US 222 / PA 222 near Allentown; US 22 near Allentown; US 209 in Tamaqua; I-81 near McAdoo; I-80 in Butler Township; I-81 near Wilkes-Barre; US 11 in Kingston
- North end: PA 29 in Monroe Township

Location
- Country: United States
- State: Pennsylvania
- Counties: Philadelphia, Montgomery, Bucks, Lehigh, Schuylkill, Carbon, Luzerne, Wyoming

Highway system
- Pennsylvania State Route System; Interstate; US; State; Scenic; Legislative
← PA 308	→ PA 310
← US 22	→ PA 23

Pennsylvania Route 309 (PA 309) is a state highway that runs for 134 miles (216 km) through eastern Pennsylvania. The route runs from an interchange between PA 611 and Cheltenham Avenue on the border of Philadelphia and Cheltenham Township north to an intersection with PA 29 in Bowman Creek, a village in Monroe Township in Wyoming County. The highway connects Philadelphia and its northern suburbs to Allentown and the Lehigh Valley, and Hazleton and Wilkes-Barre in Wyoming Valley.

PA 309 heads north from Philadelphia and becomes a freeway called Fort Washington Expressway through suburban areas in Montgomery County, passing through Fort Washington, before becoming a surface road called Bethlehem Pike and running through Montgomeryville. In Bucks County, the route has a freeway section bypassing Sellersville before passing through Quakertown as a surface road. PA 309 then enters the Lehigh Valley, where it joins Interstate 78 (I-78) on a freeway bypassing Allentown to the south before splitting to the north and running through rural areas as a surface road. The route continues north into the Coal Region, passing through Tamaqua before it reaches Hazleton. PA 309 heads into Wyoming Valley and passes through the Wilkes-Barre area on a freeway alignment along I-81 and the North Cross Valley Expressway before turning into a surface road again, where it runs through Dallas before reaching its northern terminus.

The surface road sections of the route between Philadelphia and the Lehigh Valley follow a turnpike called Bethlehem Pike that was built in the 1800s. With the creation of the U.S. Highway System in 1926, U.S. Route 309 (US 309) was designated to run from US 120 (later renamed US 422) in the Chestnut Hill section of Philadelphia north to US 11 in Wilkes-Barre. When first designated, US 309 followed the present corridor of PA 309 to Allentown before heading further east through Slatington, Palmerton, Lehighton, Jim Thorpe, and Nesquehoning and then following present-day PA 309 between Hazleton and Wilkes-Barre. In 1930, US 309 was extended north to New York State Route 17 (NY 17) in Waverly, New York, heading north to Pittston and Tunkhannock before following US 6 between Tunkhannock and Towanda and US 220 between Towanda and Waverly. By 1940, US 309 was extended south to US 1 Bypass (US 1 Byp.)/US 13 Byp./US 422 at Ridge Avenue and City Line Avenue in Philadelphia.

In the 1940s, US 309 was realigned between Ashley and Tunkhannock to Wilkes-Barre, Dallas, and Bowman Creek, with the former alignment between Wilkes-Barre and Pittston becoming unnumbered and the portion between West Pittston and Tunkhannock designated as part of PA 92. In the 1950s, US 309 was rerouted between Allentown and Hazleton to follow US 22 west to Fogelsville before turning north to Pleasant Corners and following present-day PA 309 to Hazleton. Most of the former US 309 between Allentown and Hazleton became a rerouted PA 29, which previously followed present-day PA 309 between the two cities, and is now PA 873, PA 248, US 209, and PA 93. US 309 was realigned to Fort Washington Expressway in 1960 to head to a new southern terminus at US 611 (Broad Street) and Stenton Avenue in Philadelphia and was also realigned to bypass Allentown. US 309 was shifted to follow present-day PA 309 between Allentown and Pleasant Corners in 1962, with PA 100 extended north along the former alignment between Fogelsville and Pleasant Corners. In 1963, the northern terminus of US 309 was cut back to US 6 in Tunkhannock. US 309 was decommissioned in 1968 and replaced with PA 309. In the 1980s, the termini of PA 309 were moved to their present locations. PA 309 was realigned to follow I-81 and North Cross Valley Expressway through the Wilkes-Barre area in 1991.

== Route description ==
=== Philadelphia and Montgomery counties ===
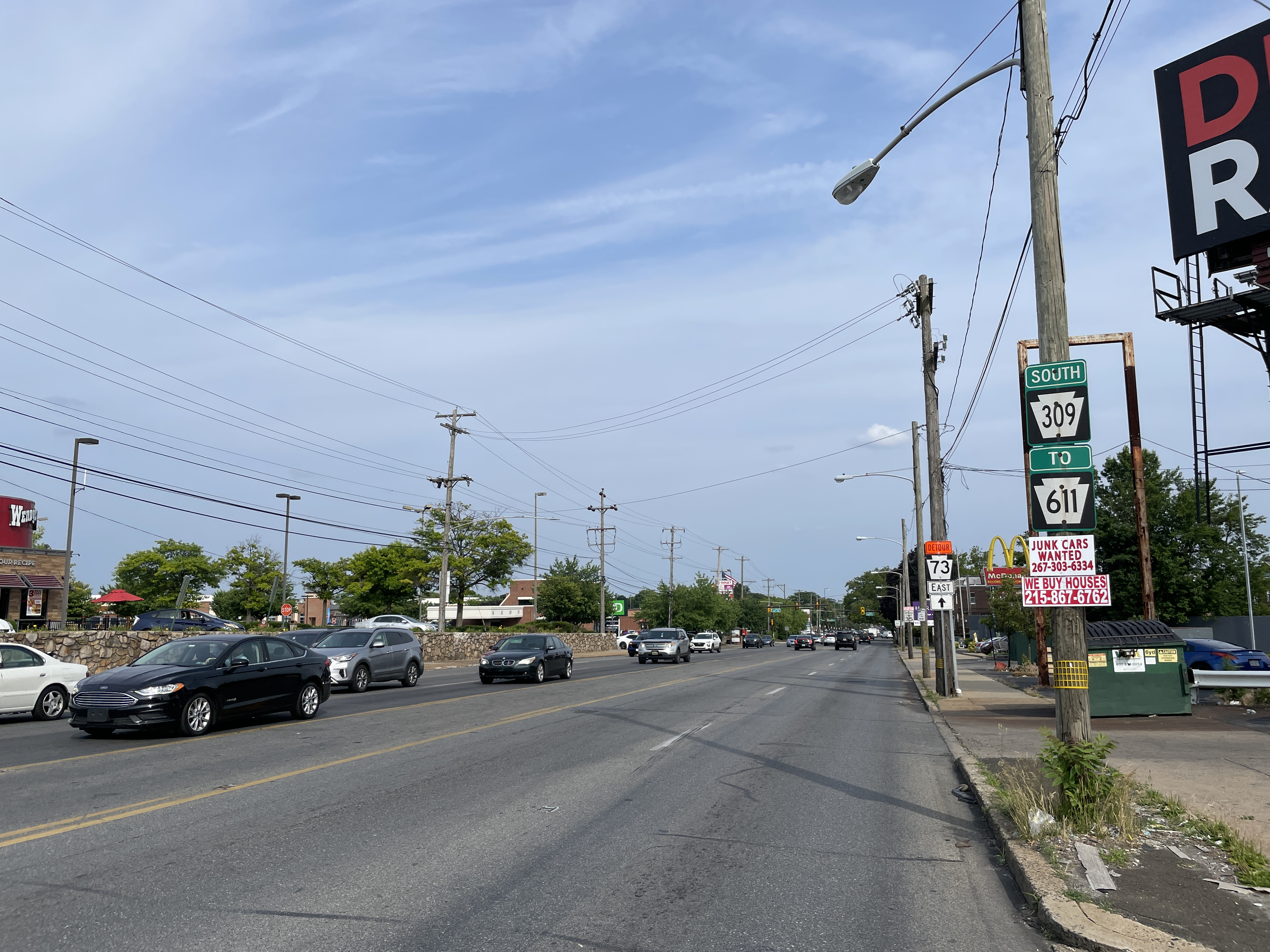
PA 309 southbound along Cheltenham Avenue on the border of Philadelphia and Cheltenham Township

PA 309 begins at an interchange between PA 611 (Old York Road) and Cheltenham Avenue on the border between the East Oak Lane section of Philadelphia in Philadelphia County to the south and Cheltenham Township in Montgomery County to the north. From this interchange, the route heads northwest on four-lane divided Cheltenham Avenue along the border between Philadelphia and Cheltenham Township. A short distance from the PA 611 interchange, the road comes to an intersection with the northern terminus of Broad Street. PA 309 continues northwest as a four-lane undivided road through urban residential and business areas, passing to the north of Northwood Cemetery. The road crosses Washington Lane and heads to the south of Greenleaf at Cheltenham shopping center before it comes to an intersection with Ogontz Avenue north of the West Oak Lane section of Philadelphia, with SEPTA's Cheltenham-Ogontz Bus Loop located on the northwest corner of the intersection. At this point, PA 309 turns north-northwest onto four-lane divided Ogontz Avenue and fully enters Cheltenham Township in Montgomery County, passing businesses as it heads to the west of the shopping center. The route intersects Limekiln Pike and assumes that name, running near suburban residential areas in Cedarbrook.

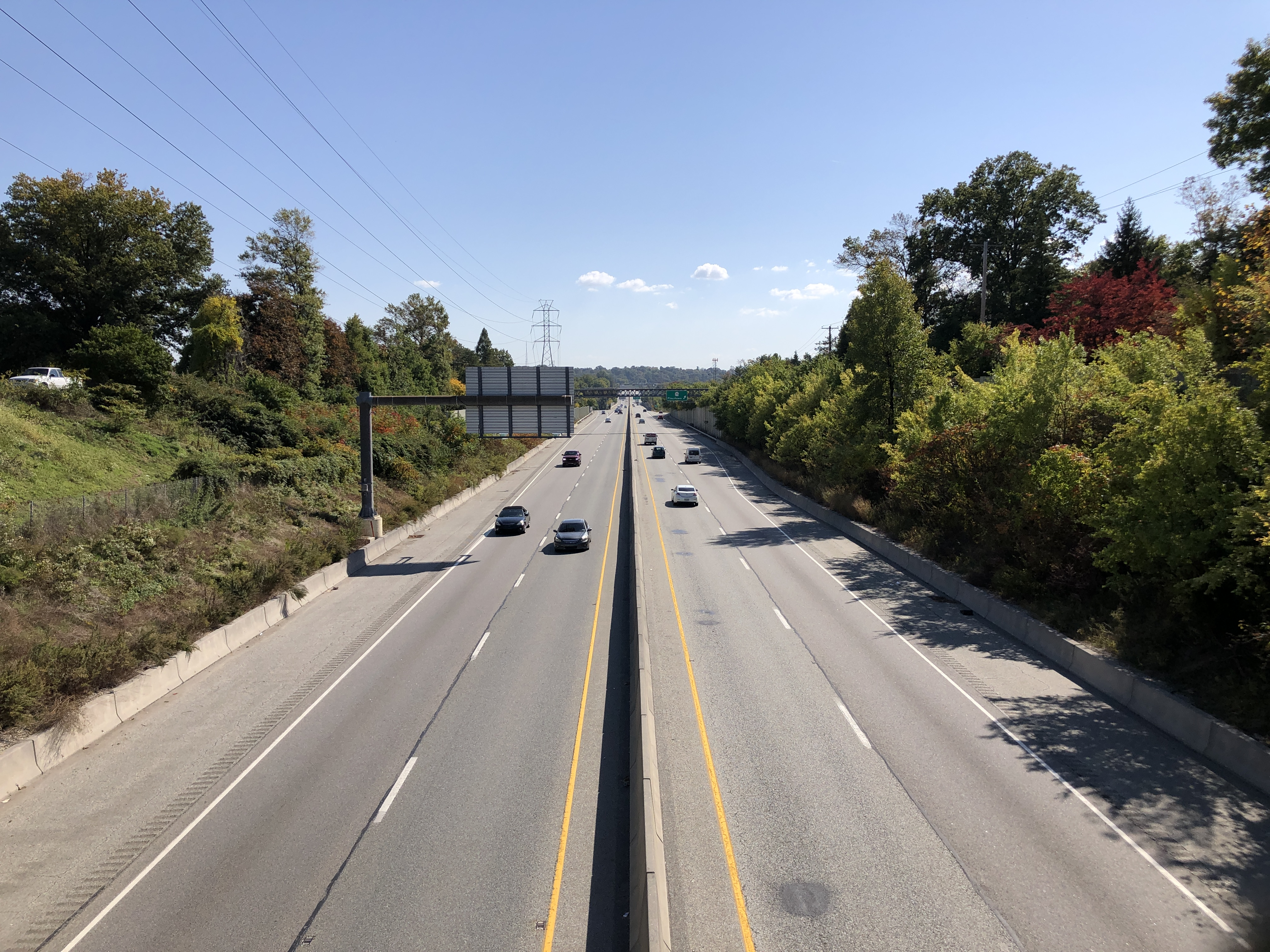
PA 309 southbound in Springfield Township, Montgomery County

PA 309 becomes a four-lane freeway called the Fort Washington Expressway and passes between a high-rise apartment complex to the west and Cheltenham High School to the east as it comes to a diamond interchange with the southern terminus of PA 152 at Easton Road southwest of Wyncote. From there, the route heads northwest and passes to the southwest of Arcadia University and to the northeast of Holy Sepulchre Cemetery before it runs near wooded areas and suburban residential development, crossing into Springfield Township. The freeway curves west and comes to a diamond interchange at Paper Mill Road, where it makes a turn to the northwest as it passes northeast of Springfield Township High School. PA 309 reaches a diamond interchange with PA 73 near Oreland and continues through suburban areas, entering Whitemarsh Township. The freeway heads north as it passes near business parks, crossing Sandy Run. The route heads north-northeast and comes to a bridge over SEPTA's Lansdale/Doylestown Line before it bends north and passes under Norfolk Southern's Morrisville Line. PA 309 enters Upper Dublin Township and comes to a modified cloverleaf interchange connecting to the Fort Washington interchange with the Pennsylvania Turnpike (I-276) and Pennsylvania Avenue in Fort Washington. From here, the freeway runs near business parks before heading north-northwest through wooded residential areas to a partial interchange with Highland Avenue consisting of a northbound exit and southbound entrance. The route heads north through more suburban development to the east of Ambler, passing west of Upper Dublin High School, and reaches a northbound exit and southbound entrance at Susquehanna Road. PA 309 curves northwest and comes to a southbound exit and northbound entrance at Butler Pike a short distance later. The freeway runs through woodland and residential development, crossing into Lower Gwynedd Township and turning north to reach a diamond interchange serving Norristown Road to the east of the community of Spring House. The route runs near business parks and curves northwest, heading near residential development before it comes to the north end of the Fort Washington Expressway and merges onto Bethlehem Pike, with a southbound exit and northbound entrance for Bethlehem Pike.

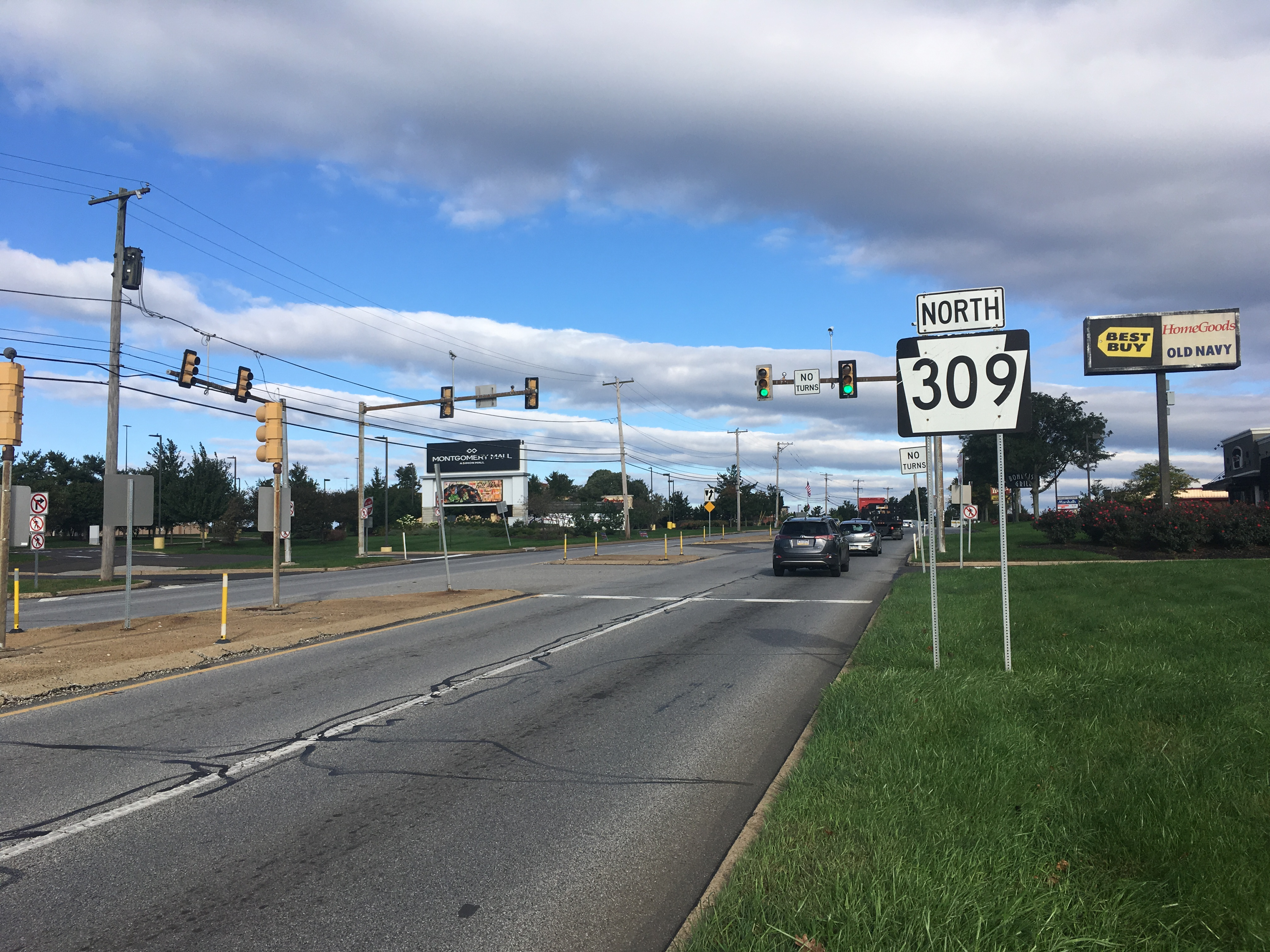
PA 309 northbound concurrent with US 202 Bus. in Montgomeryville

PA 309 continues north on Bethlehem Pike, a four-lane divided highway with a Jersey barrier and several intersections controlled by jughandles. The route comes to a junction with PA 63, at which point it enters Horsham Township. There, the road narrows to four lanes and passes between two shopping centers, crossing into Montgomery Township and heading into the North Penn Valley region. The route bends to the northwest and continues through commercial areas, running to the west of a quarry past the Hartman Road intersection. PA 309 passes more businesses as it continues along the four-lane divided highway and comes to an interchange with the US 202 parkway consisting of a ramp from northbound PA 309 to northbound US 202 and a two-way quadrant ramp on the northwest side of the interchange providing all other movements; PA 309 also crosses under the US 202 Parkway Trail that follows US 202. The road intersects US 202 Bus. (Dekalb Pike) and Upper State Road in Montgomery Square. At this point, US 202 Bus. becomes concurrent with PA 309 and the road passes between the Montgomery Mall to the west and the Airport Square shopping center to the east. The two routes head north past more businesses five-lane road with a center left-turn lane past the North Wales Road intersection. PA 309/US 202 Bus. turns into a four-lane divided highway again and continues into Montgomeryville. Here, the roadway comes to the Five Points intersection, where PA 463 crosses PA 309/US 202 Bus. and US 202 Bus. splits from PA 309 by heading northeast onto Doylestown Road.

Past this intersection, the route transitions into a five-lane road with a center left-turn lane and runs north past more businesses with some wooded residential development, bending northwest. The road enters Hatfield Township and reaches Colmar, where it intersects Broad Street and crosses SEPTA's Lansdale/Doylestown Line at-grade to the west of Colmar station. PA 309 continues past commercial development, crossing the West Branch Neshaminy Creek and passing through Trewigtown. The route becomes a four-lane divided highway and comes to an intersection with Line Lexington Road/County Line Road in Line Lexington, at which point it turns northwest and forms the border between Hatfield Township in Montgomery County to the southwest and New Britain Township in Bucks County to the northeast. After the Hilltown Pike junction, the road runs along the border between Hatfield Township, Montgomery County, to the southwest and Hilltown Township, Bucks County, to the northeast and heads northwest through commercial development and some fields as a five-lane road with a center left-turn lane. In Unionville, the route intersects Unionville Pike, which heads southwest toward Hatfield.

=== Bucks County ===
PA 309 leaves the North Penn Valley region and becomes a four-lane freeway called the Sellersville Bypass, coming to a partial interchange with Bethlehem Pike that has a northbound exit and a southbound exit and entrance in addition to a southbound right-in/right-out with Bergey Road. At this point, the route curves north-northwest to fully enter Hilltown Township in Bucks County. The freeway runs through wooded areas with nearby residential and commercial development and comes to a diamond interchange with PA 113 northeast of Souderton. PA 309 turns north and runs through woodland and farmland with some nearby development, curving northwest and crossing into West Rockhill Township. The route passes over the Bethlehem Line, a railroad line that is owned by SEPTA and operated by the East Penn Railroad, and reaches a diamond interchange with the northern terminus of PA 152 that provides access to Sellersville to the northeast and Telford to the southwest. Past this interchange, the freeway heads through wooded areas and crosses the East Branch Perkiomen Creek before it passes near farmland and curves north. PA 309 runs through woodland with some farm fields and comes to a diamond interchange at Lawn Avenue, which heads west to provide access to PA 563 west of Perkasie, before passing under PA 563. From here, the route heads near more farms and woods and curves northwest, running through dense forests and bending north. PA 309 comes to a southbound exit and northbound entrance with Bethlehem Pike, at which point the Sellersville Bypass freeway ends.

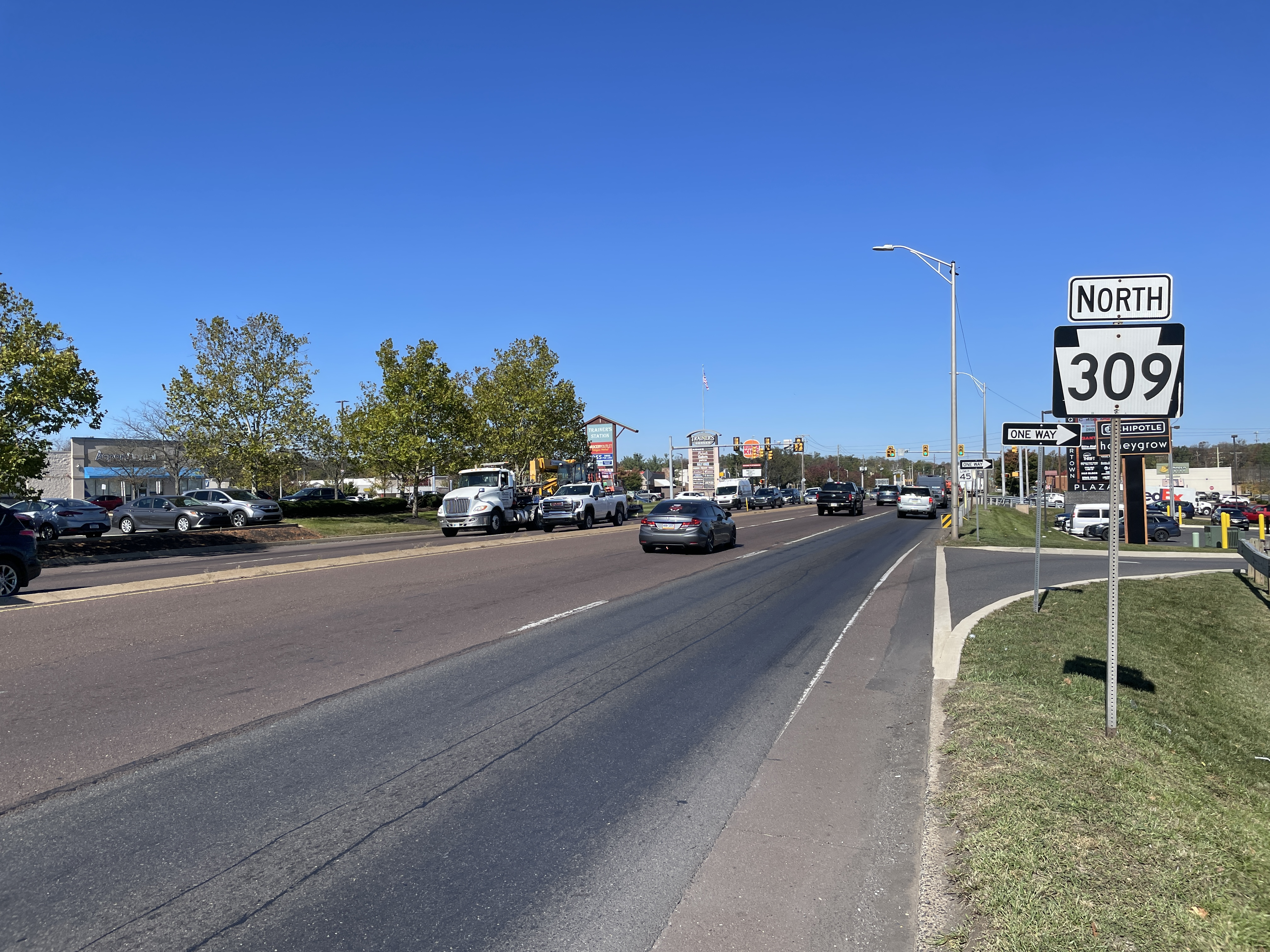
PA 309 northbound past PA 313/PA 663 in Quakertown

From this point, the route heads north-northwest through Rich Hill and crosses into Richland Township, where it becomes four-lane undivided South West End Boulevard and passes through a mix of farm fields and woodland with some commercial development, soon gaining a center left-turn lane and crossing Morgan Creek. The road briefly becomes a divided highway at the Tollgate Road intersection before it continues past businesses as a five-lane road with a center left-turn lane, with another divided highway stretch at the entrance to the Richland Plaza shopping center located east of the road. PA 309 enters Quakertown upon crossing Beaver Run and runs past more businesses as a five-lane road containing a center turn lane. The route becomes a divided highway for a short distance to the south of the Trumbauersville Road intersection before turning into an undivided highway, briefly gaining a median at the Park Avenue intersection before the median transitions into a center left-turn lane. PA 309 turns into a four-lane divided highway and comes to a junction with the western terminus of PA 313 and the northern terminus of PA 663. From this junction, the road becomes North West End Boulevard and runs past shopping centers, becoming the border between Richland Township to the west and Quakertown to the east. PA 309 fully enters Richland Township again and becomes a five-lane road with a center left-turn lane, passing commercial development and woodland. The route briefly turns into a divided highway again as it crosses West Pumping Station Road and heads to the east of a shopping center. PA 309 continues north past wooded areas and businesses as a five-lane road with a center turn lane, passing to the west of Shelly. The road crosses into Springfield Township and becomes Bethlehem Pike, running north-northwest through more forested areas with some commercial development.

=== Lehigh County ===
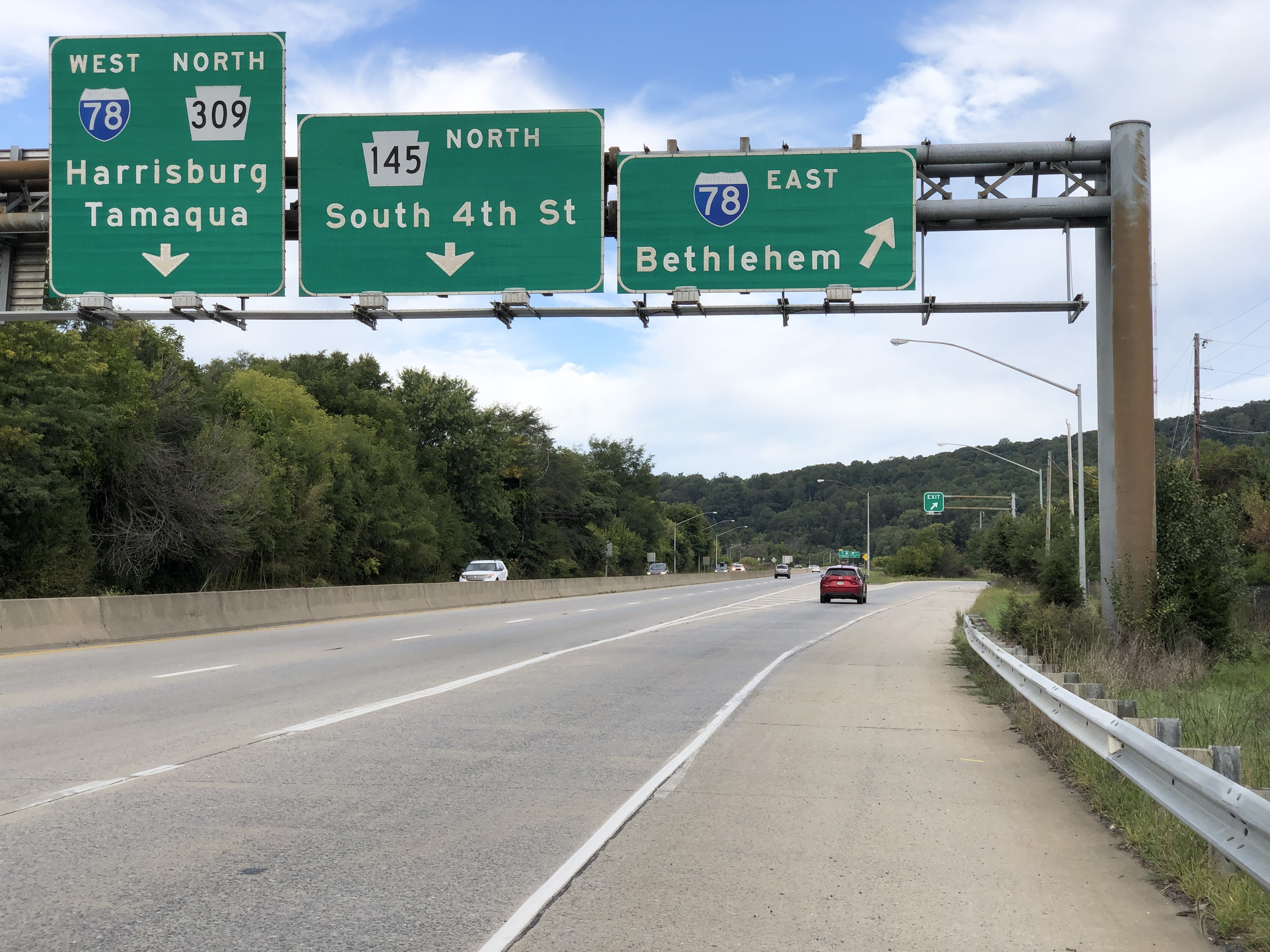
PA 309 northbound at the interchange with I-78 and PA 145 in Lanark

PA 309 enters Lehigh County, which is in the Lehigh Valley region, and forms the border between Coopersburg to the west and Upper Saucon Township to the east, heading north and fully entering Coopersburg. The route becomes South 3rd Street and passes commercial establishments before it turns into a four-lane divided highway and passes a mix of homes and businesses. Upon crossing State Street, the road name changes to North 3rd Street, running past more development. PA 309 becomes the border between Upper Saucon Township to the west and Coopersburg to the east and passes a couple shopping centers before fully entering Upper Saucon Township and running between woodland and commercial development to the west and farmland to the east as an unnamed road. The route curves to the northwest and heads through wooded areas, splitting into a one-way pair carrying two lanes in each direction and reaching an intersection with the southern terminus of PA 378 in Center Valley.

Past this intersection, the northbound direction of PA 309 passes homes as Main Street, heading south of Southern Lehigh High School, while the southbound direction runs through wooded areas with nearby residential subdivisions along an unnamed road. Both directions of the route rejoin and continue northwest through residential and commercial development and some woods as an unnamed four-lane divided highway. The road runs through farmland and residential subdivisions before it crosses Saucon Creek and reaches an intersection with jughandles at West Saucon Valley Road/Center Valley Parkway.

Past this intersection, PA 309 becomes a four-lane freeway and comes to an interchange with I-78 and the southern terminus of PA 145 in Lanark. At this point, PA 309 heads west concurrent with I-78 westbound on a six-lane freeway, while PA 145 northbound provides access to Allentown. The highway comes to a southbound exit and northbound entrance with Rock Road that provides a connection to PA 145 in Summit Lawn, at which point it crosses into Salisbury Township. Following this, I-78/PA 309 descends forested South Mountain. After crossing the mountain, the freeway heads into Allentown and passes near neighborhoods, coming to a northbound exit ramp serving Emaus Avenue. The highway runs near industrial areas and passes over Norfolk Southern's Reading Line before it comes to a partial cloverleaf interchange at Lehigh Street.

I-78/PA 309 heads south of Allentown Queen City Municipal Airport and runs near residential areas before running through woodland, passing through a small section of Salisbury Township before heading back into Allentown and crossing Little Lehigh Creek. The freeway heads back into Salisbury Township and runs between residential areas to the north and office buildings to the south before reaching a partial cloverleaf interchange with the northern terminus of the southern section of PA 29 at Cedar Crest Boulevard. Past this interchange, the highway heads north of Lehigh Valley Hospital–Cedar Crest and crosses into South Whitehall Township, passing between residential areas to the north and farm fields to the south and curving northwest to come to a partial cloverleaf interchange with the northern terminus of US 222 and the southern terminus of PA 222 at Hamilton Boulevard, which provides access to Allentown and Reading. From here, the freeway enters Lower Macungie Township and runs past commercial development to the southwest of the Dorney Park & Wildwater Kingdom amusement park. PA 309 splits from I-78 at a partial interchange and continues north along a four-lane freeway, passing through a small corner of Upper Macungie Township before entering South Whitehall Township again. The route continues north past farmland with some residential and commercial development and comes to a cloverleaf interchange at Tilghman Street. The freeway runs northwest near more homes and commercial establishments and reaches a cloverleaf interchange with the US 22 freeway a short distance east of that route's interchange with the Pennsylvania Turnpike Northeast Extension, also known as I-476.

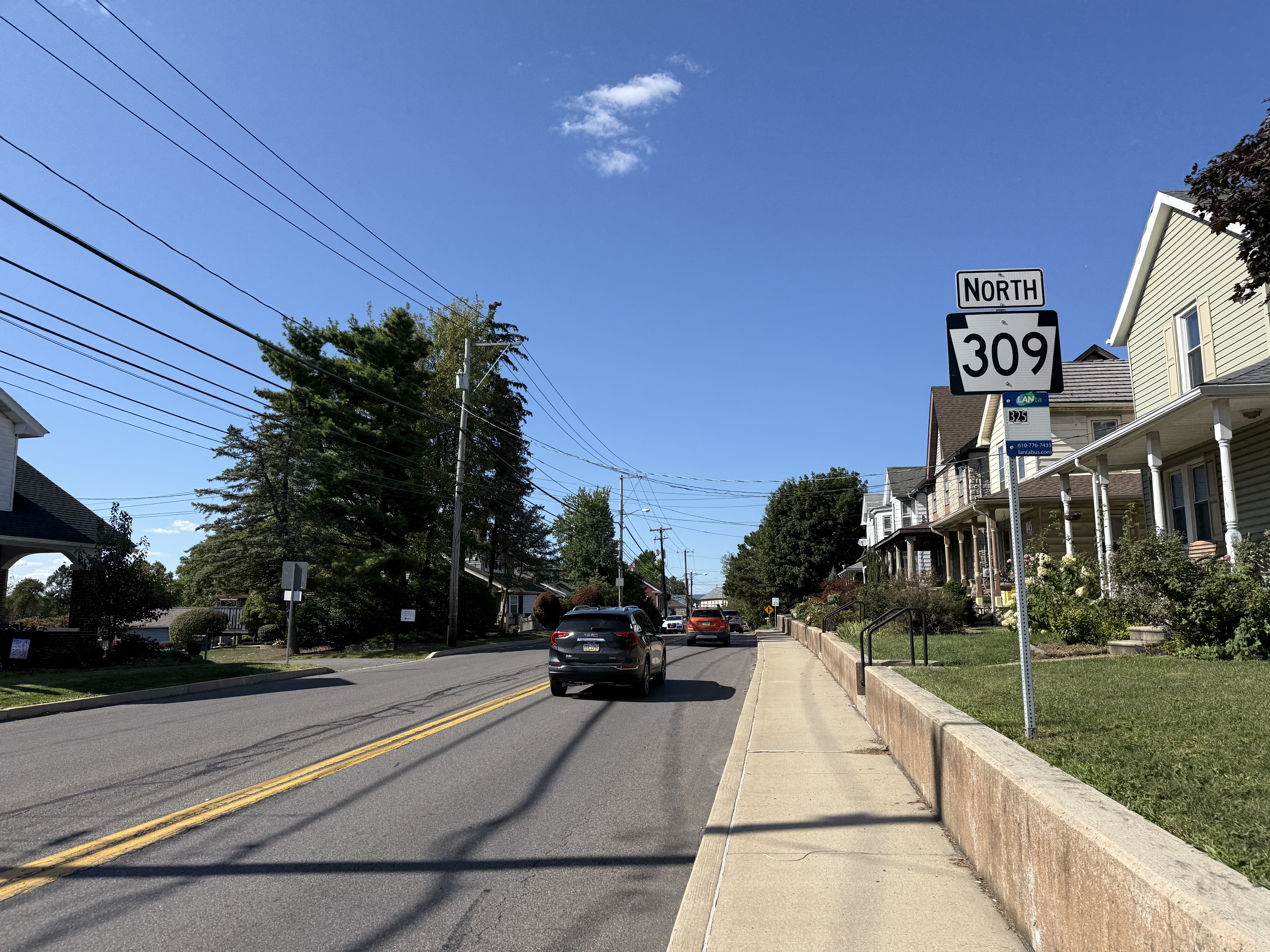
PA 309 northbound in Schnecksville

Past the US 22 interchange, the freeway ends and PA 309 continues northwest as an unnamed four-lane divided highway with at-grade intersections, passing near commercial development. The road curves to the west-northwest and heads through Walbert, where it crosses Norfolk Southern's C&F Secondary at-grade and narrows to two lanes. The route becomes a two-lane undivided road and runs near businesses, crossing under I-476. PA 309 curves north and heads through a mix of farm fields, woodland, and homes and businesses, passing through Guthsville, where it crosses Jordan Creek, and Orefield. The road bends to the north-northwest and continues into North Whitehall Township, where it passes more residences and a few businesses along with some rural land. The route briefly widens into a four-lane divided highway and runs through more developed areas as a three-lane road with a center left-turn lane, passing to the east of Lehigh Carbon Community College and the Lehigh Career and Technical Institute. PA 309 becomes two lanes again and runs past homes and businesses in Schnecksville, where it curves northwest and comes to an intersection with the southern terminus of PA 873. Here, PA 309 turns to the west and heads northwest near residential developments. The road bends west and winds through a mix of farmland and woodland, heading into Heidelberg Township. The route runs through more rural land with occasional development and reaches Pleasant Corners, where it crosses Jordan Creek and comes to an intersection with the northern terminus of PA 100. PA 309 continues west through agricultural areas with some woods and homes and passes south of Northwestern Lehigh High School as it enters Lynn Township. The road heads to the north of a golf course before it comes to a junction with the northern terminus of PA 143 east of New Tripoli, where it briefly becomes a divided highway. At this point, the route turns to the northwest as an undivided road and passes through farmland with some trees, homes, and businesses, crossing Ontelaunee Creek. The road gains a second northbound lane further to the north. PA 309 curves to the west-southwest and ascends forested Blue Mountain.

=== Schuylkill and Carbon counties ===
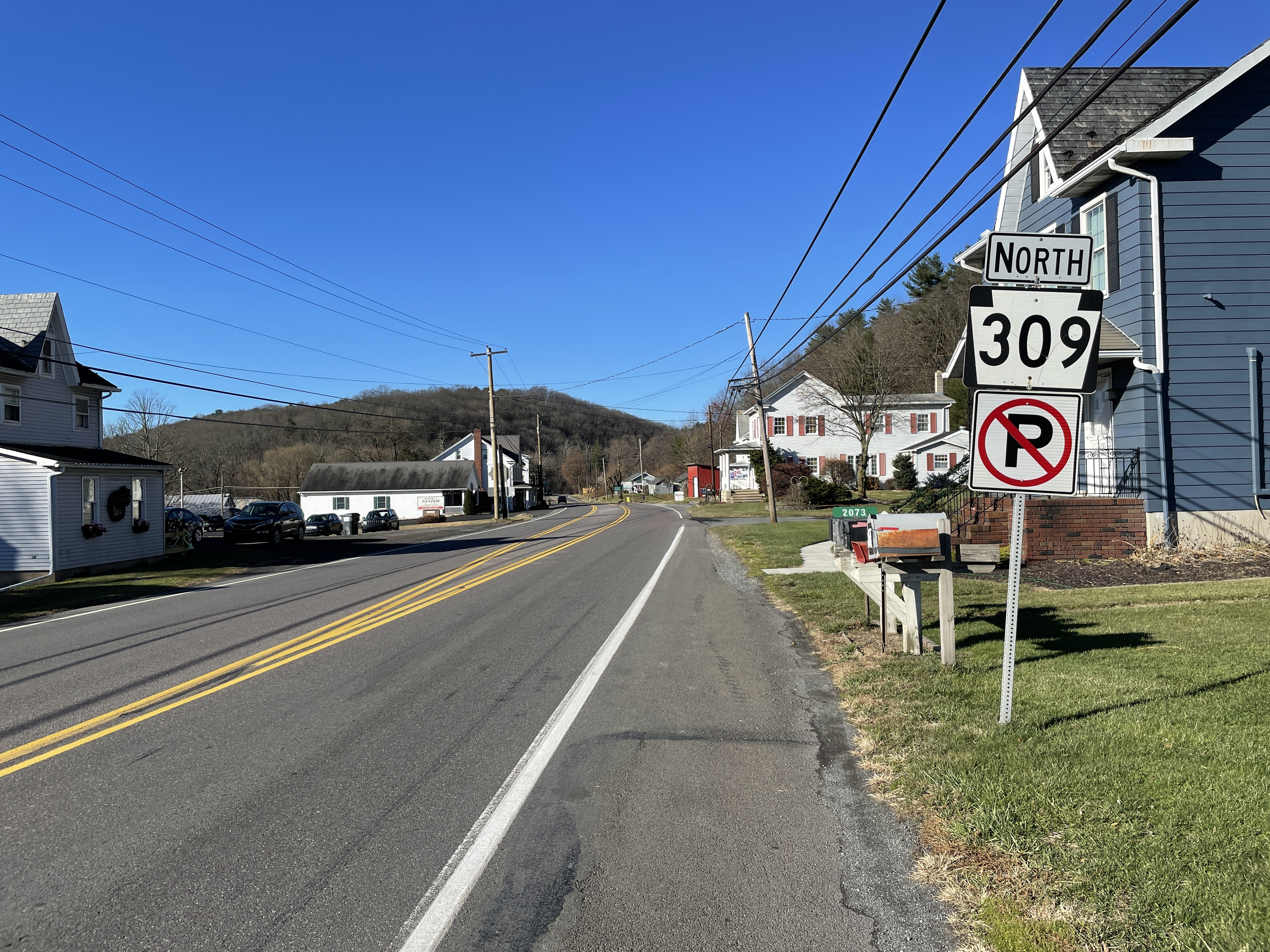
PA 309 northbound past PA 895 in West Penn Township

At the summit of Blue Mountain, PA 309 turns into a two-lane road and enters West Penn Township in Schuylkill County, where the name becomes West Penn Pike and it crosses the Appalachian Trail. The route heads west and descends the mountain as a three-lane road with one northbound lane and two southbound lanes. At the base of Blue Mountain, the road runs northwest through wooded areas with some farm fields. PA 309 narrows to two lanes and crosses Lizard Creek before it comes to an intersection with PA 895 in Snyders. The road continues northwest through forested areas with some fields and residential and commercial development, passing through Leibeyville. The route curves to the west and widens to four lanes before it comes to an intersection with PA 443, at which point that route heads west for a concurrency with PA 309. The two routes reach South Tamaqua, where PA 443 splits to the southwest.

PA 309 heads northwest near a coal mine before curving north into forested areas and running along the east bank of the Little Schuylkill River, passing between Second Mountain to the west and Mauch Chunk Mountain to the east. The road passes near a few commercial establishments and enters Tamaqua, continuing through forests and running between Sharp Mountain to the west and Pisgah Mountain to the east. The route becomes two-lane Center Street and runs past businesses, crossing the Little Schuylkill River and a Reading Blue Mountain and Northern Railroad line at-grade. PA 309 runs past homes and businesses and comes to the Five Points intersection with US 209 in the center of Tamaqua. Past this intersection, the route splits into a one-way pair along Mauch Chunk Street northbound and North Railroad Street southbound, running to the east of the Reading Blue Mountain and Northern Railroad's Reading Division line and passing east of the former Tamaqua station along the railroad line. The one-way pair carries one lane in each direction. Northbound PA 309 shifts to Pine Street and the route continues to follow the one-way streets past residences and a few businesses. Both directions of PA 309 rejoin along an unnamed three-lane road with a center left-turn lane and crosses the Little Schuylkill River, heading into forested areas to the east of the river and to the west of Nesquehoning Mountain and curving northwest.

The route leaves Tamaqua for Rush Township and the name changes to Claremont Avenue, becoming a three-lane road with two northbound lanes and one southbound lane and curving to the north away from the Little Schuylkill River. The road heads into Hometown and runs near homes and a few businesses, curving northwest and coming to an intersection with PA 54. From here, PA 309 widens into a four-lane divided highway and heads past businesses. The route comes to a bridge over the Reading Blue Mountain and Northern Railroad's Reading Division line and runs through wooded areas and commercial development. The road runs through forests and curves north, passing to the west of Broad Mountain. PA 309 bends to the north-northwest and passes through Still Creek and Ginther. The route heads back into wooded areas and crosses into Kline Township, curving to the northeast and north along Mile Hill Road. The road runs north-northeast and passes to the west of a large coal mine before it comes to a trumpet interchange with a ramp providing access to I-81 to the west. Past this interchange, PA 309 heads through forests with some development before passing under a Reading Blue Mountain and Northern Railroad line and entering McAdoo. Here, the route becomes South Kennedy Drive and narrows to a two-lane undivided road, running past homes and a few businesses. The road crosses Blaine Street in the center of McAdoo, where its name changes to North Kennedy Drive, passing more residences. PA 309 leaves McAdoo and heads through a small section of Kline Township. The route enters Banks Township in Carbon County and becomes unnamed, heading to the east of a coal mine before running past homes in Audenried.

=== Luzerne and Wyoming counties ===
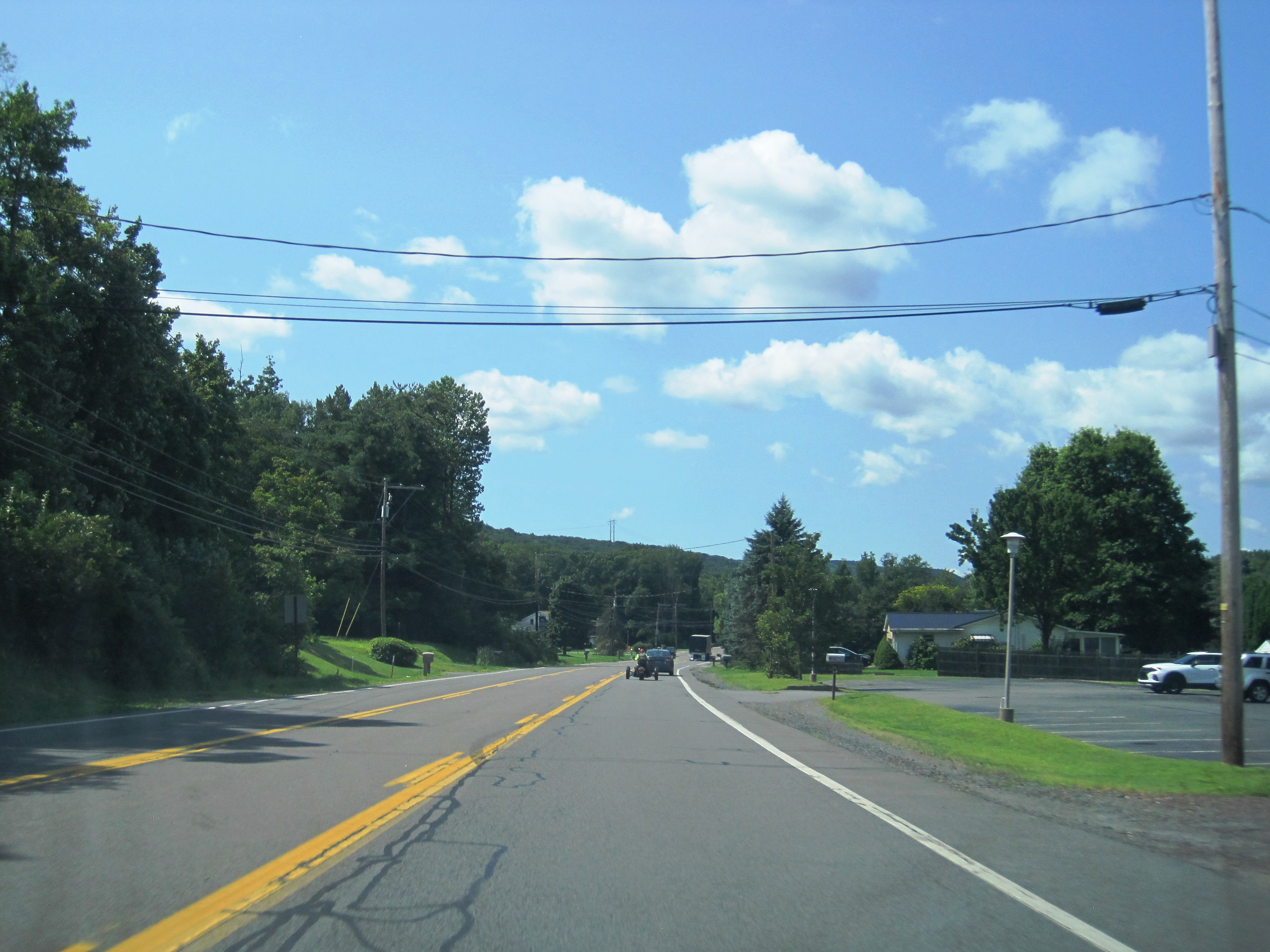
PA 309 southbound in Wright Township

PA 309 heads into Hazle Township in Luzerne County, which is in the Wyoming Valley region, and becomes South Church Street. The route runs past coal mines and widens to four lanes, curving to the north. The road passes through wooded areas with some homes and businesses and comes to an intersection with PA 424, where it briefly turns into a divided highway. Past this intersection, the route becomes undivided again and crosses Norfolk Southern's Sheppton Industrial Track at-grade, heading past homes and commercial buildings and curving northeast into Hazleton. PA 309 runs through commercial areas and woodland, narrowing to two lanes. The road passes under Norfolk Southern's Hazleton Running Track and runs through residential areas before passing businesses and becoming a three-lane road with a center turn lane. The route crosses the Hazleton Running Track at-grade and passes west of the Church Street Station serving HPT buses as it heads into the downtown area of Hazleton, where it reaches a junction with PA 93. Past this junction, PA 309 becomes two-lane North Church Street and leaves the downtown to head past homes. The road curves to the north at the Diamond Avenue intersection and continues through residential areas, gaining a center left-turn lane coming to an intersection with the northern terminus of PA 924. The route runs through more of Hazelton and passes businesses as it reaches a junction with the western terminus of PA 940 on the northern border of Hazelton. At this point, PA 309 crosses back into Hazle Township and runs through commercial areas as an unnamed road, passing to the west of Church Hill Mall and widening to five lanes. The road runs to the east of Hazleton Municipal Airport and heads past residences and businesses in Milnesville, briefly becoming a four-lane divided highway at the Airport Beltway/Louis Schiavo Drive intersection. The route turns into an undivided road again and runs through wooded areas with some homes, passing to the west of a coal mine and curving northeast.

PA 309 enters Butler Township and becomes South Hunter Highway, heading through forested areas as it traverses Buck Mountain as a two-lane road and gaining a second southbound lane as it descends the mountain. The route turns to the north and crosses Little Nescopeck Creek, running through a mix of fields, woods, and development as a two-lane road briefly before becoming four lanes. The road heads northeast and runs through forests to the west of Green Mountain, narrowing to two lanes before becoming three lanes with two southbound lanes and one northbound lane. PA 309 bends to the north again and becomes four-lane undivided North Hunter Highway, running through wooded areas with some homes and businesses. The road crosses Nescopeck Creek and passes through Honey Hole and Edgewood. The route becomes a divided highway and comes to a diamond interchange with I-80. Past this interchange, PA 309 becomes a three-lane undivided road with two northbound lanes and one southbound lane and runs through wooded areas with some residences and commercial establishments, passing by the entrance of Sand Springs. The road curves to the north-northeast and traverses forested Nescopeck Mountain, widening to four lanes as it comes to the summit in Nescopeck Pass and bends north. The route heads into Dorrance Township and becomes South Mountain Boulevard, heading northeast to descend Nescopeck Mountain with one northbound lane and two southbound lanes. PA 309 switches to two northbound lanes and one southbound lane and heads into Wright Township, becoming a three-lane road with a center turn lane as it passes near wooded residential development and runs through Konns Corners. The road runs through forests with some commercial development, passing east of Crestwood High School and crossing Bow Creek before entering Fairview Township. The route heads near homes and businesses in Fairview Heights, becoming North Mountain Boulevard and widening to five lanes. PA 309 narrows back to three lanes and crosses Big Wapwallopen Creek before it heads through Mountain Top, curving to the northwest and coming to an intersection with the northern terminus of PA 437 in Fairview. The road runs through forested areas as it passes through Solomon Gap in Penobscot Mountain, narrowing to two lanes before turning into a four-lane divided highway. The route curves north and crosses Solomon Creek as it enters Hanover Township, with the median widening as it continues to wind north through the gap in the mountain east of the creek. The median narrows and PA 309 crosses Pine Creek as it continues northwest, passing southwest of a section of the Pinchot State Forest.

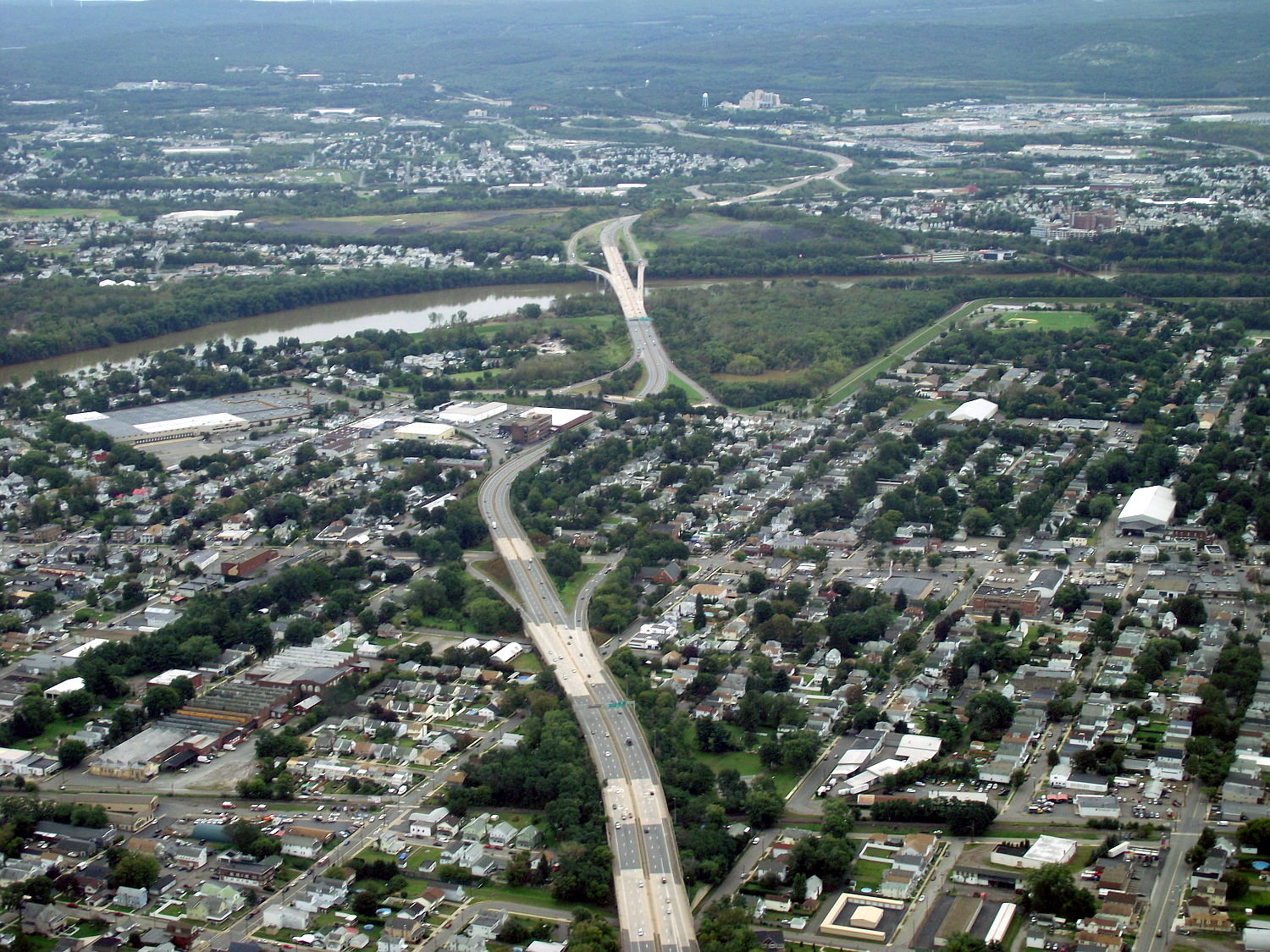
PA 309 as the North Cross Valley Expressway in the Wyoming Valley

PA 309 turns north and crosses into Ashley, where it comes to an interchange with I-81. At this point, PA 309 heads northeast concurrent with I-81 on a four-lane freeway while PA 309 Bus. continues north toward Wilkes-Barre. Within the interchange, the highway crosses back into Hanover Township before entering Wilkes-Barre Township. I-81/PA 309 runs near residential and commercial development, with PA 309 Bus. closely parallel to the northwest. The freeway bends farther from the business route and passes through Georgetown, running through wooded areas and coming to a trumpet interchange which provides access to Highland Park Boulevard, serving multiple shopping centers and the Mohegan Sun Arena at Casey Plaza, where the Wilkes-Barre/Scranton Penguins of the American Hockey League play. I-81/PA 309 heads through more woodland with some nearby development to the northwest, crossing into Plains Township and curving north.

PA 309 splits from I-81 at a partial cloverleaf interchange by heading northwest on the North Cross Valley Expressway, a six-lane freeway, while PA 115 heads east (south) along the interchange's right-of-way. The route follows the North Cross Valley Expressway through wooded areas with adjacent development, coming to a partial cloverleaf interchange with the northern terminus of PA 309 Bus. and the southern terminus of PA 315. At this point, the freeway enters the Wilkes-Barre and narrows to four lanes, running near homes and businesses and curving northwest. PA 309 passes over a Luzerne and Susquehanna Railway line and comes to a partial cloverleaf interchange with North Wilkes-Barre Boulevard that provides access to downtown Wilkes-Barre. The route leaves Wilkes-Barre for Plains Township again and crosses over Mill Creek and Norfolk Southern's Sunbury Line before heading near woods and reaching a diamond interchange serving South River Street to the southwest of Plains. Past here, the freeway passes over a Reading Blue Mountain and Northern Railroad line and the Susquehanna River, at which point it enters Forty Fort and comes to a northbound exit and southbound entrance at Rutter Avenue that provides indirect access to US 11. PA 309 continues into Kingston and runs near residential and commercial development, reaching a southbound exit and northbound entrance at US 11. The route widens to six lanes and runs near more development, passing over a Luzerne and Susquehanna Railway line and entering Luzerne. The freeway reaches a northbound exit and southbound entrance at Union Street, where it narrows to four lanes and crosses into Pringle, heading across Toby Creek. PA 309 continues northwest and passes through Courtdale before it comes to a southbound exit and northbound entrance with Main Street on the border between Courtdale to the west and Luzerne to the east.

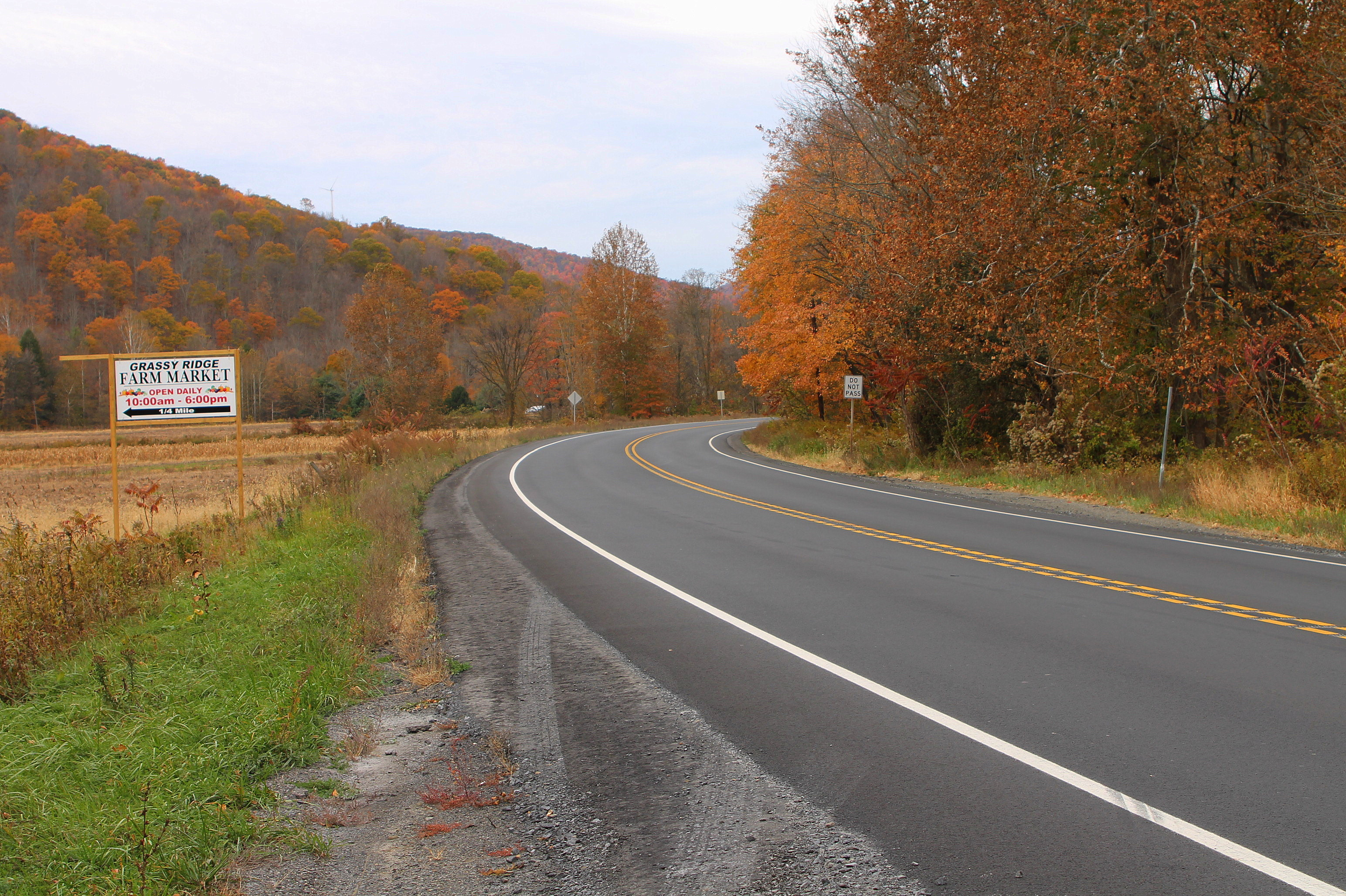
PA 309 northbound in Monroe Township close to its northern terminus at PA 29

At this interchange, the North Cross Valley Expressway ends and PA 309 becomes four-lane at-grade divided South Memorial Highway, crossing Toby Creek again and heading into the Back Mountain region of Luzerne County. The route runs through Kingston Township before heading across Toby Creek back into Courtdale and curving west. The road crosses the creek back into Kingston Township and heads northwest through forested areas alongside the creek between Larksville Mountain to the west and Bunker Hill to the east. The route runs past residences and businesses in Trucksville, becoming a five-lane road with a center left-turn lane. PA 309 continues north-northwest through wooded areas of development on North Memorial Highway, turning into a divided highway in Shavertown and crossing Center Street. The route becomes a four-lane undivided road and heads into Dallas Township, passing under Overbrook Avenue. The road continues past commercial development as Memorial Highway and gains a center turn lane, heading into Dallas. PA 309 comes to an intersection with the southern terminus of PA 415, which provides access to PA 118, and turns northwest onto Tunkhannock Highway, a three-lane road with a center left-turn lane. The road runs through wooded residential areas and heads back into Dallas Township, curving to the north. The route bends northwest and passes near businesses. PA 309 curves north and narrows to two lanes, passing through wooded areas with some fields and development. The road turns northwest and continues through rural land, heading back to the north near Kunkle and crossing Leonard Creek. The route enters Monroe Township in Wyoming County and continues through forests with some fields and homes to the west of Leonard Creek as an unnamed road, bending northwest and passing through Beaumont.

PA 309 runs through more rural areas and comes to its northern terminus at an intersection with PA 29 near Bowman Creek, where the road continues north as part of PA 29 toward Tunkhannock.

== History ==
U.S. Route 309
- Location: Philadelphia – Tunkhannock
- Length: 142.25 mi (228.93 km)
- Existed: 1926–1968

The portion of PA 309 between Philadelphia and the Lehigh Valley follows the routing of a Native American path now referred to as the "Minsi Trail" that dates back to the 18th century. This path, named after the Minsi Indians, connected the Blue Mountains to areas to the south. A highway called the King's Road was created between Philadelphia and Bethlehem in the 1760s along the route of the Minsi Trail; the first trip along this road was made by stage wagon in 1763. In 1804, a turnpike called the Bethlehem Turnpike was created to run between Philadelphia and Bethlehem. The turnpike was authorized to collect tolls in 1834, with many of its tollgates erected. The Bethlehem Pike became a free road in 1904 and tolls were removed in 1910.

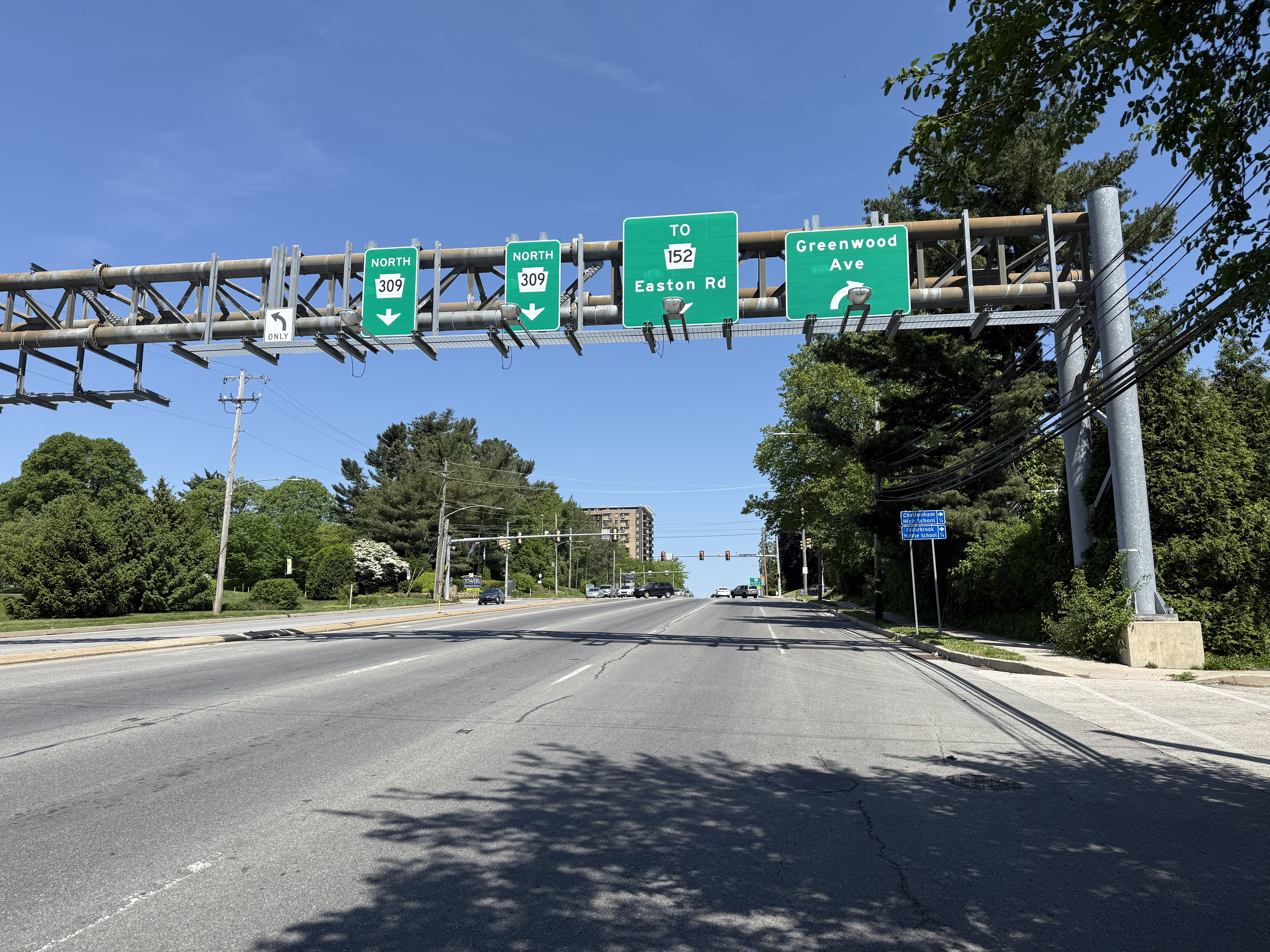
PA 309 northbound approaching Greenwood Avenue in Cheltenham Township

Following the passage of the Sproul Road Bill in 1911, what would become US 309 was designated as Legislative Route 153 between Philadelphia and Allentown, Legislative Route 163 between Allentown and Mauch Chunk (present-day Jim Thorpe), part of Legislative Route 162 between Mauch Chunk and Nesquehoning, and Legislative Route 170 between Nesquehoning and Wilkes-Barre. Meanwhile, the present-day corridor of PA 309 between Schnecksville and Tamaqua was designated as Legislative Route 226, between Tamaqua and Hazleton as Legislative Route 185, and between Wilkes-Barre and Bowman Creek as part of Legislative Route 11. With the creation of the U.S. Highway System in 1926, US 309, a spur of US 9, was designated to run from US 120/PA 13 in Philadelphia north to US 11/PA 19 in Wilkes-Barre. From Philadelphia, the route followed Bethlehem Pike north through Spring House, Montgomeryville, Sellersville, and Quakertown to Center Valley. From here, US 309 continued northwest to Allentown and passed through the city along Jordan Street, 5th Street, Auburn Street, Lehigh Street, 7th Street, Hamilton Street, 17th Street, Liberty Street, and 19th Street.

North of Allentown, the route continued west along Walbert Avenue before turning north at Walbert and passing through Schnecksville, Neffs, and Slatington. US 309 crossed the Lehigh River and continued north along the east bank of the river through Palmerton and Bowmanstown to Weissport, where it intersected US 209. At this point, US 309 headed west concurrent with US 209 through Lehighton, Mauch Chunk, Nesquehoning, Lansford, and Coaldale to Tamaqua. At Tamaqua, US 309 split from US 209 and headed north through McAdoo, Hazleton, Mountain Top, and Ashley to Wilkes-Barre. In Wilkes-Barre, US 309 followed Hazle Avenue, Park Avenue, South Street, and River Street to its terminus at US 11/PA 19. In 1927, PA 12 was designated concurrent with US 309 between Philadelphia and Center Valley while PA 22 was designated concurrent with US 309 between US 22/PA 3 in Allentown and US 11/PA 19 in Wilkes-Barre. The section of present-day PA 309 between southeast of Dallas and Bowman Creek was designated as part of the northern section of PA 62 in 1927.

Pennsylvania Route 22
- Location: Allentown – Wilkes-Barre
- Existed: 1927–1928

Pennsylvania Route 130
- Location: Allentown – Wilkes-Barre
- Existed: 1928–1930

By 1928, US 309 was shifted to a more direct alignment between Nesquehoning and Hazleton. By this time, the entire length of US 309 was paved while the state highway was under construction between Quakertown and Center Valley and for a distance to the north of Hazleton. In 1928, the present-day alignment of PA 309 between Schnecksville and Hazleton was designated as part of PA 29 while part of PA 92 was designated along the present-day section of PA 309 from southeast of Dallas north to Bowman Creek, replacing PA 62. At this time, this portion of PA 29 was paved between US 309 in Schnecksville and PA 143 in New Tripoli and between PA 925 south of Tamaqua and US 309 in Hazleton while PA 92 was paved to a point north of Dallas. In 1928, PA 312 was designated concurrent with US 309 between PA 12 in Center Valley and US 22/PA 3 in Allentown while PA 130 replaced the concurrent PA 22 designation north of Allentown. The under construction portions of US 309 between Quakertown and Center Valley and to the north of Hazleton were completed by 1930 while the concurrent PA 12, PA 312, and PA 130 designations were removed from US 309 by 1930. In 1929, the American Association of State Highway Officials (AASHO) approved extending US 309 north from Wilkes-Barre to South Waverly. In 1930, US 309 was extended north from Wilkes-Barre to NY 17 (Chemung Street) in Waverly, New York. From Wilkes-Barre, the route followed the former alignment of US 11 along River Street and River Road to Pittston. US 309 ran northwest concurrent with US 11 to West Pittston, where it continued northwest along the former alignment of PA 29 parallel to the Susquehanna River to an intersection with US 6 in Osterhout. From here, US 309 ran northwest concurrent with US 6 through Tunkhannock and Wyalusing to Towanda. In Towanda, US 309 split from US 6 and headed north concurrent with US 220 through Athens, Sayre, and South Waverly before US 220/US 309 crossed into New York and ended at NY 17. By 1930, PA 29 was under construction from Blue Mountain to south of Tamaqua.

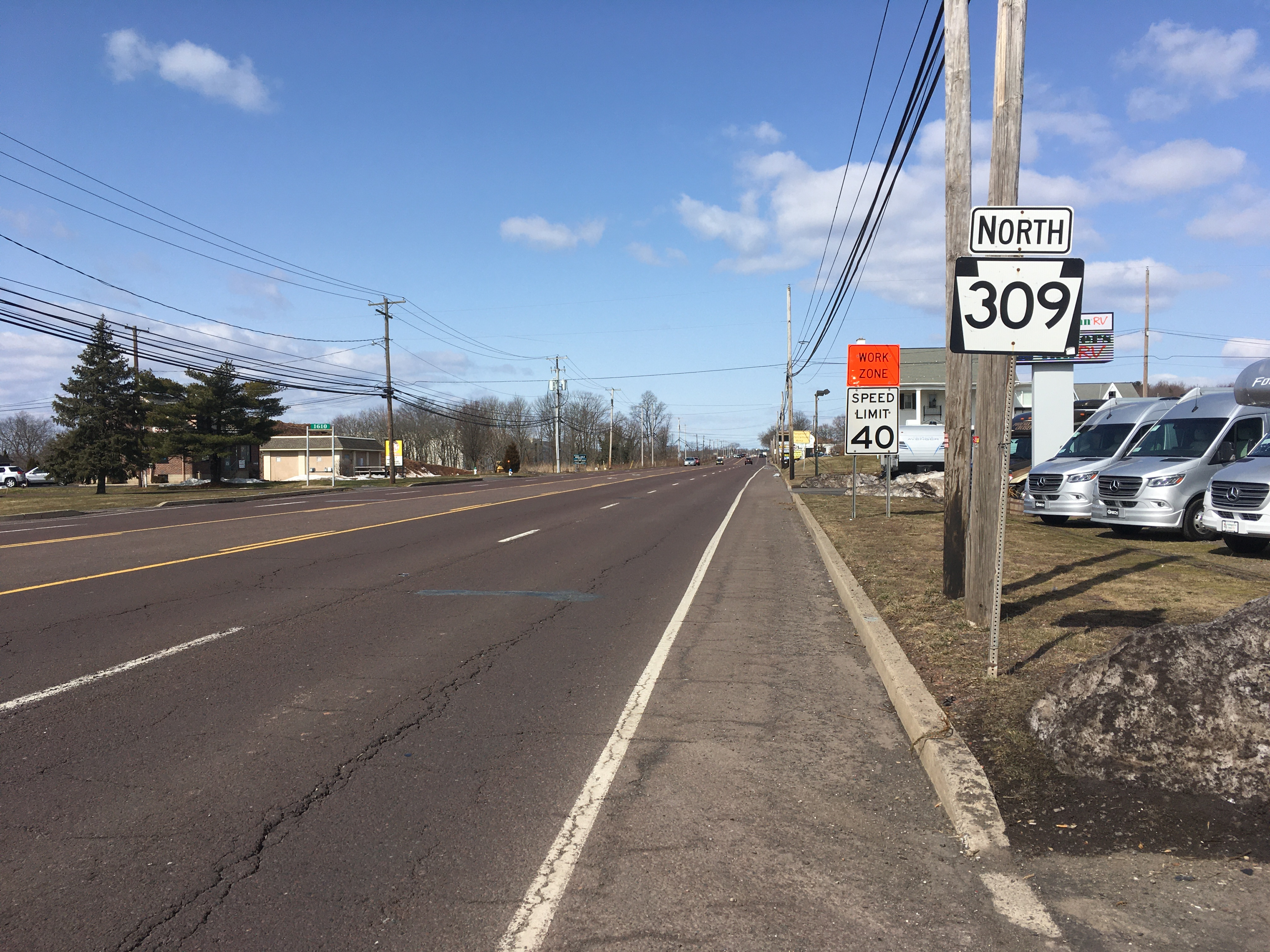
PA 309 northbound near Hatfield

The southern terminus of US 309 was extended from its previous location at US 422 (Germantown Avenue) in the Chestnut Hill section of Philadelphia to US 1 Byp./US 13 Byp./US 422 at Ridge Avenue and City Line Avenue in Philadelphia by 1940, following US 422 Byp. along Germantown Avenue before heading south along Allens Lane and Lincoln Drive. By 1940, the alignment of US 309 in Allentown was shifted to follow 7th Street and US 22 along Tilghman Street to 19th Street while the alignment in Wilkes-Barre was shifted at South Street to follow Washington Street, Butler Street, Main Street, and Courtright Street to River Street. By 1940, US 309 was widened to a multilane road between PA 73 in Whitemarsh and Allentown, along the US 209 concurrency between Lehighton and Packerton, for a short distance in Mountain Top, between Ashley and Wilkes-Barre, between Wilkes-Barre and US 11 in Pittston, along the US 6 concurrency between PA 92 and PA 29 in Tunkhannock and a stretch to the northwest of Tunkhannock, and along the US 220 concurrency between Athens and Sayre. By this time, the entire length of PA 29 between Schnecksville and Hazleton was paved, with the route realigned to bypass New Tripoli along the present-day alignment of PA 309 and the stretch across Blue Mountain and between PA 925 in South Tamaqua and US 209 in Tamaqua widened to a multilane road. The section of PA 115 between Wilkes-Barre and PA 92 near Luzerne that would later become part of US 309 was widened to a multilane road while the section of PA 92 between north of Dallas and PA 29 in Bowman Creek was paved.

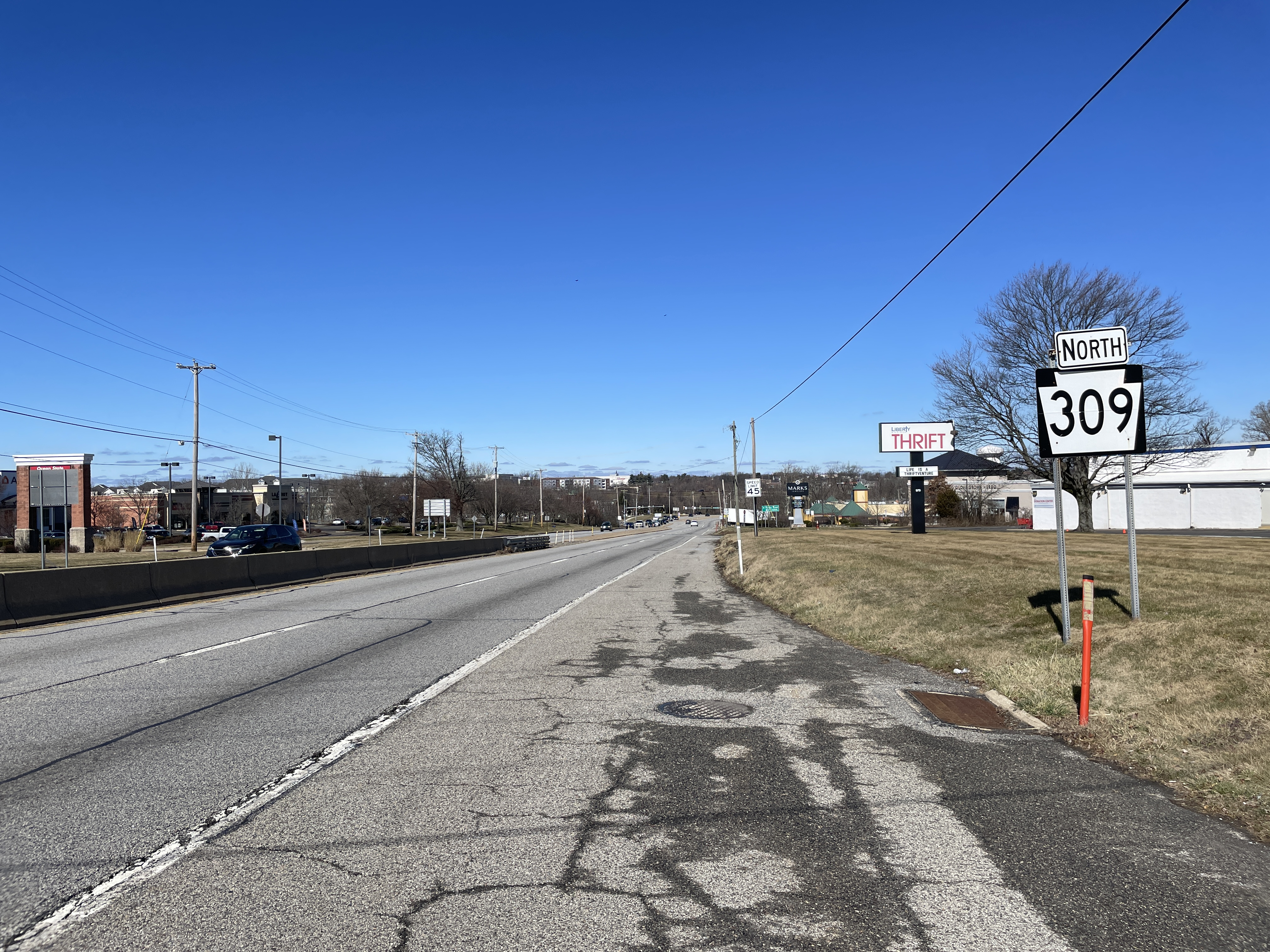
PA 309 northbound in Montgomery Township

In the 1940s, US 309 was shifted to a new alignment between Ashley and Tunkhannock. From Ashley, US 309 was realigned to head through Wilkes-Barre along newly-built Wilkes-Barre Township Boulevard, Spring Street, and Scott Street to PA 115, where it became concurrent with PA 115 along Kidder Street, Butler Street, Main Street, Courtright Street, and River Street to Pierce Street. From here US 309/PA 115 followed Pierce Street across the Susquehanna River to Kingston, where the two routes followed US 11 along Wyoming Avenue and then Union Street before continuing to Luzerne. Past Luzerne, US 309 split from PA 115 and followed the former alignment of PA 92 to Bowman Creek and the former alignment of PA 29 to US 6 in Tunkhannock. The former alignment of US 309 between Wilkes-Barre and Tunkhannock became an unnumbered road between Wilkes-Barre and Pittston and PA 92 between West Pittston and Tunkhannock. In 1948, US 309 was dedicated as the Joseph W. Hunter Highway in honor of the first highway commissioner in Pennsylvania. By 1950, US 309 was widened to a multilane road for a short stretch north of Philadelphia, along its new alignment between Ashley and Wilkes-Barre, between Luzerne and PA 415 in Dallas, and along the US 6 concurrency between PA 87 in Russel Hill and PA 267 in Meshoppen while PA 29 was widened to a multilane road between PA 895 in Snyders and PA 443, between US 209 in Tamaqua and Ginther, and between McAdoo and Audenried.

In the 1950s, US 309 was moved to a different alignment between Allentown and Hazleton. The route followed 7th Street and MacArthur Road before heading west along with US 22 on the Lehigh Valley Thruway to Fogelsville. From Fogelsville, US 309 turned north and replaced PA 100 between Fogelsville and Pleasant Corners and PA 29 between Pleasant Corners and Hazleton. The former alignment of US 309 between Allentown and Hazleton became an unnumbered road between Allentown and Walbert and a realigned PA 29 between Walbert and Hazleton; PA 29 between Walbert and Hazleton is now PA 309 between Walbert and Schnecksville, PA 873 between Schnecksville and Lehigh Gap, PA 248 between Lehigh Gap and Weissport, US 209 between Weissport and Nesquehoning, and PA 93 between Nesquehoning and Hazleton. The section of PA 29 between Schnecksville and Pleasant Corners became unnumbered following the realignment of PA 29. By 1960, US 309 was widened to a multilane road between Hazleton and Mountain Top, between PA 415 in Dallas and Kunkle, and along the US 6 concurrency between north of Tunkhannock and PA 87 in Russel Hill and was upgraded to a divided highway along the PA 443 concurrency south of Tamaqua, between PA 45 in Hometown and McAdoo, between Audenried and Hazleton, along multiple short stretches between Hazleton and Mountain Top, and between Mountain Top and Ashley, and for a stretch along the US 6 concurrency to the north of PA 87 in Russel Hill.

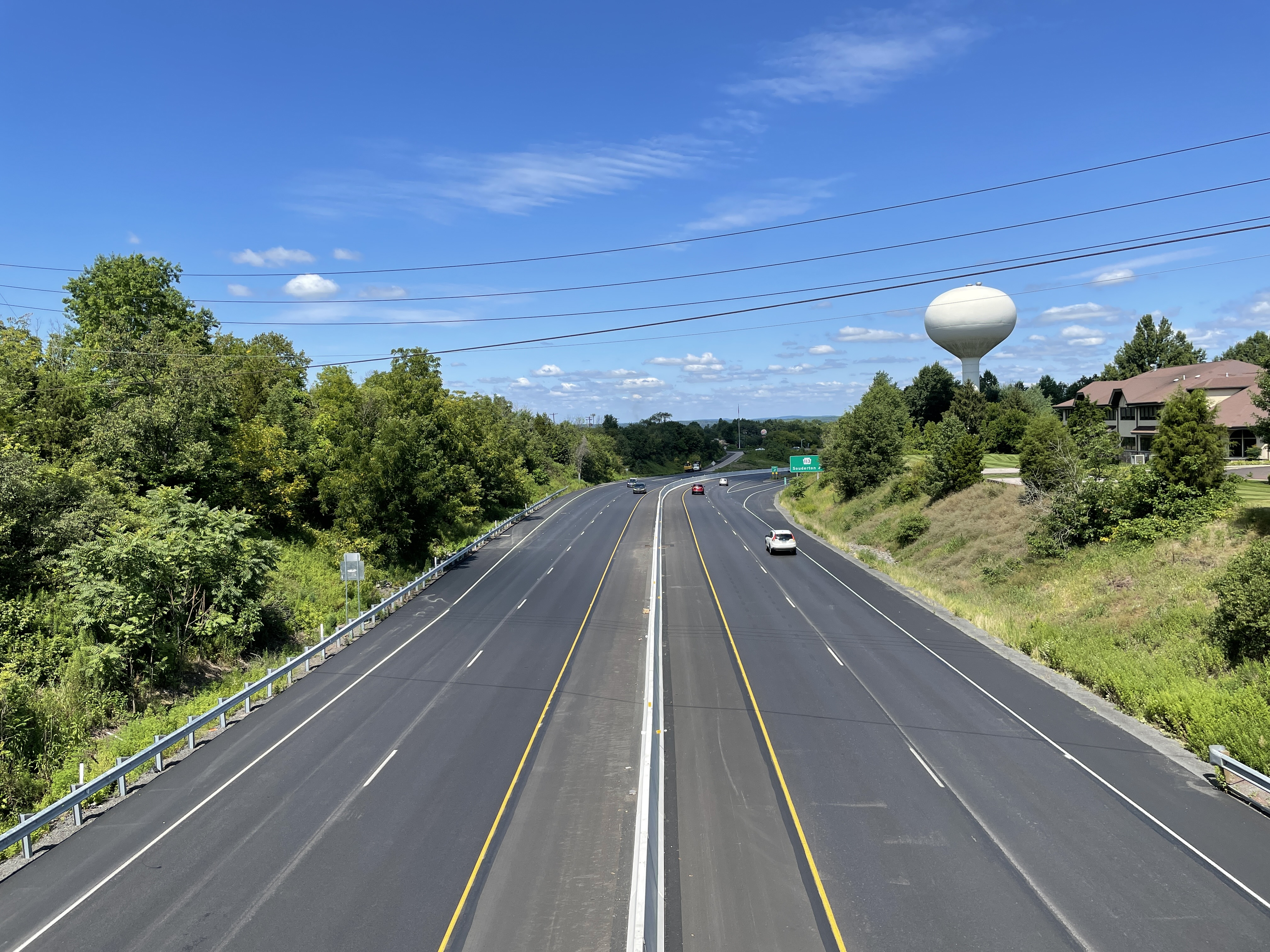
PA 309 northbound approaching its interchange with PA 113 in Hilltown Township

Planning for the route began in the late 1950s. North of Philadelphia, the Fort Washington Expressway from the PA 73 interchange to US 309 (Bethlehem Pike) north of Spring House was built in 1958; the rest of that freeway from PA 73 south to PA 152 in Wyncote was built in 1960. Upon completion of Fort Washington Expressway, US 309 was rerouted to follow Fort Washington Expressway before continuing south along Ogontz Avenue and Stenton Avenue to end at US 611 (now PA 611) at Broad Street in North Philadelphia; US 309 replaced the PA 152 designation along Ogontz Avenue and Stenton Avenue. There were plans made by the Philadelphia City Planning Commission from the late 1940s until the mid 1970s to extend the Fort Washington Expressway south to Center City Philadelphia. The freeway was planned to continue south from its current terminus in Wyncote into Philadelphia and intersect US 1 (Roosevelt Expressway) before terminating at a proposed Girard Avenue Expressway. In 1969, it was estimated the freeway between Wyncote and US 1 would cost $50 million and be completed by 1975 while the freeway between US 1 and the Girard Avenue Expressway would cost $44 million and be completed by 1985. The southern extension of the Fort Washington Expressway was never built due to rising construction costs and community opposition.

On July 1, 1977, the Pennsylvania Department of Transportation (PennDOT) halted spending on proposed highway projects, and the Fort Washington Expressway extension was removed from plans by the Philadelphia City Planning Commission. There were also plans to extend the Fort Washington Expressway northwest and connect to the Pennsylvania Turnpike Northeast Extension before the freeway would continue northeast and connect to the southern terminus of the Sellersville Bypass. In 1983, a scaled-down proposal called for the Fort Washington Expressway to be extended north and end at the Pennsylvania Turnpike Northeast Extension near Lansdale. Interchanges along this proposed extension were to be located at Bethlehem Pike, North Wales Road, PA 63, and PA 463.

A freeway bypass of to the west of Allentown from US 309 in Lanark to US 22 near Walbert was built in 1958. Upon completion of this bypass, US 309 was rerouted to follow it from Lanark north to US 22, PA 29 was designated onto the bypass north of Cedar Crest Boulevard and continued north as a divided highway to north of Walbert, and US 222 was designated onto the bypass from Hamilton Boulevard to its terminus at US 22. The former alignment of US 309 through Allentown became unnumbered until it was designated as a southern extension of PA 145 in 1986. On June 18, 1962, AASHO approved the realignment of US 309 to the modern-day alignment of PA 309 between US 22 near Allentown and Pleasant Corners, following PA 29 between Allentown and the intersection with present-day PA 873 in Schnecksville before heading west between Schnecksville and Pleasant Corners. PA 100 was extended north from Fogelsville to Pleasant Corners along the former alignment of US 309. The concurrent PA 29 designation was removed from US 309 between Allentown and Schnecksville in 1966. US 222 was also removed from US 309 in the 1960s.

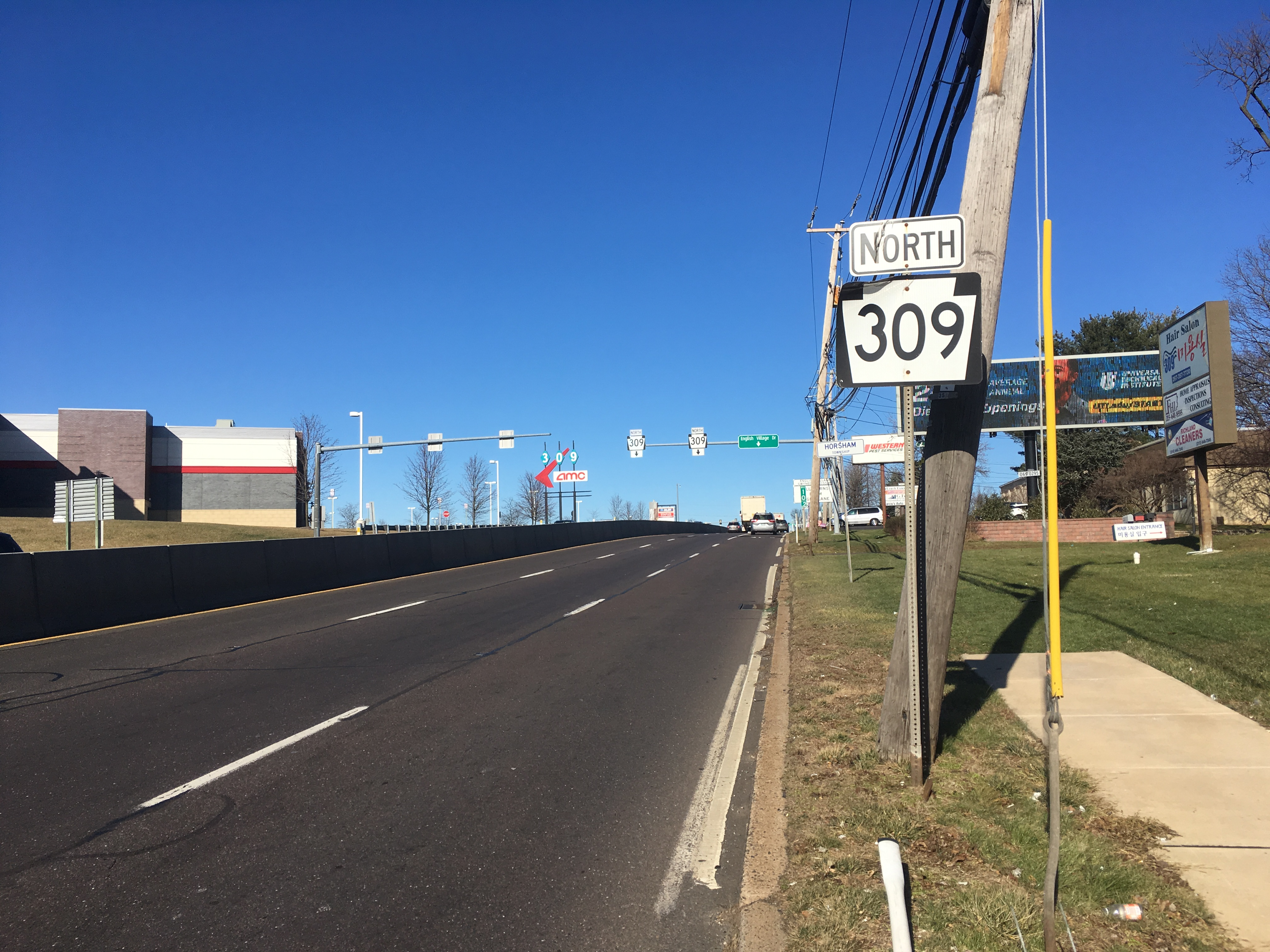
PA 309 northbound past PA 63 in Horsham Township

The north end of US 309 between Tunkhannock and Waverly, New York, had always been shared with other U.S. Highways (US 6 and US 220). On June 19, 1963, AASHO approved the removal of the US 309 designation between US 6 in Tunkhannock and the New York border, eliminating the concurrencies with US 6 and US 220. This truncation left the northern terminus of US 309 at US 6 in Tunkhannock. As a result of this, the route was entirely located in Pennsylvania and no longer met the U.S. Highway standards set forth by AASHO, which discourages routes within a single state. On October 14, 1967, AASHO approved the elimination of the US 309 designation. US 309 was decommissioned in February 1968 and was replaced by PA 309. Signs were changed by the end of the month. In 1967, work began on a freeway for US 309 to bypass Sellersville from just north of the border between Montgomery and Bucks counties to just south of Quakertown. This bypass opened in 1969 as part of PA 309. By 1970, PA 309 was upgraded to a divided highway between the north end of the Fort Washington Expressway and US 202 (Dekalb Pike) in Montgomeryville, US 202/PA 463 in Montgomeryville and the south end of the Sellersville Bypass, the north end of the Sellersville Bypass and the south end of the freeway bypass of Allentown in Lanark, and Luzerne and PA 415 in Dallas.

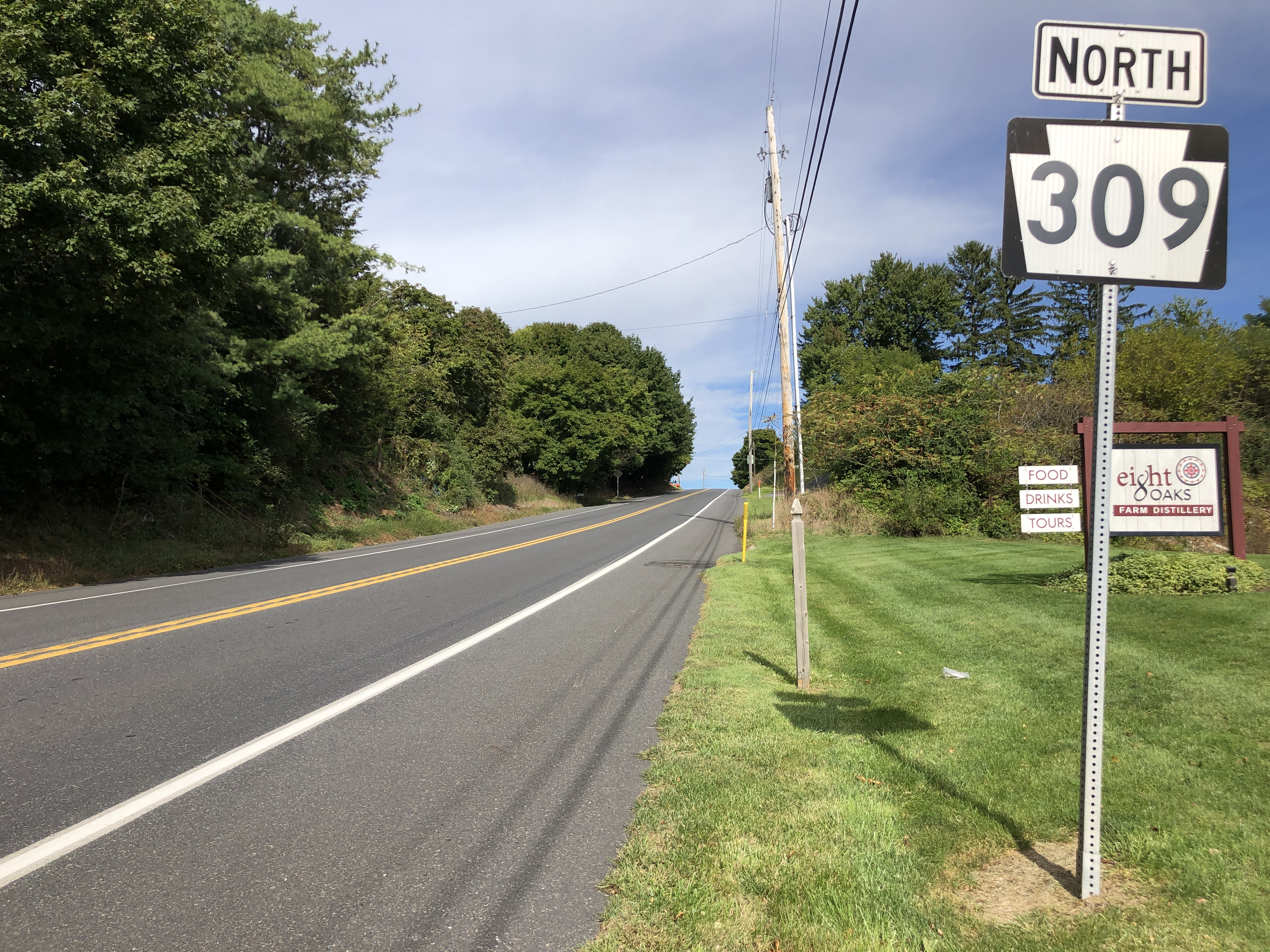
PA 309 northbound in Lynn Township

By 1980, PA 309 was realigned through the Wilkes-Barre area to follow PA 315 along Blackman Street, Hazle Avenue, Park Avenue, South Street, River Street, Market Street, and US 11; an extended PA 315 was designated onto the former portion of PA 309 along Wilkes-Barre Township Boulevard, Spring Street, and Scott Street while an extended PA 115 was designated onto the former portion of PA 309 along Kidder Street, Butler Street, Main Street, Courtright Street, River Street, and Pierce Street. By 1989, the northern terminus of PA 309 was cut back from US 6 in Tunkhannock to its current location, eliminating the concurrency with PA 29 between Bowman Creek and Tunkhannock. Also by this time, PA 309 was rerouted to follow Cheltenham Avenue to reach its current southern terminus at PA 611 instead of following Ogontz Avenue and Stenton Avenue to PA 611. By 1989, PA 309 was upgraded to a divided highway along the concurrency with US 202 (now US 202 Bus.) in Montgomeryville. In 1989, the PA 309 freeway bypass of Allentown between Lanark and north of US 222 became part of I-78.

On June 21, 1960, plans were announced to construct the North Cross Valley Expressway to link the Back Mountain region to I-81 in Luzerne County. Construction on the highway began in 1964. The North Cross Valley Expressway was built in stages. The section of the highway from River Street in Plains Township across the Susquehanna River to Rutter Avenue in Kingston was constructed in 1976 and opened in 1977. The section of the North Cross Valley Expressway between Rutter Avenue in Kingston and PA 309 in Luzerne was constructed in 1980. During construction of this section in 1979, a coal vein was discovered. In 1982, construction began to complete the bridge linking the terminus of the expressway at River Street to Conyngham Avenue. By 1989, PA 309 was rerouted to follow Wilkes-Barre Township Boulevard, Spring Street, Scott Street, Kidder Street, Conyngham Avenue, Wilkes-Barre Boulevard, and the North Cross Valley Expressway through the Wilkes-Barre area; the route replaced the PA 315 designation along Wilkes-Barre Township Boulevard, Spring Street, and Scott Street and the PA 115 designation along Kidder Street. The remaining section of the North Cross Valley Expressway from Wilkes-Barre Boulevard to I-81 was completed on November 9, 1991, with Governor Robert P. Casey in attendance for a ribbon-cutting ceremony. Construction of the highway cost $100 million. Upon the completion of the final section of the North Cross Valley Expressway, PA 309 was rerouted to follow I-81 and the North Cross Valley Expressway through the Wilkes-Barre area, while PA 309 Bus. was designated onto the former alignment of PA 309 along Wilkes-Barre Township Boulevard, Spring Street, and Scott Street and replaced PA 115 along Kidder Street between Scott Street and the interchange with the North Cross Valley Expressway.

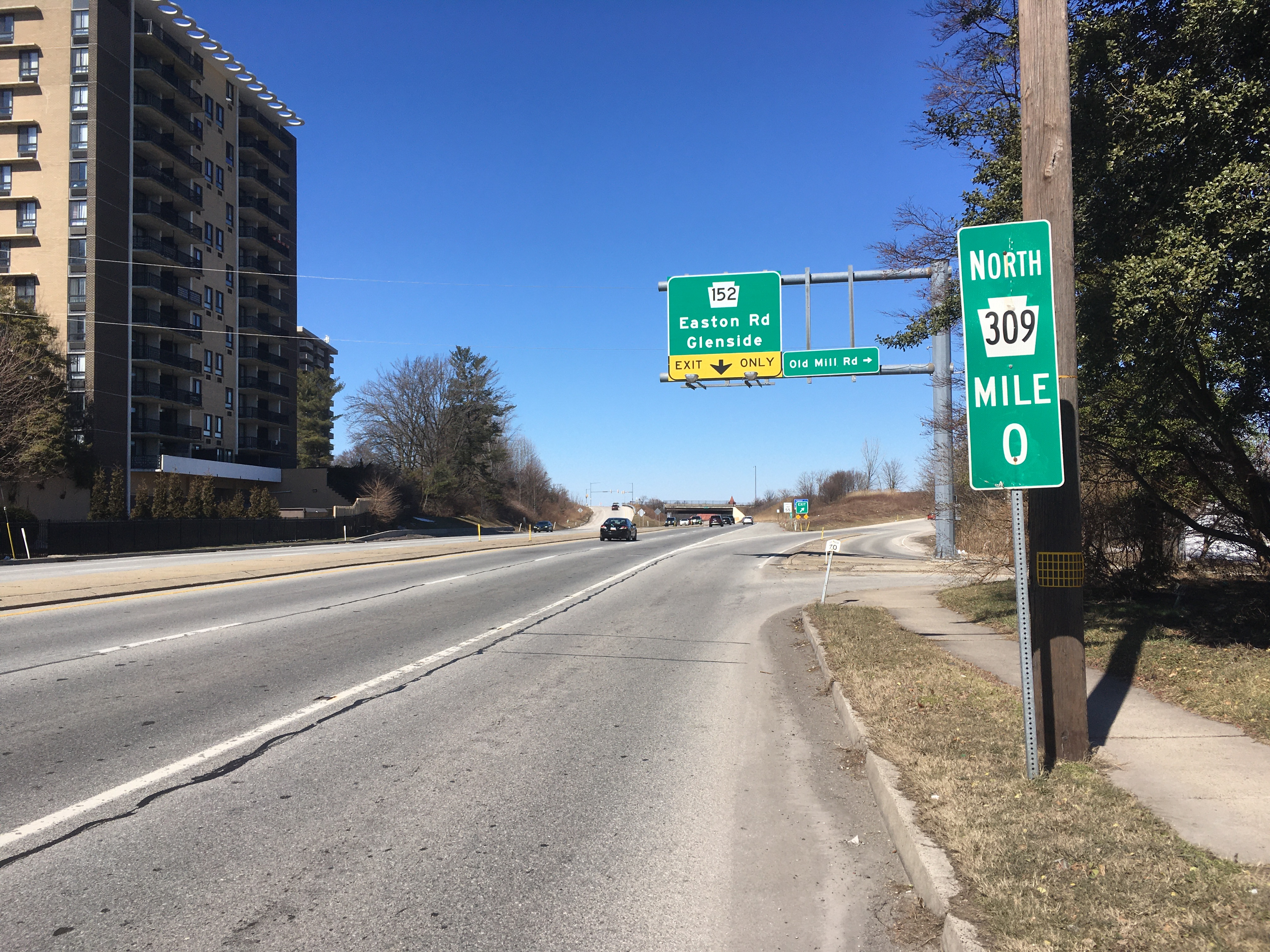
PA 309 northbound at southern terminus of the Fort Washington Expressway at the PA 152 exit in Cheltenham Township

PennDOT undertook a $375 million project to reconstruct and improve the section of PA 309 running along the Fort Washington Expressway between Cheltenham Avenue and PA 63 in Montgomery County. The project rebuilt the roadway and shoulders, reconstructed bridges, improved ramps at interchanges, and constructed sound walls. The interchanges with PA 152 and the Pennsylvania Turnpike (I-276) and Pennsylvania Avenue were completely reconstructed and reconfigured while a southbound exit and northbound entrance were added at the Norristown Road interchange. As part of the reconstruction of the interchange between PA 309 and the Pennsylvania Turnpike (I-276) and Pennsylvania Avenue, Pennsylvania Avenue was extended as a two-way road between Fort Washington and Oreland, with traffic between the two communities no longer having to travel along PA 309 between the two sections of Pennsylvania Avenue. The section of the highway between PA 73 and Highland Avenue was reconstructed between February 2004 and November 2006. The interchange between PA 309 and the Pennsylvania Turnpike (I-276) and Pennsylvania Avenue in Fort Washington was reconstructed between January 2005 and November 2008. The portion of the highway between Cheltenham Avenue and PA 73 was rebuilt between March 2005 and November 2008. The section of PA 309 between Highland Avenue and PA 63 was reconstructed between July 2007 and early 2011. The new ramps at the Norristown Road interchange opened on December 20, 2010.

On November 11, 2019, work began on a project to improve the section of PA 309 along the Sellersville Bypass in Bucks County by rehabilitating pavement and reconstructing structures. Construction on this improvement project was completed in 2023.

There are plans to convert the intersection with West Saucon Valley Road/Center Valley Parkway in Upper Saucon Township into an interchange. Construction is planned to begin in the later part of 2026, with completion expected in 2030.

== Major intersections ==
County	Location	mi	km	Exit	Destinations	Notes
Philadelphia–Montgomery county line	Philadelphia–Cheltenham Township line	0.000	0.000		Cheltenham Avenue west	Continuation west
Philadelphia–Montgomery county line	Philadelphia–Cheltenham Township line	0.000	0.000		PA 611	Interchange
Montgomery	Cheltenham Township	2.143	3.449	Southern end of freeway section		
Montgomery	Cheltenham Township	2.395	3.854		PA 152 north (Easton Road) – Glenside	Southern terminus of PA 152; access to Arcadia University and Mount Airy
Montgomery	Springfield Township	4.327	6.964		Paper Mill Road – Springfield	Access to Chestnut Hill College
Montgomery	Springfield Township	5.187	8.348		PA 73 – Flourtown	
Montgomery	Upper Dublin Township	6.677	10.746		I-276 Toll / Penna Turnpike – Fort Washington, Oreland, New Jersey, Harrisburg	Exit 339 (Fort Washington) on I-276 / Penna Turnpike; access to Fort Washington/Oreland via Pennsylvania Avenue; Oreland not signed northbound
Montgomery	Upper Dublin Township	7.738	12.453		Highland Avenue	Northbound exit and southbound entrance
Montgomery	Upper Dublin Township	8.693	13.990		Susquehanna Road	Northbound exit and southbound entrance; access to Temple University Ambler Campus
Montgomery	Upper Dublin Township	9.090	14.629		Butler Pike – Ambler	Southbound exit and northbound entrance
Montgomery	Lower Gwynedd Township	10.167	16.362		Norristown Road – Spring House	Access to Gwynedd Mercy University
Montgomery	Lower Gwynedd Township	11.829	19.037		Bethlehem Pike	Southbound exit and northbound entrance
Montgomery	Lower Gwynedd Township	11.829	19.037	Northern end of freeway section		
Montgomery	Lower Gwynedd–Horsham township line	12.257	19.726		PA 63 (Welsh Road)	
Montgomery	Montgomery Township	14.211	22.870		US 202 – Norristown, Doylestown	Interchange
Montgomery	Montgomery Township	14.460	23.271		US 202 Bus. south (Dekalb Pike) – Norristown	Southern end of US 202 Bus. concurrency
Montgomery	Montgomery Township	15.337	24.683		US 202 Bus. north (Doylestown Road) – Doylestown; PA 463 (Cowpath Road / Horsham Road) – Lansdale	Northern end of US 202 Bus. concurrency
Montgomery–Bucks county line	Hatfield–Hilltown township line	19.943	32.095	Southern end of freeway section		
Montgomery–Bucks county line	Hatfield–Hilltown township line	19.943	32.095		Bergey Road / Bethlehem Pike	No northbound entrance
Bucks	Hilltown Township	21.521	34.635		PA 113 – Souderton	
Bucks	West Rockhill Township	23.414	37.681		PA 152 south – Telford, Sellersville	Northern terminus of PA 152
Bucks	West Rockhill Township	25.382	40.848		To PA 563 – Perkasie	Access via Lawn Avenue
Bucks	West Rockhill Township	28.338	45.606		Sellersville, Perkasie	Southbound exit and northbound entrance; access via Bethlehem Pike
Bucks	West Rockhill Township	28.338	45.606	Northern end of freeway section		
Bucks	Quakertown	31.234	50.266		PA 313 east / PA 663 south to Penna Turnpike NE Extension – Pennsburg, Quakertown	Northern terminus of PA 663; western terminus of PA 313
Lehigh	Upper Saucon Township	37.583	60.484		PA 378 north – Bethlehem	Southern terminus of PA 378; former PA 191
Lehigh	Upper Saucon Township	40.528	65.223	Southern end of freeway section		
Lehigh	Upper Saucon Township	40.528– 40.955	65.223– 65.911		PA 145 north to South 4th Street	Northbound exit and southbound entrance; southern terminus of PA 145
Lehigh	Upper Saucon Township	40.528– 40.955	65.223– 65.911	60	I-78 east – Bethlehem	Southern end of I-78 concurrency; exit number not signed northbound
Lehigh	Upper Saucon Township	41.139	66.207	59	To PA 145 – Summit Lawn	Southbound exit and northbound entrance; access via Rock Road
Lehigh	Allentown	42.527	68.441	58	Emaus Avenue south	Northbound exit only
Lehigh	Allentown	43.005	69.210	57	Lehigh Street	
Lehigh	Salisbury Township	44.814	72.121	55	PA 29 south (Cedar Crest Boulevard)	Northern terminus of PA 29
Lehigh	Lower Macungie–South Whitehall township line	45.966	73.975	54	US 222 south / PA 222 north (Hamilton Boulevard)	Signed as exits 54A (south) and 54B (north) northbound; northern terminus of US 222; southern terminus of PA 222; access to Reading, Allentown Center City, and Dorney Park & Wildwater Kingdom
Lehigh	Lower Macungie Township	46.591	74.981	53	I-78 west – Harrisburg	Northbound exit and southbound entrance; northern end of I-78 concurrency
Lehigh	South Whitehall Township	47.530	76.492		Tilghman Street	Former US 22
Lehigh	South Whitehall Township	48.275	77.691		US 22 – Bethlehem, Allentown, Harrisburg	Signed for Bethlehem northbound, Allentown southbound
Lehigh	South Whitehall Township	48.366	77.838	Northern end of freeway section		
Lehigh	North Whitehall Township	54.244	87.297		PA 873 north – Slatington	Southern terminus of PA 873
Lehigh	Heidelberg Township	59.038	95.012		PA 100 south – Fogelsville	Northern terminus of PA 100
Lehigh	Lynn Township	61.614	99.158		PA 143 south – New Tripoli, Lenhartsville	Northern terminus of PA 143
Schuylkill	West Penn Township	69.430	111.737		PA 895 (Lizard Creek Road) – New Ringgold, Bowmanstown	
Schuylkill	West Penn Township	73.987	119.071		PA 443 east – Lehighton, Jim Thorpe	Southern end of PA 443 concurrency
Schuylkill	West Penn Township	74.975	120.661		PA 443 west (Clamtown Road) – New Ringgold, Orwigsburg	Northern end of PA 443 concurrency
Schuylkill	Tamaqua	78.105	125.698		US 209 (Broad Street) – Pottsville, Coaldale, Lansford	
Schuylkill	Rush Township	80.141	128.974		PA 54 (Mahanoy Avenue / Lafayette Avenue) – Mahanoy City, Jim Thorpe	
Schuylkill	Kline Township	84.705	136.319		I-81 – Hazleton, Harrisburg	Exit 138 on I-81
Carbon	No major junctions					
Luzerne	Hazle Township	88.308	142.118		PA 424 (Arthur Gardner Highway) to I-81 / PA 93 – Hazleton Commerce Center	
Luzerne	Hazleton	90.192	145.150		PA 93 (Broad Street)	
Luzerne	Hazleton	91.148	146.688		PA 924 south (15th Street)	Northern terminus of PA 924
Luzerne	Hazleton	91.527	147.298		PA 940 east (West 22nd Street)	Western terminus of PA 940
Luzerne	Butler Township	98.111– 98.130	157.894– 157.925		I-80 – Bloomsburg, Stroudsburg	Exit 262 on I-80
Luzerne	Fairview Township	107.993	173.798		PA 437 south (Woodlawn Avenue) – Glen Summit, White Haven	Northern terminus of PA 437
Luzerne	Wilkes-Barre Township	110.979	178.603	Southern end of freeway section		
Luzerne	Wilkes-Barre Township	110.979	178.603	165	PA 309 Bus. north I-81 south – Nanticoke, Hazleton, Wilkes-Barre	Southern terminus of PA 309 Bus.; southern end of I-81 concurrency
Luzerne	Wilkes-Barre Township	113.986	183.443	168	Highland Park Boulevard – Wilkes-Barre	Access to Mohegan Sun Arena
Luzerne	Plains Township	115.962	186.623	170	I-81 north / PA 115 south – Scranton, Bear Creek	Northern end of I-81 concurrency; northern terminus of PA 115; signed as exits 170A (south) and 170B (north); exit nos. not signed southbound
Luzerne	Wilkes-Barre	116.700	187.810	1	PA 315 north / PA 309 Bus. south – Wilkes-Barre, Dupont	Southern terminus of PA 315; northern terminus of PA 309 Bus.; access to I-81 south
Luzerne	Wilkes-Barre	117.904	189.748	2	Wilkes-Barre Center City	Access via North Wilkes-Barre Boulevard
Luzerne	Plains Township	118.641	190.934	3	Wilkes-Barre, Plains	Access via South River Street; access to King's College and Wilkes University
Luzerne	Kingston	119.450	192.236	4	To US 11 – Kingston, Forty Fort	Northbound exit and southbound entrance; access via Rutter Avenue
Luzerne	Kingston	119.829	192.846	5	US 11 – Forty Fort, Kingston	Southbound exit and northbound entrance
Luzerne	Pringle	120.484	193.900	6	Luzerne	Northbound exit and southbound entrance; access via Union Street
Luzerne	Luzerne	121.295	195.205	6	Luzerne	Southbound exit and northbound entrance; access via Main Street
Luzerne	Luzerne	121.389	195.357	Northern end of freeway section		
Luzerne	Dallas	125.816	202.481		PA 415 north (Memorial Highway) to PA 118	Southern terminus of PA 415
Wyoming	Monroe Township	134.043	215.721		PA 29	Northern terminus
1.000 mi = 1.609 km; 1.000 km = 0.621 mi: Concurrency terminus; Electronic toll collection; Incomplete access

== Special routes ==
=== PA 309 Truck (Montgomery County) ===
Pennsylvania Route 309 Truck
- Location: Montgomery County
- Length: 4.6 mi (7.4 km)

Pennsylvania Route 309 Truck (PA 309 Truck) is a connector truck route that provides access from PA 63 and Interstate 476 at the Lansdale interchange to the Sellersville Bypass near Souderton. It follows Wambold Road and East Township Line Road through portions of central Montgomery County, Pennsylvania. In the opposite direction, the route is signed I-476 Truck. Signs were posted in 2025.

=== PA 309 Truck (Quakertown) ===
Pennsylvania Route 309 Truck
- Location: Quakertown
- Length: 2.5 mi (4.0 km)

Pennsylvania Route 309 Truck (PA 309 Truck) is a truck route that provides access from PA 212 to PA 309, bypassing Quakertown to the north. The truck route follows East Pumping Station Road, California Road, and West Pumping Station Road.

=== PA 309 Business ===
Pennsylvania Route 309 Business
- Location: Wilkes-Barre
- Length: 4.649 mi (7.482 km)
- Existed: 1991–present

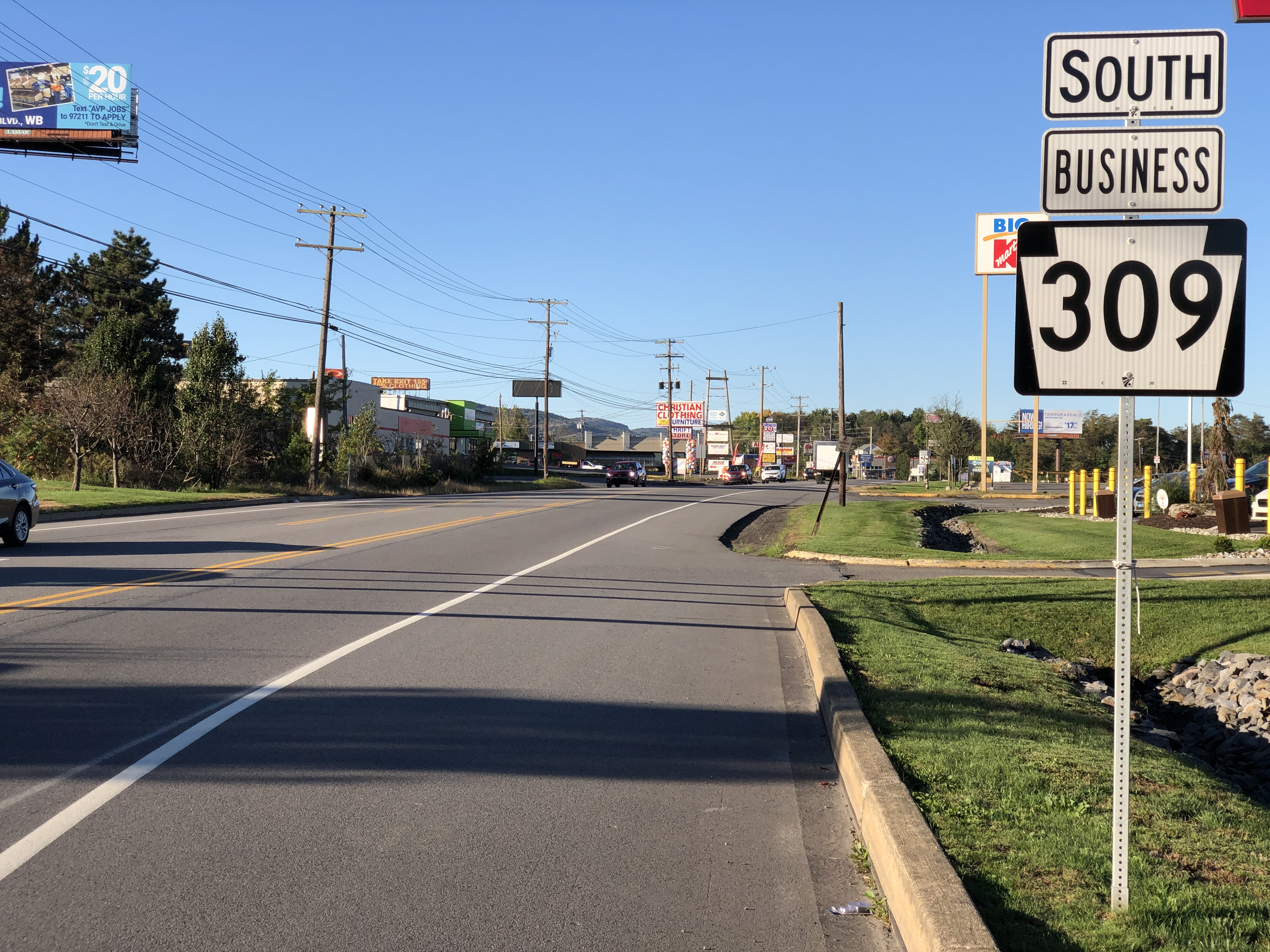
PA 309 Bus. southbound in Wilkes-Barre Township

Pennsylvania Route 309 Business (PA 309 Bus.) is a 4.6-mile (7.4 km) business route of PA 309 that runs through the Wilkes-Barre area in Luzerne County. PA 309 Bus. begins at an interchange with I-81 and PA 309 in Ashley, heading northeast on four-lane divided Wilkes-Barre Township Boulevard. Within this interchange, the business route crosses into Hanover Township before entering Wilkes-Barre Township. The road runs past businesses and transitions into a three-lane road with a center left-turn lane, with I-81/PA 309 parallel a short distance to the southeast. At the Casey Avenue intersection, the roadway passes northwest of a park and ride lot. PA 309 Bus. runs through woodland and development before it narrows to two lanes and comes to an interchange with East Northampton Street northwest of Georgetown. At this point, the business route forms the border between Wilkes-Barre to the northwest and Wilkes-Barre Township to the southeast, widening into a four-lane divided highway and running past businesses. The road becomes undivided and bends to the north, fully entering Wilkes-Barre and narrowing to two lanes. PA 309 Bus. turns into Spring Street and curves east, becoming lined with homes. The road heads northeast and widens to four lanes, running past commercial development. The business route becomes Scott Street before it turns east onto four-lane divided Kidder Street. The road runs past more businesses and briefly reenters Wilkes-Barre Township before heading back into Wilkes-Barre and passing to the north of the Wyoming Valley Mall. PA 309 Bus. comes to its northern terminus at a partial cloverleaf interchange with the PA 309 freeway, where the road continues northeast as PA 315. PA 309 Bus. was designated in 1991 after PA 309 was realigned to run through the Wilkes-Barre area on I-81 and the North Cross Valley Expressway. PA 309 Bus. replaced PA 309 along Wilkes-Barre Township Boulevard, Spring Street, and Scott Street and PA 115 along Kidder Street.

Major intersections
The entire route is in Luzerne County.

Location	mi	km	Destinations	Notes
Wilkes-Barre Township	0.000	0.000	I-81 / PA 309 – Nanticoke, Hazleton, Scranton, Mountain Top	Southern terminus; exit 165B on I-81
Wilkes-Barre Township	1.889	3.040	Wilkes-Barre, Laurel Run	Interchange; access via East Northampton Street
Wilkes-Barre	4.649	7.482	PA 309 to I-81 south / PA 115 – Forty Fort, Dallas	Exit 1 on PA 309
Wilkes-Barre	4.649	7.482	PA 315 north – Dupont	Continuation north
1.000 mi = 1.609 km; 1.000 km = 0.621 mi

=== Former US 309 Truck ===
U.S. Route 309 Truck
- Location: Philadelphia

U.S. Route 309 Truck (US 309 Truck) was a truck bypass of the section of US 309 that ran along Lincoln Drive in Philadelphia. US 309 Truck began at US 1 Byp./US 13 Byp. (Hunting Park Avenue) and headed northwest on Germantown Avenue. The truck route ended at US 309, US 422, and US 611 Alt. at the intersection of Germantown Avenue, Mt. Airy Avenue, and Chew Avenue, at which point Germantown Avenue continued northwest as US 309/US 422. US 309 Truck was designated by 1950. The truck route was decommissioned in the 1950s, being replaced with US 422 Alt. north of Washington Lane.

Major intersections

The entire route was in Philadelphia, Philadelphia County.

mi	km	Destinations	Notes
		US 1 Byp. / US 13 Byp. (Hunting Park Avenue)	Southern terminus
		US 309 (Allens Lane) / US 422 (Chew Avenue / Germantown Avenue) / US 611 Alt. north (Mt. Airy Avenue)	Northern terminus; southern terminus of US 611 Alt.
1.000 mi = 1.609 km; 1.000 km = 0.621 mi

=== Former US 309 Bypass ===
U.S. Route 309 Bypass
- Location: Allentown

U.S. Route 309 Bypass (US 309 Byp.) was a bypass of a portion of US 309 in the northern section of Allentown The route began at US 22/US 309 (Tilghman Street), heading north of 12th Street briefly before turning northwest onto Roth Avenue. US 309 Byp. ended at US 309 at the intersection of 19th Street and Main Boulevard. US 309 Byp. was designated by 1940. The bypass route was decommissioned in the 1950s.

Major intersections

The entire route was in Allentown, Lehigh County.

mi	km	Destinations	Notes
		US 22 / US 309 (Tilghman Street)	Southern terminus
		US 309 (19th Street/Main Boulevard)	Northern terminus
1.000 mi = 1.609 km; 1.000 km = 0.621 mi
