= Monroe Township, Wyoming County, Pennsylvania =

Township in Pennsylvania, US

Monroe Township
- Township
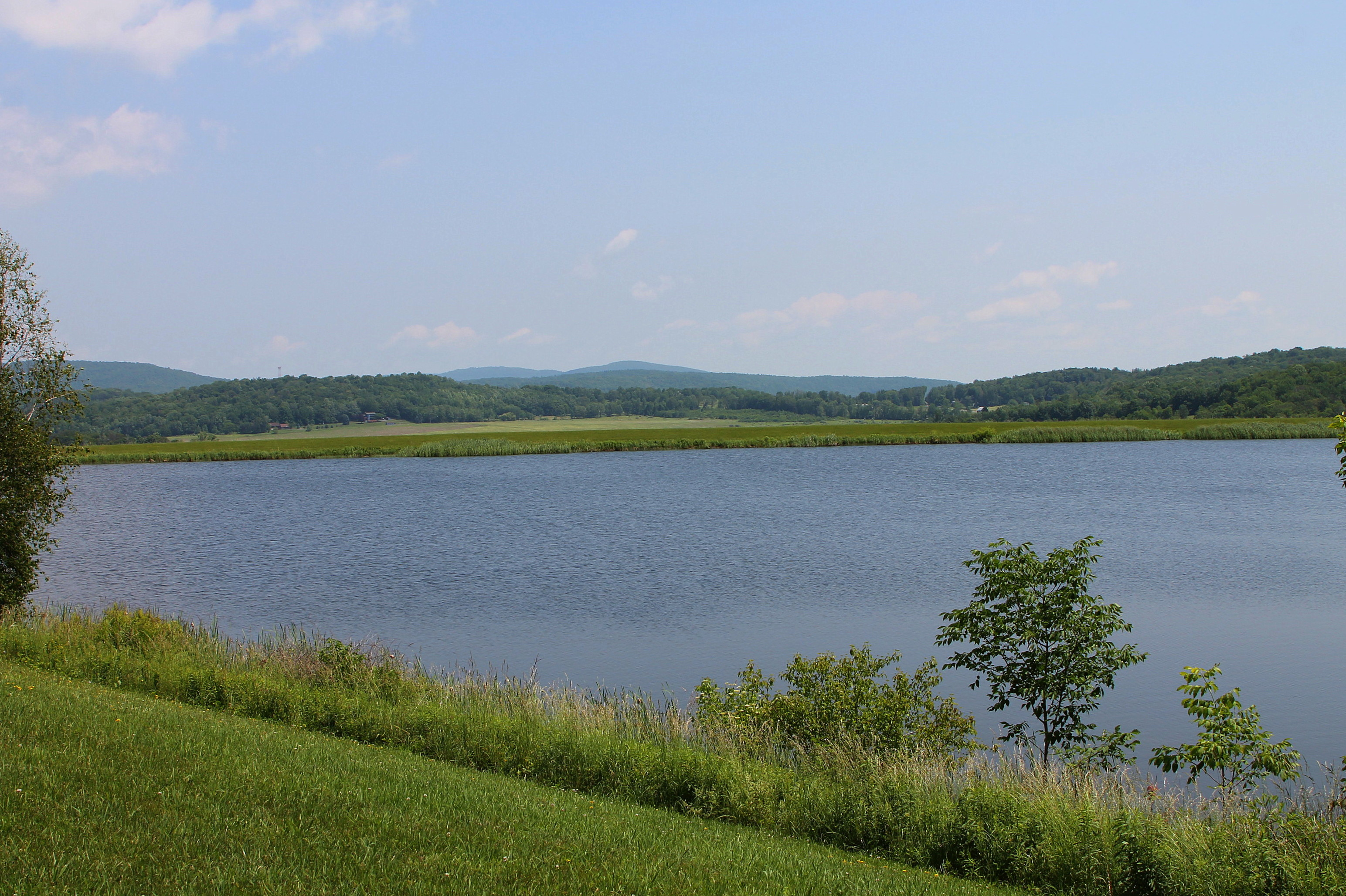
- Lake and mountains in Monroe Township

- Location of Pennsylvania in the United States
- Coordinates: 41°25′00″N 76°00′59″W
- Country: United States
- State: Pennsylvania
- County: Wyoming

Area
  - Total: 21.27 sq mi (55.10 km^{2})
  - Land: 21.19 sq mi (54.88 km^{2})
  - Water: 0.085 sq mi (0.22 km^{2})
- Elevation: 1,155 ft (352 m)

Population (2020)
  - Total: 1,665 ▲
  - Estimate (2021): 1,660
  - Density: 75.7/sq mi (29.23/km^{2})
- Time zone: UTC-5 (EST)
  - Summer (DST): UTC-4 (EDT)
- Area code: 570
- FIPS code: 42-131-50496

Monroe Township is a township that is located in Wyoming County, Pennsylvania, United States. The population was 1,665 at the time of the 2020 census.

== Geography ==
According to the United States Census Bureau, the township has a total area of 21.3 square miles (55 km^{2}), of which 21.2 square miles (55 km^{2}) is land and 0.1 square miles (0.26 km^{2}) (0.47%) is water.

== Demographics ==
Historical population
Census	Pop.	Note	%±
2010	1,652		—
2020	1,665		0.8%
2021 (est.)	1,660		−0.3%
U.S. Decennial Census

As of the census of 2010, there were 1,652 people, 674 households, and 466 families residing in the township.

The population density was 77.9 inhabitants per square mile (30.1/km^{2}). There were 732 housing units at an average density of 34.5 units per square mile (13.3 units/km^{2}).

The racial makeup of the township was 98.4% White, 0.7% African American, 0.2% Asian, 0.05% from other races, and 0.65% from two or more races. Hispanic or Latino of any race were 1% of the population.

There were 674 households, out of which 28.2% had children under the age of eighteen living with them; 51.6% were married couples living together, 11.3% had a female householder with no husband present, and 30.9% were non-families. while 25.2% of all households were made up of individuals, and 8.4% had someone living alone who was sixty-five years of age or older.

The average household size was 2.45 and the average family size was 2.86.

Within the township, the population was spread out, with 20.4% of residents who were under the age of eighteen, 63.7% who were aged eighteen to sixty-four, and 15.9% who were sixty-five years of age or older. The median age was forty-three years.

The median income for a household in the township was $43,625, and the median income for a family was $50,263. Males had a median income of $43,482 compared with that of $30,236 for females.

The per capita income for the township was $23,421.

Approximately 6.4% of families and 9% of the population were living below the poverty line, including 12.8% of those who were under the age of eighteen and 12.3% of those who were aged sixty-five or older.

== Gallery ==
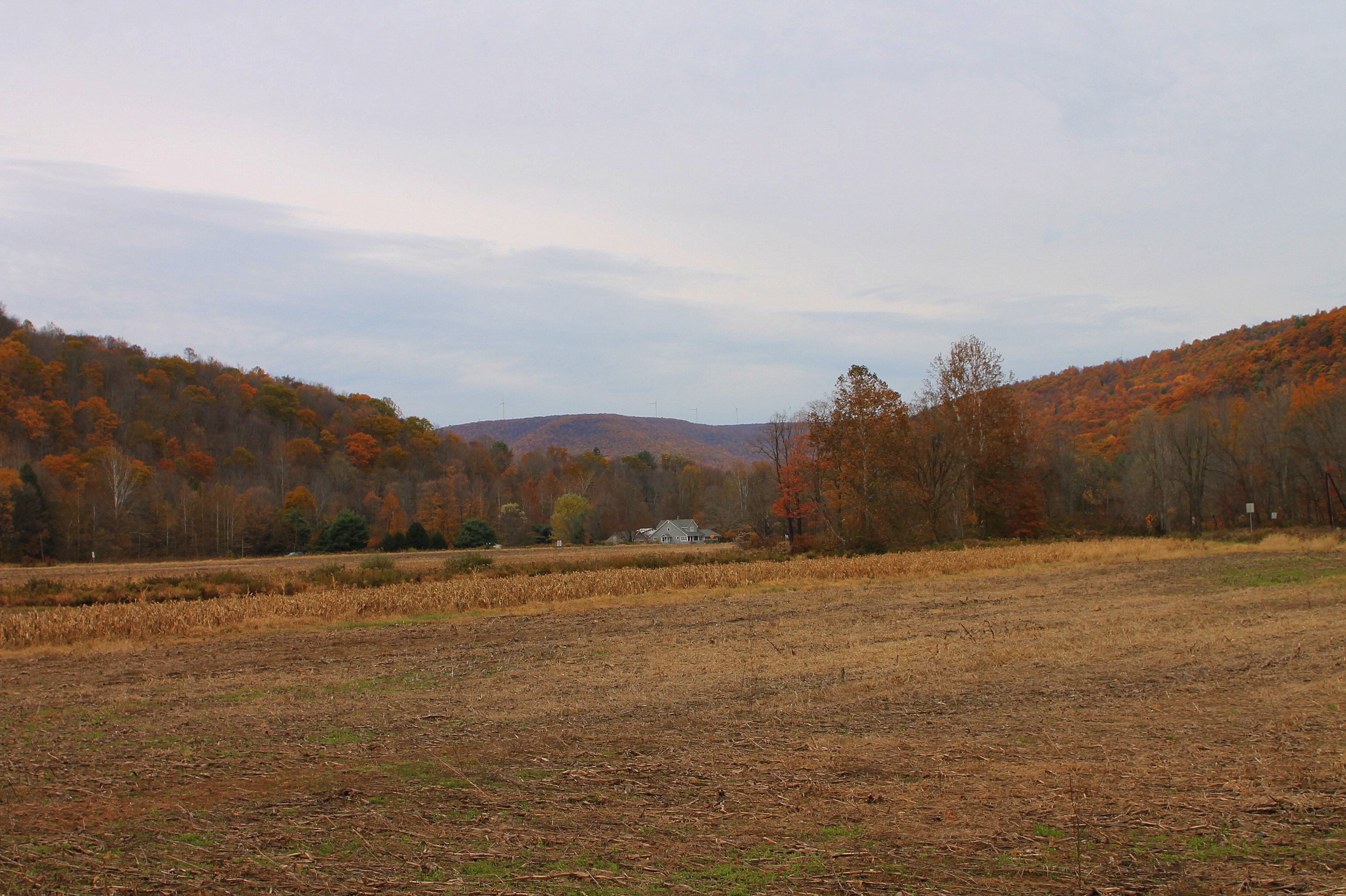
Fall scenery viewed from Lutes Corner Road

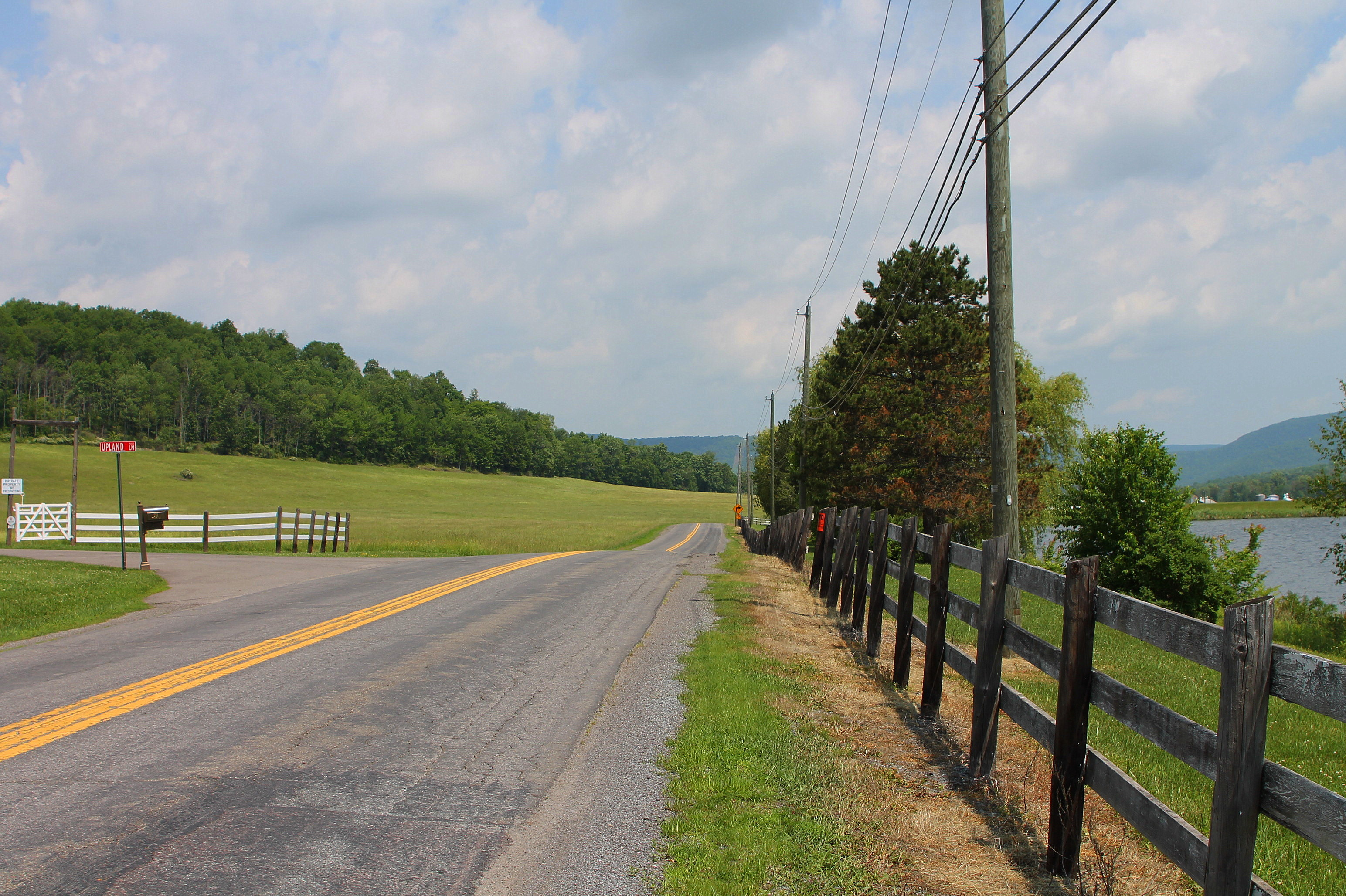
Buckwheat Hollow Road looking north in Monroe Township

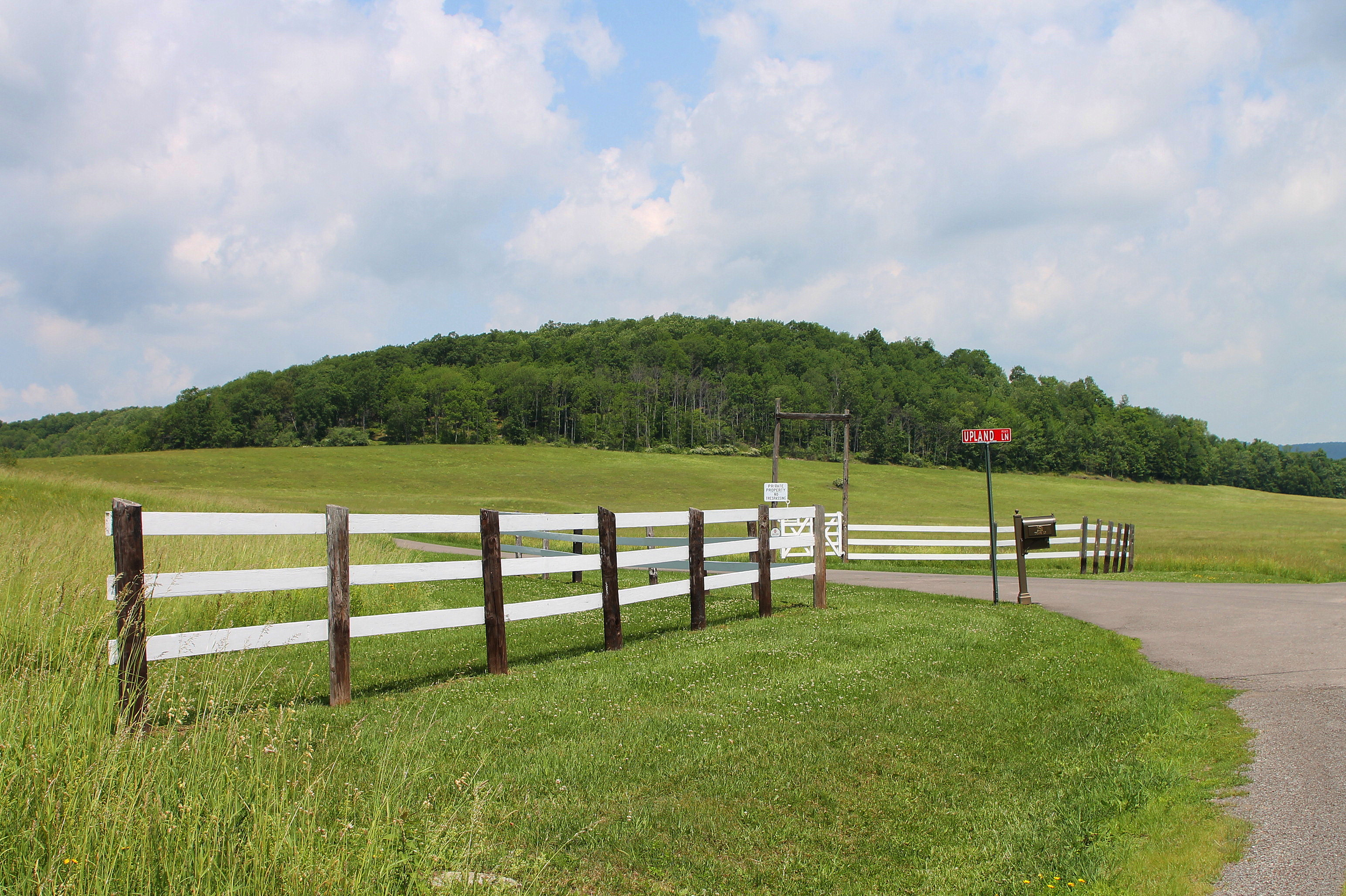
Fields, hills, woods, and a fence
