= David Morey =

American professor

- Education: University of Pennsylvania
- Occupations: Political and business consultant
- Known for: Chairman and CEO of DMG Global

David Morey is an American consultant, strategist, author, speaker, professor, and magician.

== Career ==
Morey serves as the chairman and CEO of DMG Global and vice chairman of Core Strategy Group. He has advised five Nobel Peace Prize winners, nineteen winning global presidential campaigns including Bill Clinton and Barack Obama, and numerous Fortune 500 CEOs. Morey is also the author of The Underdog Advantage, The Leadership Campaign, Creating Business Magic, and Innovating Innovation.

Morey has worked with foreign candidates and governments including Colombian president Virgilio Barco, Philippine president Corazon Aquino, and Russian president Boris Yeltsin. In 1997, he advised the winning presidential campaign of Kim Dae Jung, the first opposition leader to be elected in Korean history, along with advising the Government of Korea during its financial crisis and recovery. His work was featured in the book Alpha Dogs by James Harding. More recently, Morey has advised the successful campaigns of Vicente Fox, Mexico’s first successful opposition presidential candidate in 70 years, as well as South Korea’s Moon Jae In.

Morey is a past chairman of the Council on Foreign Relations’ Task Force on Public Diplomacy and co-chairman of the Fund For Peace along with serving on the Defense Science Board’s Task Force on U.S. Strategic Communications and National Security, and was a special advisor to the US Department of Homeland Security. He also served as a foreign policy advisor to Senator John Glenn.

Morey has consulted companies including Apple, Coke, Microsoft, McDonald’s, LinkedIn, Google, Nike, Visa, American Express, TPG, and CVS Health. He has also served as a professor at Columbia University, the University of Pennsylvania, and the University of International Business and Economics in Beijing.

He was the winner of the Joseph Wharton Award in 2018 for lifetime achievement and leadership and is a commentator on business, politics, and national security for major television networks including BBC, CNN, MSNBC, Fox News, and CNBC. Morey is also a public speaker and magician having performed at President Barack Obama's Inaugural ball. In the spring of 2021, he was featured in River Towns magazine.

== Early life and education ==
Morey was born in Morristown, New Jersey, and grew up Bucks County, Pennsylvania, where he graduated from Central Bucks High School East and is a member of their Athletic Hall of Fame. He is a four-time All-American decathlon competitor, IC4A champion, member of several US national teams, and was ranked in both the US and internationally as a decathlete.

He went on to graduate from the Wharton School of the University of Pennsylvania and The London School of Economics. Morey resides in Washington, D.C., and Bucks County.
