= Central Bucks High School South =

Location
- 1100 Folly Road; Warrington, PA 18976; United States
- 40.262°N 75.163°W

Information
- Type: Public high school
- Established: 2004
- School district: Central Bucks School District
- NCES School ID: 420531000785
- Principal: Jason H. Bucher
- Senior House Principal: Brian J. Scholl
- Junior House Principal: Jennifer M. Opdyke
- Sophomore House Principal: Joseph A. Piselli
- Teaching staff: 109.40 FTEs
- Grades: 9-12
- Enrollment: 1,719 (2024-2025)
  - Grade 10: 553
  - Grade 11: 579
  - Grade 12: 587
- Student to teacher ratio: 15.27
- Language: English
- Colors: Black and Blue
- Athletics: PIAA AAAA - Suburban One League
- Athletics conference: Suburban One Continental
- Mascot: The Titan
- Feeder schools: Tamanend Middle School, Unami Middle School
- Website: https://cbsouth.cbsd.org/

Central Bucks High School South, also known as CB South, is a public high school serving students in ninth through twelfth grades, one of three high schools in the Central Bucks School District. The school is located in Warrington, Pennsylvania in Bucks County.

As of the 2024-25 school year, the school had an enrollment of 1,719 students and 112.58 classroom teachers (on an FTE basis), for a student–teacher ratio of 15.27. There were 232 students (13.50% of enrollment) eligible for free lunch and 27 (1.57% of students) eligible for reduced-cost lunch.

Completed in late 2004, the school opened in January 2005, meaning the first graduating class attended classes in the school only during the spring semester of that year. CB South is the most recent high school in the Central Bucks School District, following Central Bucks High School East and Central Bucks High School West. The high school hosts grades 9–12 and is currently undergoing renovation due to its previous status as a 10-12 high school. Its two feeder schools are Unami Middle School and Tamanend Middle School.

CB South is located on Folly Road. The school cost approximately $69.9 million to build and is the largest school in the Central Bucks School District.

== Academics ==
CB South is ranked among the best high schools in Pennsylvania. CB South students consistently place in the top 10% of the state in test scoring. The majority of students (78%) are Caucasian, with 9% Asian, 2% African American, 7% Hispanic, and 4% multiracial. They spend about $9,500 on every student. Beginning in the 2019-2020 school year, after a successful pilot at Holicong Middle School, all sophomores and juniors received laptops as a part of the district’s 1:1 initiative for use in the classroom.

== Athletics ==
CB South competes in the Pennsylvania Interscholastic Athletic Association, in the Suburban One Conference. The School offers 22 sports, both boys and girls, with strengths in football, field hockey, boys/girls indoor and outdoor track, boys/girls basketball, girls soccer, softball, wrestling, and ice hockey. In Central Bucks South's inaugural year of 2004, it received its first state championship, in men's swimming. In 2012, the Central Bucks South softball team was the first team sport to bring a PIAA AAAA State Championship back to Warrington. The Central Bucks South Ice Hockey team won the class AA State Championship in 2014 and 2016.

== Societal impact ==
In 2015, CB South gained national attention when the students selected two of their classmates with Down syndrome as Homecoming King and Queen.

== Notable alumni ==
- Josh Adams, University of Vanderbilt Offensive Quality Control Coach and a Philanthropist.

== Images ==
CB South panorama
