= Poverty Resolutions =

- Founded: 2010
- Founder: Matt Jones and Andrew Jones
- Type: 501(c)(3)
- Purpose: Poverty education and alleviation
- Location: Doylestown, Pennsylvania, USA
- Region served: Haiti
- Website: www.povertyresolutions.org

Poverty Resolutions is a 501(c)(3) nonprofit organization founded in February 2010 in State College, Pennsylvania, by Matthew Jones and Andrew Jones. The mission is to educate America's youth on poverty in the developing world and inspire them to take action. Work in Haiti is focused on the long-term economic improvement by providing sustainable solutions to poverty.

== Haitian projects ==
Poverty Resolutions's website states that the goal of Haitian projects is to "provide sustainable solutions to poverty, which empower individuals and organizations to meet the needs of their communities."

Projects in Haiti are designed to provide jobs and long term economic benefit. An example of this is a Tilapia Farm. Tilapia farms are big initial investments ($10,000) but provide jobs for farmers, Haitian builders, and fish sellers. In addition it is bringing a healthy food source into the economy.

Poverty Resolutions makes trips to Haiti and brings along a wide range of people, from college athletes to blue-collar professionals.

== US programs ==
Poverty Resolutions is dedicated to educating youth, hoping to inspire the upcoming generation to take part in the global fight against poverty. One strategy has been to tap into the power of social media, one of the biggest traits of the upcoming generations.

Poverty Resolutions have found ways to get their message out. An example of this was an activity to demonstrate the enormity of the 21,000 children who die each day from poverty; 5 guys were shot with 21,000 paint-balls.

Poverty resolutions also have presented assemblies for local schools. One school in particular, Gayman elementary, got behind the Poverty resolutions movement and fundraised $5,200, $3,000 over their original goal.
