= 1982 Arizona Wildcats baseball team =

American college baseball season

1982 Arizona Wildcats baseball
- Conference: Pacific-10 Conference
- Record: 32–21–1 (15–13–1 Pac-10)
- Head coach: Jerry Kindall (10th season)
- Assistant coaches: Jerry Stitt (4th season); Jim Wing (10th season)
- Home stadium: Wildcat Field

1982 Pacific-10 Conference baseball standings
	Conf.						Overall
Team	W		L		T	PCT	W		L		T	PCT
Northern
Oregon State ^{x}‍‍‍	16	–	8	–	0	.667	29	–	15	–	0	.659
Washington State ‍‍‍	16	–	8	–	0	.667	34	–	16	–	0	.680
Eastern Washington ‍‍‍	15	–	9	–	0	.625	24	–	28	–	0	.462
Portland State ‍‍‍	11	–	13	–	0	.458	27	–	23	–	0	.540
Gonzaga ‍‍‍	10	–	14	–	0	.417	30	–	28	–	0	.517
Washington ‍‍‍	10	–	14	–	0	.417	22	–	24	–	0	.478
Portland ‍‍‍	6	–	18	–	0	.250	19	–	24	–	1	.443
Southern
No. 3 Arizona State ^{x}‍‍‍^{y}	23	–	5	–	0	.821	58	–	15	–	0	.795
No. 6 Stanford ‍‍‍^{y}	20	–	10	–	0	.667	49	–	18	–	1	.728
Arizona ‍‍‍	15	–	14	–	0	.517	32	–	22	–	0	.593
UCLA ‍‍‍	11	–	19	–	0	.367	38	–	27	–	0	.585
California ‍‍‍	9	–	18	–	0	.333	29	–	32	–	0	.475
Southern California ‍‍‍	9	–	21	–	0	.300	23	–	36		.390
x – Division champion y – Invited to the NCAA tournament As of June 30, 1982; Rankings from Collegiate Baseball

The 1982 Arizona Wildcats baseball team represented the University of Arizona during the 1982 NCAA Division I baseball season. The Wildcats played their home games at Wildcat Field. The team was coached by Jerry Kindall in his 10th season at Arizona. The Wildcats finished 32–21–1 overall and placed 3rd in the Pacific-10's Southern Division with an 15–13–1 record. Despite posting records above .500 both overall and in conference play the Wildcats missed the postseasons in 2 consecutive seasons for the 1st time since 1972–1973.

== Previous season ==
The Wildcats finished the 1981 season with a record of 30–22 and 14–16 in conference play, finishing 4th in the "Six-Pac" (Pac-10 Southern). Arizona missed the postseason for the 1st time since 1977.

== Personnel ==
=== Roster ===
1982 Arizona Wildcats baseball roster
• Marcel Bachelier • Jim Bagnall • Tommy Barrett • John Beuerlein • Kevin Blankenship • Kerry Burns • Casey Candaele • David Cooper	• Rocky Coyle • Jack Daugherty • Dan Devers • Robin Driezler • Chuck Hovack • Dave Landrith • Tyler Lawton	• Rich Lucero • Dave Page • Pat Roessler • David Rooker • Doug Scherer • Ron Sismondo • Ed Vosberg • Kevin Ward

=== Coaches ===
1982 Arizona Wildcats baseball coaching staff
- Jerry Kindall – Head coach
- Jerry Stitt – Assistant coach
- Jim Wing - Assistant coach

== 1982 Schedule and results ==
1982 Arizona Wildcats baseball game log
Regular season
Date	Opponent	Site/Stadium	Score	Overall Record	Pac-10 Record
Feb 5	UC Santa Barbara	Wildcat Field • Tucson, AZ	W 5–4	1–0–0	
Feb 6	UC Santa Barbara	Wildcat Field • Tucson, AZ	W 13–12	2–0–0	
Feb 6	UC Santa Barbara	Wildcat Field • Tucson, AZ	W 14–2	3–0–0	
Feb 9	San Diego	Wildcat Field • Tucson, AZ	W 11–6	4–0–0	
Feb 9	San Diego	Wildcat Field • Tucson, AZ	W 16–6	5–0–0	
Feb 12	Cal State Fullerton	Wildcat Field • Tucson, AZ	L 4–12	5–1–0	
Feb 12	Cal State Fullerton	Wildcat Field • Tucson, AZ	L 1–5	5–2–0	
Feb 13	Cal State Fullerton	Wildcat Field • Tucson, AZ	W 7–2	6–2–0	
Feb 15	UC Riverside	Wildcat Field • Tucson, AZ	W 10–8	7–2–0	
Feb 16	UC Riverside	Wildcat Field • Tucson, AZ	W 7–4	8–2–0	
Feb 18	at Cal State Fullerton	Titan Field • Fullerton, CA	L 2–3	8–3–0	
Feb 19	at Cal State Fullerton	Titan Field • Fullerton, CA	W 2–1	9–3–0	
Feb 20	at Cal State Fullerton	Titan Field • Fullerton, CA	L 3–17	9–4–0	
Feb 22	UTEP	Wildcat Field • Tucson, AZ	W 7–4	10–4–0	
Feb 23	UTEP	Wildcat Field • Tucson, AZ	W 11–1	11–4–0	
Feb 26	at Arizona State	Packard Stadium • Tempe, AZ	W 8–5	12–4–0	1–0–0
Feb 27	at Arizona State	Packard Stadium • Tempe, AZ	T 4–4	12–4–1	1–0–1
Feb 28	at Arizona State	Packard Stadium • Tempe, AZ	L 5–9	12–5–1	1–1–1
Mar 1	Azusa Pacific	Wildcat Field • Tucson, AZ	W 12–5	13–5–1	
Mar 2	Azusa Pacific	Wildcat Field • Tucson, AZ	W 9–4	14–5–1	
Mar 4	Long Beach State	Wildcat Field • Tucson, AZ	L 15–23	14–6–1	
Mar 5	Long Beach State	Wildcat Field • Tucson, AZ	W 14–13	15–6–1	
Mar 6	Long Beach State	Wildcat Field • Tucson, AZ	W 3–1	16–6–1	
Mar 12	at Stanford	Sunken Diamond • Palo Alto, CA	L 1–2	16–7–1	1–2–1
Mar 13	at Stanford	Sunken Diamond • Palo Alto, CA	L 7–10	16–8–1	1–3–1
Mar 13	at Stanford	Sunken Diamond • Palo Alto, CA	L 5–9	16–9–1	1–4–1
Mar 19	at UC Santa Barbara	Campus Stadium • Santa Barbara, CA	L 4–5	16–10–1	
Mar 20	at UC Santa Barbara	Campus Stadium • Santa Barbara, CA	L 6–8	16–11–1	
Mar 20	at UC Santa Barbara	Campus Stadium • Santa Barbara, CA	W 9–2	17–11–1	
Mar 30	at Grand Canyon	Brazell Field • Phoenix, AZ	L 2–9	17–12–1	
Apr 2	USC	Wildcat Field • Tucson, AZ	W 8–6	18–12–1	2–4–1
Apr 3	USC	Wildcat Field • Tucson, AZ	L 3–12	18–13–1	2–5–1
Apr 4	USC	Wildcat Field • Tucson, AZ	W 11–7	19–13–1	3–5–1
Apr 5	Stanford	Wildcat Field • Tucson, AZ	W 7–4	20–13–1	4–5–1
Apr 6	Stanford	Wildcat Field • Tucson, AZ	L 7–19	20–14–1	4–6–1
Apr 7	Stanford	Wildcat Field • Tucson, AZ	W 4–2	21–14–1	5–6–1
Apr 16	at USC	Dedeaux Field • Los Angeles, CA	W 11–5	22–14–1	6–6–1
Apr 17	at USC	Dedeaux Field • Los Angeles, CA	L 1–2	22–15–1	6–7–1
Apr 18	at USC	Dedeaux Field • Los Angeles, CA	W 20–2	23–15–1	7–7–1
Apr 20	Grand Canyon	Wildcat Field • Tucson, AZ	W 11–1	24–15–1	
Apr 23	at UCLA	Jackie Robinson Stadium • Los Angeles, CA	W 2–1	25–15–1	8–7–1
Apr 24	at UCLA	Jackie Robinson Stadium • Los Angeles, CA	W 6–2	26–15–1	9–7–1
Apr 25	at UCLA	Jackie Robinson Stadium • Los Angeles, CA	L 0–3	26–16–1	9–8–1
Apr 29	California	Wildcat Field • Tucson, AZ	L 2–3	26–17–1	9–9–1
Apr 29	California	Wildcat Field • Tucson, AZ	W 7–2	27–17–1	10–9–1
Apr 30	California	Wildcat Field • Tucson, AZ	W 5–4	28–17–1	11–9–1
May 1	California	Wildcat Field • Tucson, AZ	W 5–2	29–17–1	12–9–1
May 2	California	Wildcat Field • Tucson, AZ	W 10–6	30–17–1	13–9–1
May 7	UCLA	Wildcat Field • Tucson, AZ	L 7–10	30–18–1	13–10–1
May 8	UCLA	Wildcat Field • Tucson, AZ	W 7–5	31–18–1	14–10–1
May 9	UCLA	Wildcat Field • Tucson, AZ	L 6–12	31–19–1	14–11–1
May 13	Arizona State	Wildcat Field • Tucson, AZ	L 4–6	31–20–1	14–12–1
May 14	Arizona State	Wildcat Field • Tucson, AZ	L 4–7	31–21–1	14–13–1
May 15	Arizona State	Wildcat Field • Tucson, AZ	W 5–4	32–21–1	15–13–1

== 1982 MLB draft ==
Player	Position	Round	Overall	MLB team
Ed Vosberg	LHP	11	264	Toronto Blue Jays
Ron Sismondo	LHP	13	320	Seattle Mariners
Tommy Barrett	INF	26	667	New York Yankees
Kevin Ward	OF	29	735	St. Louis Cardinals
Dave Rooker	OF	31	763	Kansas City Royals
