= Little Neshaminy Creek =

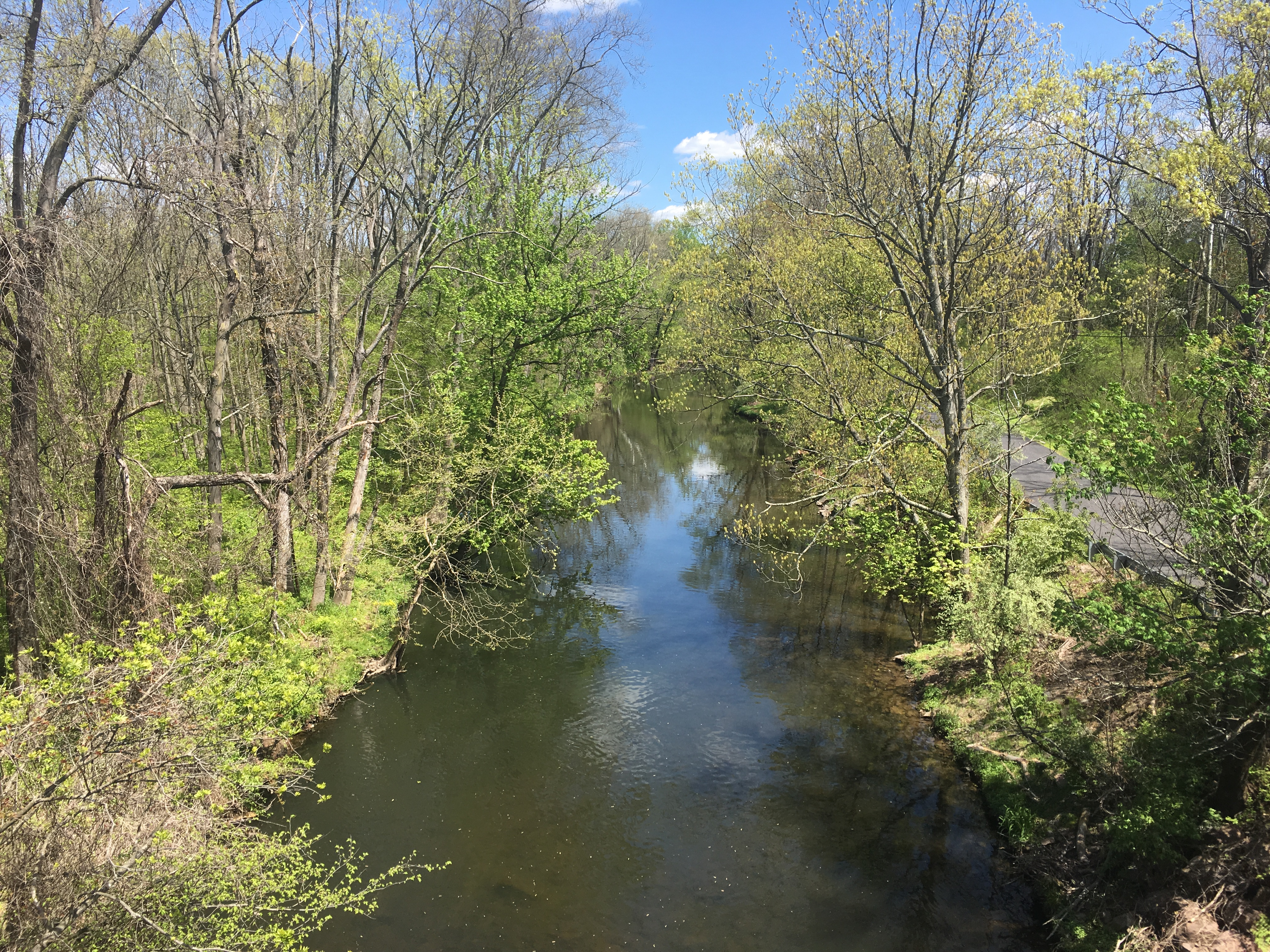
- Little Neshaminy Creek in Warwick Township

- Little Neshaminy Creek

Location
- Country: United States
- State: Pennsylvania
- County: Montgomery, Bucks
- Township: Horsham; Montgomery; Warrington; Warminster; Warwick; Northampton

Physical characteristics
- Source
  - coordinates: 40°13′48″N 75°14′49″W
  - elevation: 450 feet (140 m)
- Mouth
  - coordinates: 40°15′21″N 75°1′59″W
  - elevation: 125 feet (38 m)
- Length: 15.5 miles (24.9 km)
- Basin size: 43 square miles (110 km^{2})

Basin features
- Progression: Little Neshaminy Creek → Neshaminy Creek → Delaware River → Delaware Bay
- River system: Delaware River
- Landmarks: Windlestrae Park; Nikesite Park; Lower Nike Park; Bradford Reservoir; Kemper Park; Barness Park
- Tributaries
  - right: Park Creek
- Waterbodies: Bradford Reservoir
- Slope: 20.97 feet per mile (3.972 m/km)

Little Neshaminy Creek is a tributary of the Neshaminy Creek, part of the Delaware River Watershed rising near the intersection of U.S. Route 202 and Pennsylvania Route 309 near Montgomeryville, Pennsylvania and meets its confluence with Neshaminy Creek at the Neshaminy's 24.10 River mile.

== History ==
There were a number of mills erected on the Little Neshaminy including the Old Hartsville Mill and the Upper and Lower Mearns' Mills. In 1942 there were ten bridges across the creek.

== Statistics ==
The watershed of the Little Neshaminy Creek is 43 square miles (110 km^{2}), passing through suburban residential and commercial areas, as well as four public parks in Montgomery County, and Bucks County. The Geographic Name Information System I.D. is 1179624, U.S. Department of the Interior Geological Survey I.D. is 02638.

== Course ==
Rising in Montgomery Township the Little Neshaminy Creek runs generally east for about 3.5 miles (5.6 km) passing through Windlestrae Park on the way where it meets unnamed tributary from the left, and another unnamed tributary from the right to the east of the park, then it runs southeast for 1.5 miles (2.4 km) touching Nike Park, then the Bradford Reservoir Recreation Area and dam where it meets another tributary from the right in the reservoir and meets Park Creek from the right below the reservoir at the Little Neshaminy's 6.32 river mile. Finally, it runs generally east for about 6.25 miles (10.06 km) picking up one tributary from the left and five on the right where it meets its confluence at the Neshaminy Creek's 24.10 River mile.

== Geology ==
- Appalachian Highlands Division
  - Piedmont Province
    - Gettysburg Newark Lowland Section
      - Lockatong Formation

The Little Neshaminy lies entirely within the Lockatong geologic formation, consisting of argillite, shale, limestone, and calcareous shale.

== Named tributaries ==
- Park Creek

== Municipalities ==
- Bucks County
  - Northampton Township
  - Warwick Township
  - Warminster Township
  - Warrington Township
- Montgomery County
  - Horsham Township
  - Montgomery Township

== Crossings and bridges ==
Crossing	NBI Number	Length	Lanes	Spans	Material/Design	Built	Reconstructed	Latitude	Longitude
Pennsylvania Route 309 (Bethlehem Pike)	-	-	-	-	-	-	-	-	-
Pennsylvania Route 463 (Horsham Road)	-	-	-	-	-	-	-	-	-
Stump Road	27883	9 metres (30 ft)	2	2	Stringer/multi-beam or girder, concrete continuous	1916	-	-	-
Springhouse Court	-	_	-	-	-	-	-	-	-
Kenas Road (SR 2014)	27606	11 metres (36 ft)	2	1	slab design concrete	1959	-	-	-
Pennsylvania Route 152 (Limekiln Pike)	27322	13 metres (43 ft)	2	2	Arch Deck, stone masonry	-	2012	-	
County Line Road	7268	16 metres (52 ft)	3	1	Box Beam or Girder - multiple, prestressed concrete	1985	-	40°14'10"N	75°10'44"W
Kansas Road	7531	11 metres (36 ft)	2	1	Box Beam or Girder - multiple, prestressed concrete	1979	-	40°13'27"N	75°8'42"W
Pennsylvania Route 611 (Easton Road)	7059	32 metres (105 ft)	5	2	Box Beam or Girder - multiple, prestressed concrete	1963	-	40°13'31"N	75°8'25"W
Paul Valley Road	53690	24.4 metres (80 ft)	-	-	Concrete Box Beam or girders - single or spread, concrete cast-in-place decking	2008	-	40°13'29"N	75°8'4"W
Pennsylvania Route 132 (West Street Road)	6904	52 metres (171 ft)	2	3	Stringer multi-beam or girder, prestressed concrete continuous	1960	1995	-	-
Valley Road	7930	40 metres (130 ft)	2	3	Box Beam or Girder, prestressed concrete	1965	-	40°13'44"N	75°7'12"W
West Bristol Road	40736	91 metres (299 ft)	2	3	Stringer/Multi-beam or Girder, steel continuous	1999	-	40°13'57"N	75°6'7"W
Old York Road	7649	25 metres (82 ft)	2	1	Stringer/Multi-beam or Girder, steel	1930	2000	40°14'4"N	75°5'28"W
Pennsylvania Route 263 (York Road)	-	-	-	-	-	-	-	-	
Almshouse Road	7333	43 metres (141 ft)	2	2	Box Beam or Girder, prestressed concrete	1963	2011	40°14'21"N	75°3'40"W
Sacketts Ford Road	7356	29 metres (95 ft)	2	1	Stringer/Multi-beam or Girder, steel	1973	-	40°15'20"N	75°2'2"W

== See also ==
- List of rivers of Pennsylvania
- List of rivers of the United States
- List of Delaware River tributaries

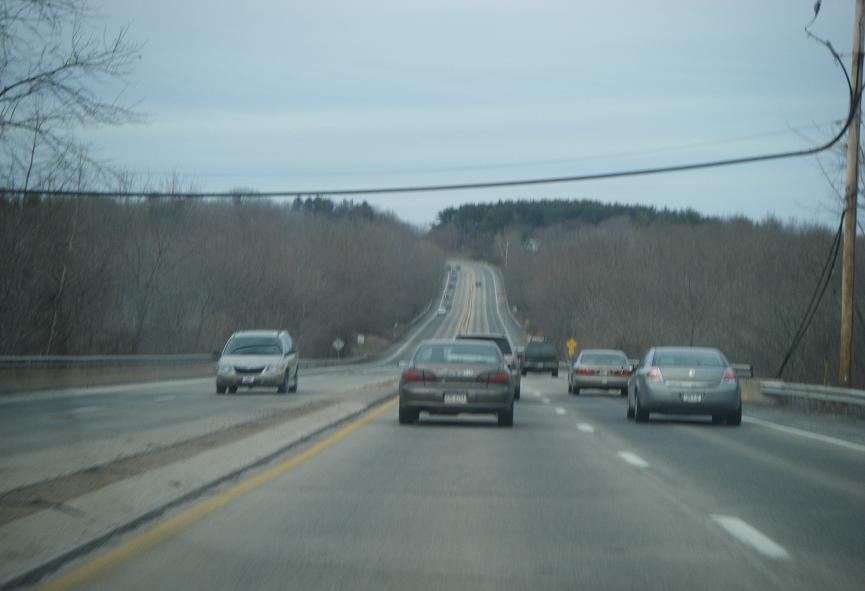
Northbound Pennsylvania Route 263 (York Road) over the Little Neshaminy Creek in Warwick Township in Bucks County, Pennsylvania, 26 January 2008.

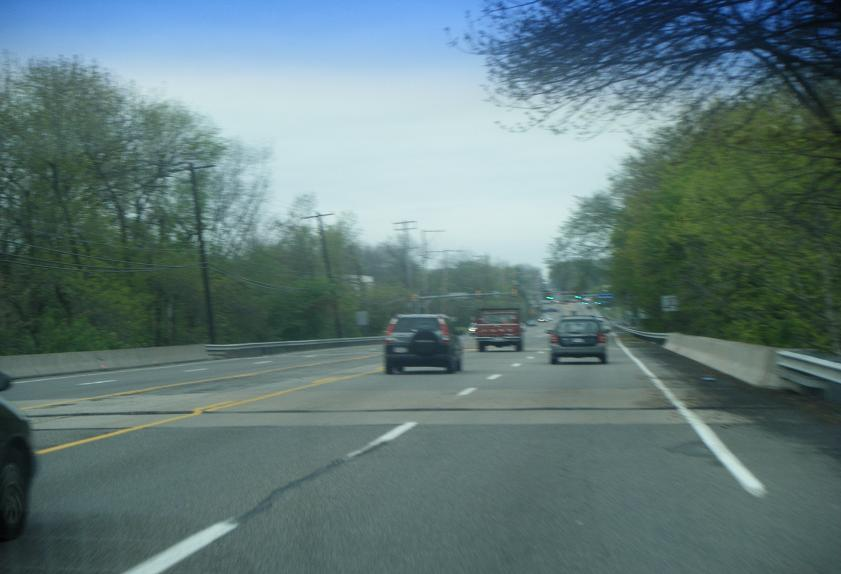
Westbound Pennsylvania Route 132 (Street Road) over the Little Neshaminy Creek in Warrington, Pennsylvania, 27 April 2008.

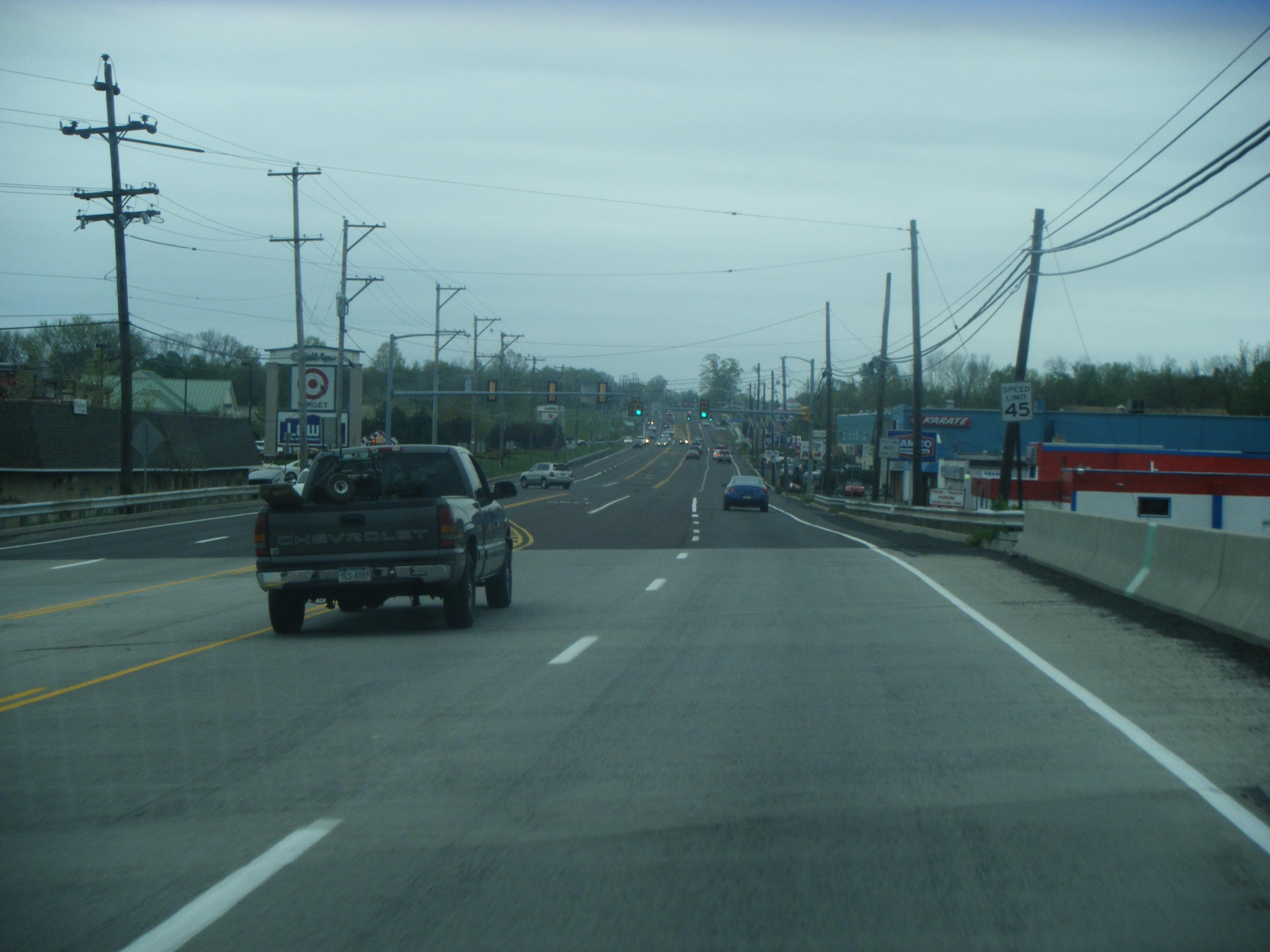
Southbound Pennsylvania Route 611 (Easton Road) over the Little Neshaminy Creek in Warrington, Pennsylvania, 27 April 2008.

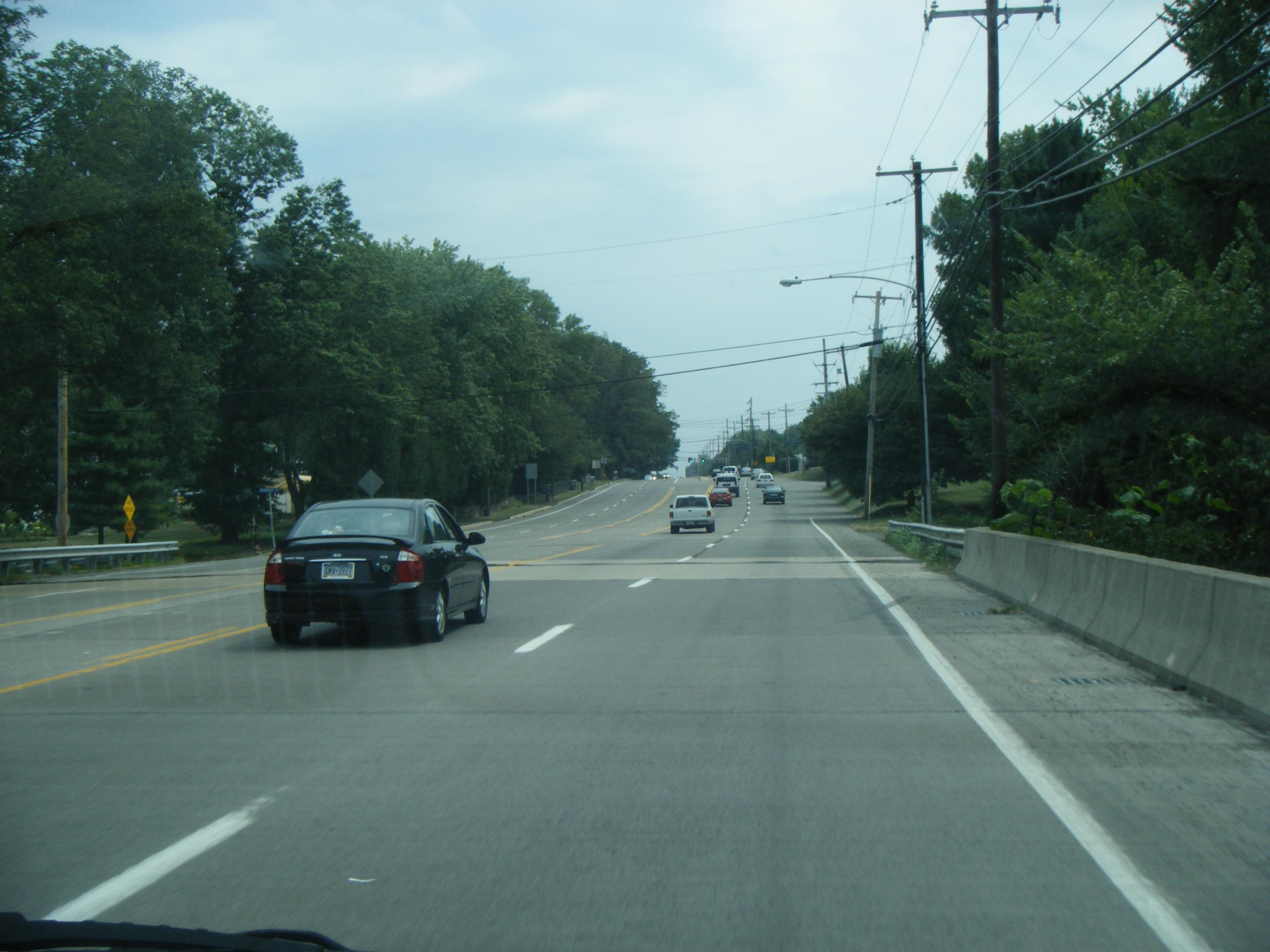
Eastbound Pennsylvania Route 132 (Street Road) over the Little Neshaminy Creek in Warrington, Pennsylvania, 25 August 2008.

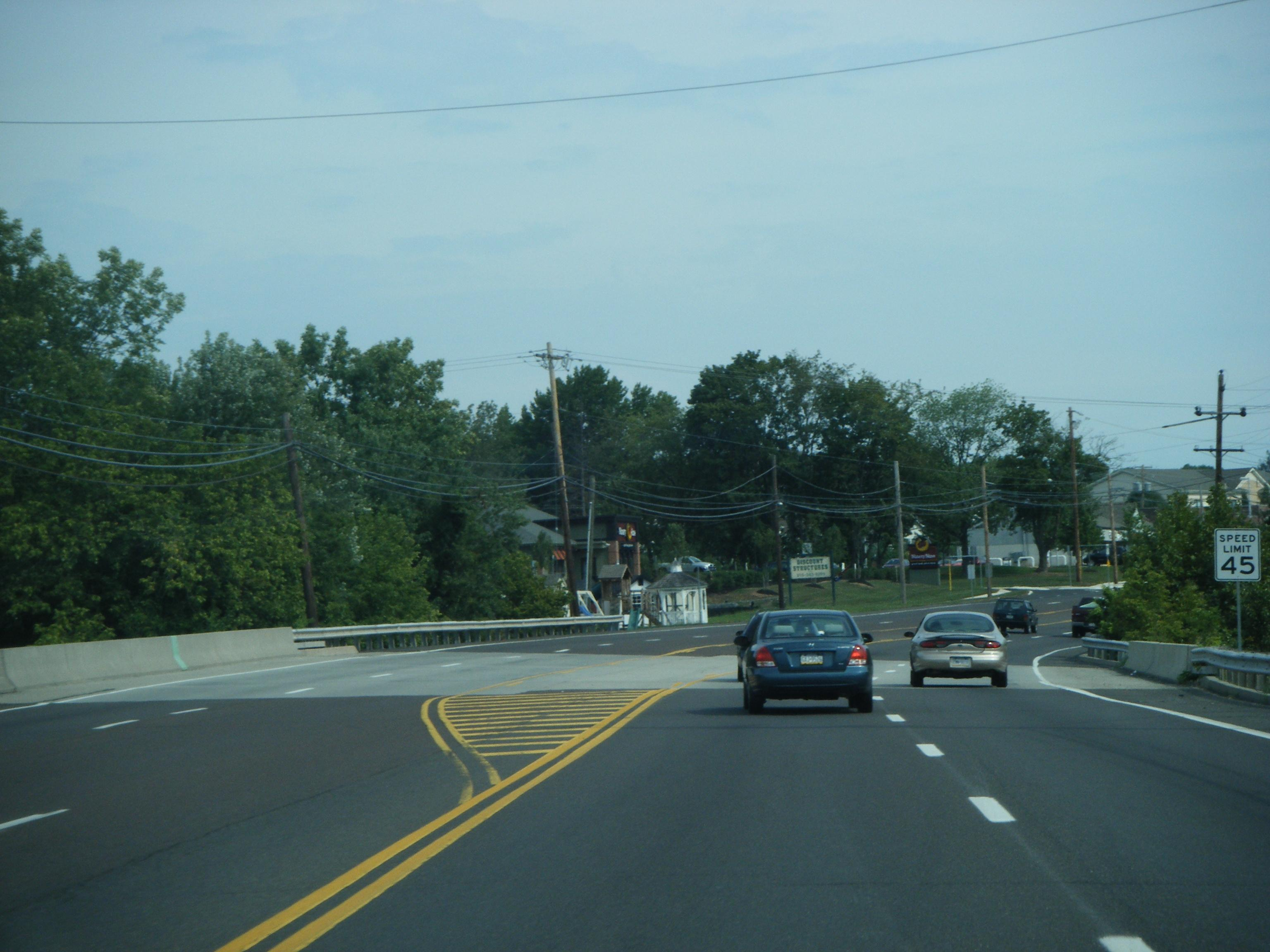
Northbound Pennsylvania Route 611 (Easton Road) over the Little Neshaminy Creek in Warrington, Pennsylvania, 10 August 2008.

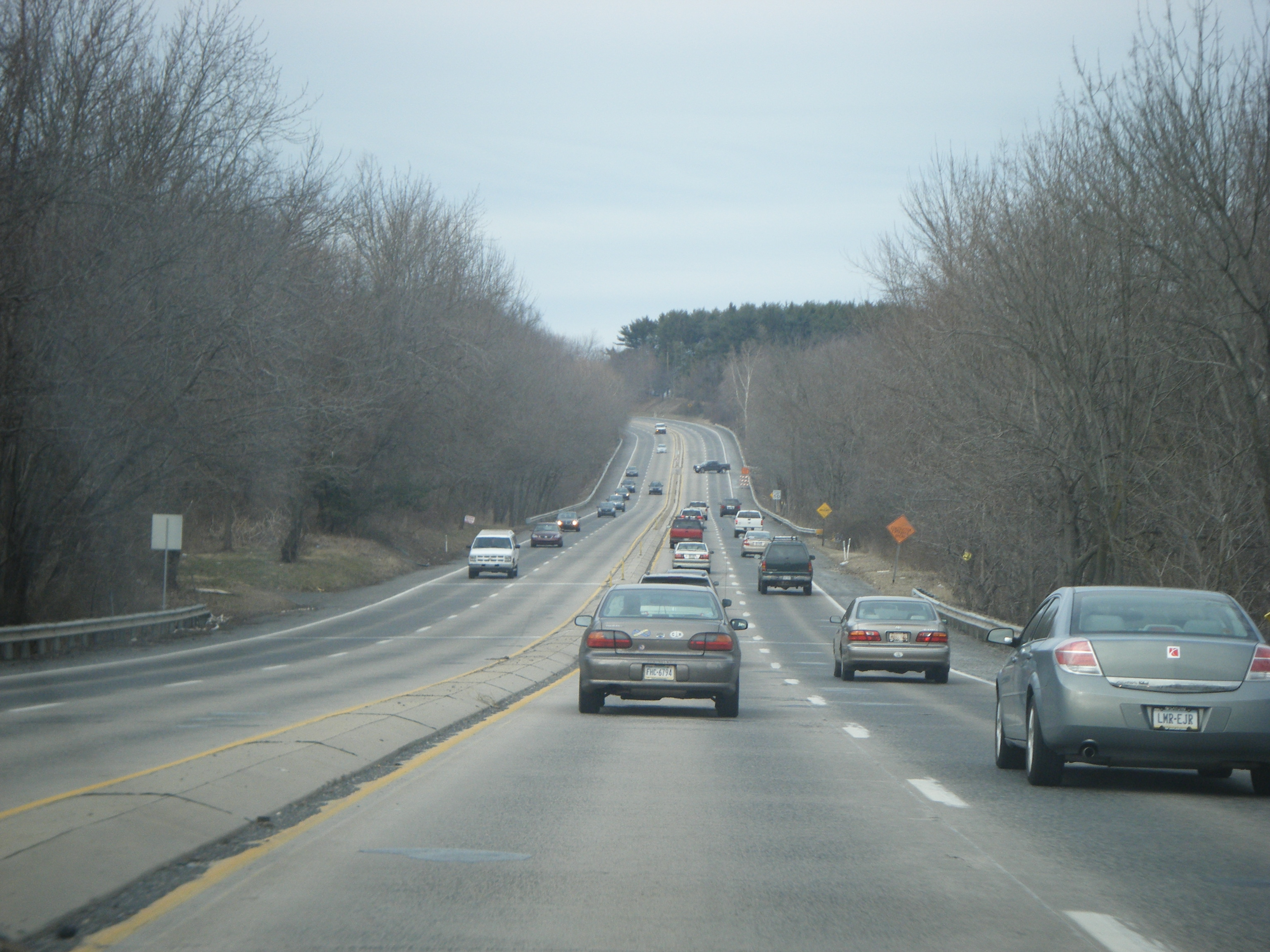
Northbound Pennsylvania Route 263 (York Road) past the Little Neshaminy Creek bridge in Warwick Township in Bucks County, Pennsylvania, 26 January 2008.

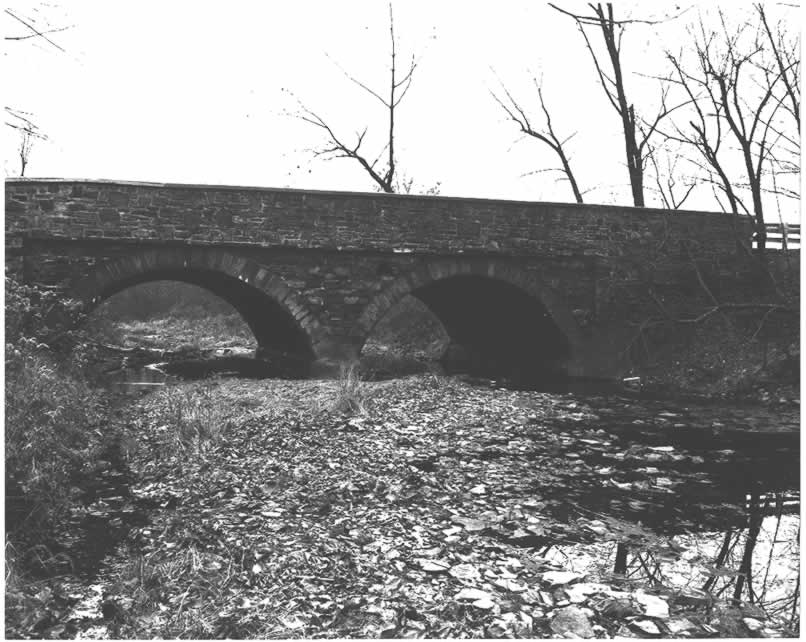
The Horsham–Montgomery Bridge is a stone bridge that carries Pennsylvania Route 152 (Limekiln Pike) over the Little Neshaminy Creek in Montgomery County, Pennsylvania, United States.
