= Central Bucks High School East =

Location
- 2804 Holicong Road; Buckingham, Pennsylvania; United States; 40.339°N 75.056°W

Information
- Type: Public high school
- Established: 1969
- Principal: Chad Watters
- Teaching staff: 94.30 FTEs
- Grades: 9-12
- Enrollment: 1,374 (2024-2025)
- Student to teacher ratio: 14.57
- Colors: Red, white, and blue
- Mascot: The Patriot
- Nickname: CB East
- Rival: Central Bucks High School West
- Website: http://cbeast.cbsd.org/

Central Bucks High School East is a public high school serving students in tenth through twelfth grades, one of three high schools in the Central Bucks School District. The school is located in Buckingham, Pennsylvania in Bucks County, adjacent to Holicong Middle School. Its sister schools are Central Bucks High School West and Central Bucks High School South and its feeder schools are Holicong Middle School and Tohickon Middle School. Central Bucks High School East is commonly referred to as CB East or "East."

As of the 2022–23 school year, the school had an enrollment of 1,365 students and 90.31 classroom teachers (on an FTE basis), for a student–teacher ratio of 15:1. There were 89 students (6.5% of enrollment) eligible for free lunch and 6 (0.4% of students) eligible for reduced-cost lunch.

== Overview ==
CB East has two feeder middle schools: Holicong Middle School, and a portion of Tohickon Middle School. Prior to the building of Central Bucks High School South, portions of Tamanend Middle School was also a feeder school. CB East has a student population of 1,528, making it the second largest high school in the Central Bucks School District. The school's students follow a block scheduling system in which students take 83-minute classes for one semester, or half of each school year.

The curriculum includes eighteen Advanced Placement courses and honors courses in most disciplines. U.S. News magazine designated Central Bucks High School East as one of the best high schools in the nation. The school has consistently held a 99% graduation rate, with 90% of graduates choosing to further their education. Central Bucks East is also a National Blue Ribbon School of Excellence.

CB East has undergone several additions and renovations since it was opened in 1969. Just a few years after opening, the school faced overcrowding and a two-story addition was constructed that featured "open space" concept classrooms. In 1997 a new wing of classrooms, a new auxiliary gym, and a new, larger library were added. In 2010 the school, now over 40 years old, began a multimillion-dollar addition and renovation project that would encompass the entire school and take several years to complete. The project included the addition of a new science and technology wing with 14 science labs, several computer labs, and a large filming studio. The main lobby was expanded into a two-story atrium, and almost every space in the building received new flooring, modern, efficient lighting with occupancy sensors, and new Smart Board projection systems. The project was completed in 2013. In 2015, the school's Athletic Facility was reconstructed, consisting of a new football Stadium and bleachers for the East Patriots Team, as well as a new track field and tennis courts. Beginning in the 2019–2020 school year, after a successful pilot at Holicong Middle School, all sophomores and juniors received laptops as a part of the district’s 1:1 initiative for use in the classroom.

== Academic record ==
Test	CB East	PA	USA
SAT 2007	1610	1474	1511
SAT 2008	1652	1478	1511
SAT 2009	1673	1477	1509
SAT 2010	1541	1473	1509
SAT 2011	1687	1473	1500
SAT 2012	1659	1472	1498
SAT 2013	1700	1480	1498

== Athletics ==
Central Bucks East offers the following sports teams:

Girls: Basketball, Cheerleading, Cross Country, Field Hockey, Lacrosse, Soccer, Softball, Swimming/Diving, Tennis, Track (winter and spring), Ultimate Frisbee, Volleyball.

Boys: Football, Baseball, Basketball, Cross Country, Golf, Lacrosse, Soccer, Swimming/Diving, Track (winter and spring), Tennis, Ultimate Frisbee, Volleyball, Wrestling.

== Notable alumni ==
- Nick Bitsko, 2020 MLB first-round draft pick, Tampa Bay Rays
- Sean Conley, former Physician to the President
- Molly Ephraim, actor, cast member Last Man Standing and A League of Their Own
- Justin Guarini, first runner-up in American Idol Season 1
- Samantha Hoopes, model
- Meghan Schroeder, politician
- Barrett Christy, professional snowboarder, olympian, and X games gold medal winner
- Bryan Scott, former professional football player, Atlanta Falcons, Buffalo Bills, New Orleans Saints, and Tennessee Titans
- Scott Stankavage, former professional football player, Denver Broncos and Miami Dolphins
- Stephen Susco, screenwriter, The Grudge and The Grudge 2
- Brianna Taylor, cast member, The Real World: Hollywood
- Bradley Vierling, former professional football player, Jacksonville Jaguars and Pittsburgh Steelers
- Chuck Wendig, author and comic book writer
- Lauren Crandall, two time NCAA champion, 2008/2012/2016 Olympic field hockey participant, captain of the 2012 and 2016 Women’s Olympic field hockey team
- Josh Izewski, distance runner

== Notable teachers ==
- Jeff Harding (Phys. Ed) former NHL hockey player.
