= Park Creek (Little Neshaminy Creek tributary) =

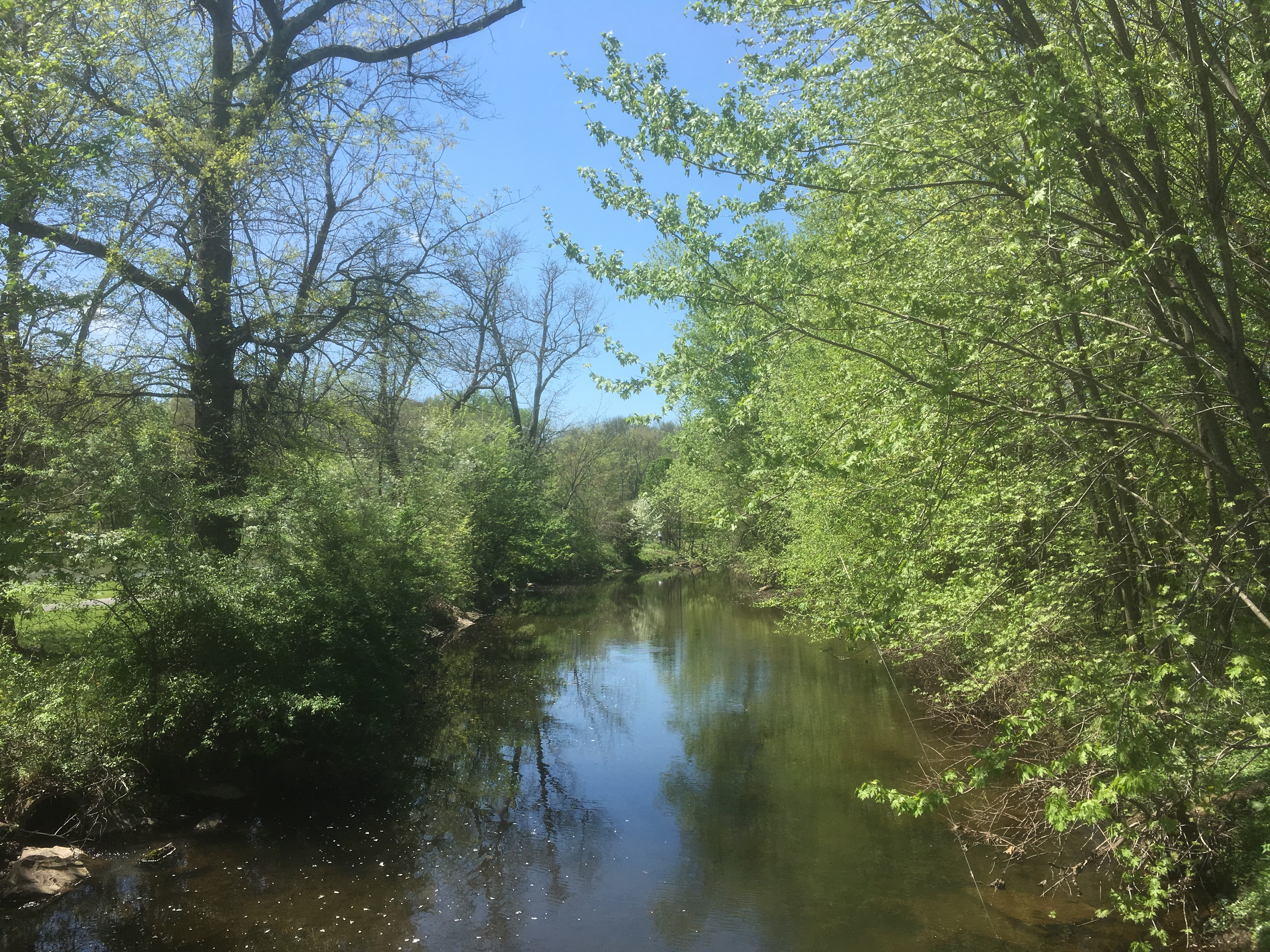
- Park Creek in Kohler Park in Horsham Township, Pennsylvania

- Park Creek

Location
- Country: United States
- State: Pennsylvania
- County: Bucks
- Township: Doylestown; New Britain

Physical characteristics
- Source
  - coordinates: 40°13′15″N 75°13′57″W
  - elevation: 400 feet (120 m)
- Mouth
  - coordinates: 40°13′24″N 75°8′41″W
  - elevation: 220 feet (67 m)
- Length: 6.36 miles (10.24 km)
- Basin size: 11.8 square miles (31 km^{2})

Basin features
- Progression: Park Creek → Little Neshaminy Creek → Neshaminy Creek → Delaware River → Delaware Bay
- River system: Delaware River
- Landmarks: Springhouse Quarry; Cedar Hill Rd Park; Kohler Park; Whitemarsh Memorial Park; Deep Meadow Park; Carpenter Park; Graeme Park; Strawbridge Park
- Bridges: See table
- Slope (Main Branch): 28.3 feet per mile (5.36 m/km)

Park Creek is a tributary of the Little Neshaminy Creek, part of the Delaware River Watershed meeting its confluence at the Little Neshaminy's 9.00 river mile.

== History ==
Park Creek is named for Graeme Park near Horsham, Pennsylvania.

== Statistics ==
Park Creek's watershed covers 11.80 square miles (30.6 km^{2}), passing through suburban areas in Warrington Township, Horsham Township, Montgomery Township, and Lower Gwynedd Township. The Geographic Name Information System I.D. is 1183295, U.S. Department of the Interior Geological Survey I.D. is 02661.

== Course ==
The northern branch of Park Creek rises near Hartman Road (SR 2014) in Montgomery Township, running southeast for about 0.83 miles (1.34 km) then turns east for 0.63 miles (1.01 km), then back to southeast for 1.35 miles (2.17 km) to its confluence with the west branch. The west branch rises near Tennis Avenue in Lower Gwynedd Township, flowing northeast for about 1.75 miles (2.82 km) to the confluence. Together they form the main course of Park Creek, which runs northeast for 2.67 miles (4.30 km) to its confluence at the Little Neshaminy Creek 9.00 river mile. The main creek bed passes through Kohler Park, Deep Meadow Park, and flows along the northwest border of Graeme Park.

== Geology ==
- Appalachian Highlands Division
  - Piedmont Province
    - Gettysburg Newark Lowland Section
      - Lockatong Formation

The Little Neshaminy lies entirely within the Lockatong geologic formation, consisting of argillite, shale, limestone, and calcareous shale.

== Municipalities ==
- Bucks County
  - Warrington Township
- Montgomery County, Pennsylvania
  - Horsham Township
  - Montgomery Township
  - Lower Gwynedd Township

== Crossings and Bridges ==
Crossing	NBI Number	Length	Lanes	Spans	Material/Design	Built	Reconstructed	Latitude	Longitude
Main Branch
Pennsylvania Route 463 (Horsham Road)	-	-	-	-	-	-	-	-	
Davis Grove Road	27798	-	-	-	-	-	-	-	
Keith Valley Road	28000	-	-	-	-	-	-	-	
County Line Road	7270	17 metres (56 ft)	2	1	Box beam or girders - multiple design, prestressed concrete	1985	-	40°13'10"N	75°9'6"W
West Branch Park Creek
Pennsylvania Route 63 (Welsh Road)	-	-	-	-	-	-	-	-	
Talamore Drive	-	-	-	-	-	-	-	-	
Pennsylvania Route 152 (Limekiln Pike)	27319	10 metres (33 ft)	2	1	Tee Beam design, concrete construction	1928	-	-	
North Branch Park Creek
Hartman Road (SR 2014)	-	-	-	-	-	-	-	-	
Regency Drive	-	-	-	-	-	-	-	-	
Lower State Road	-	-	-	-	-	-	-	-	
Cedar Hill Road	27949	20 metres (66 ft)	2	1	Box beam or girder - single or spread, prestressed concrete	2003	-	-	
Pennsylvania Route 152 (Limekiln Pike)	-	-	-	-	-	-	-	-	

== See also ==
- List of rivers of Pennsylvania
- List of rivers of the United States
- List of Delaware River tributaries
