= Neshaminy, Pennsylvania =

Unincorporated community in Pennsylvania, US

- Unincorporated community
- Location within Pennsylvania Location within the United States
- Coordinates: 40°13′46″N 75°08′20″W
- Country: United States
- State: Pennsylvania
- County: Bucks
- Township: Warrington
- Elevation: 253 ft (77 m)
- Time zone: UTC-5 (Eastern (EST))
  - Summer (DST): UTC-4 (EDT)
- ZIP Code: 18976
- Area codes: 215, 267 and 445
- GNIS feature ID: 1182257

Neshaminy is an unincorporated community in Warrington Township in Bucks County, Pennsylvania, United States. Neshaminy is located at the intersection of Pennsylvania Route 611 and Pennsylvania Route 132.
