= Knapp Farm =

Historic house in Pennsylvania, United States

- U.S. National Register of Historic Places
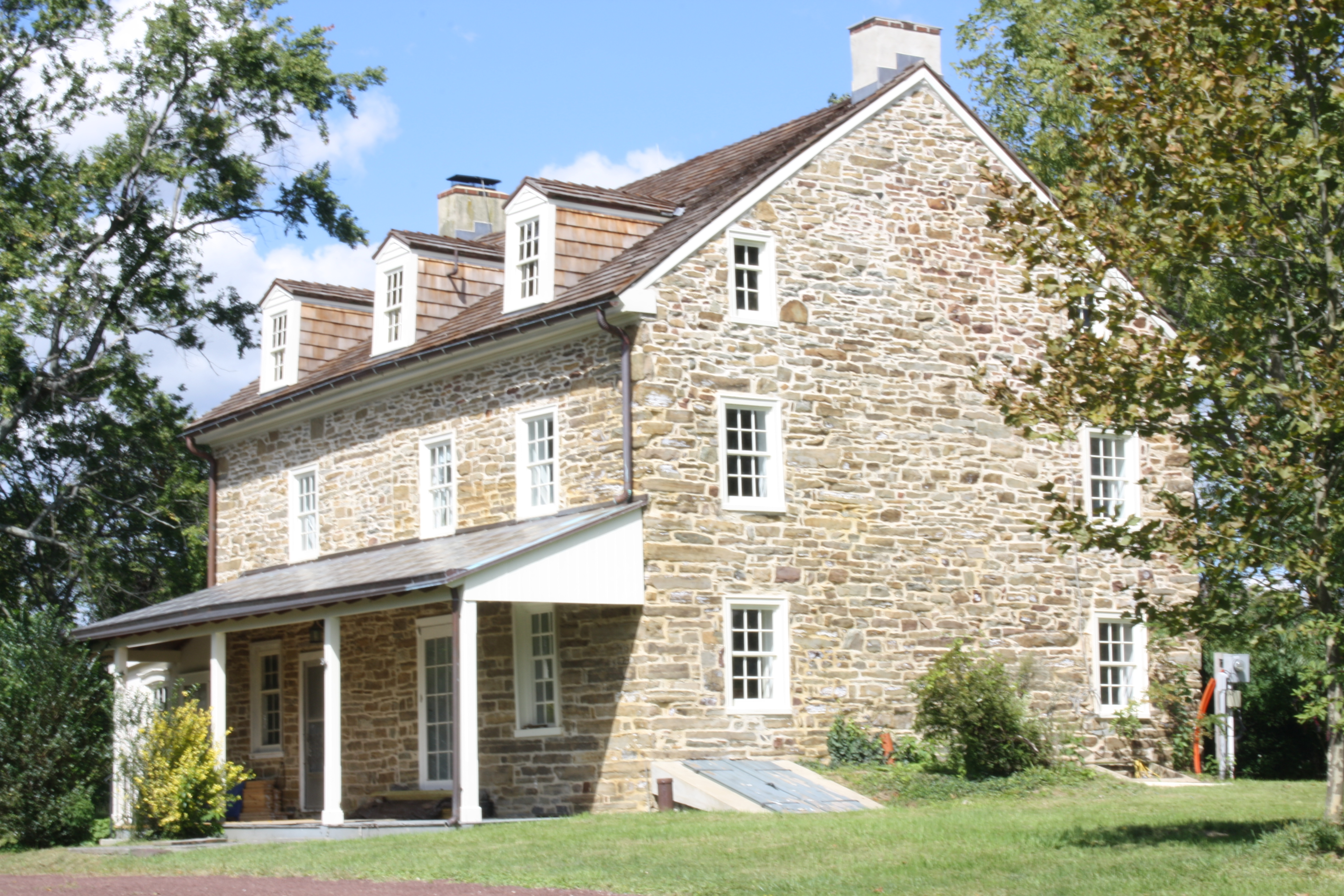
- Knapp Farmhouse, September 2012

- Location within Pennsylvania Location within the United States
- Location: South of Montgomeryville off Pennsylvania Route 309, Montgomery Township, Pennsylvania
- Coordinates: 40°13′48″N 75°14′49″W
- Area: 5 acres (2.0 ha)
- Built: 1760
- NRHP reference No.: 76001656
- Added to NRHP: October 22, 1976

The Knapp Farm, is a historic farmhouse located at the corner of Dekalb Pike and Knapp Road in Montgomery Township, Montgomery County, Pennsylvania. It is also the only township property on the National Register of Historic Places. The farm, which occupies property originally settled just after 1700 by English immigrants, now sits adjacent to the Montgomery Mall. The earliest section of the farmhouse was erected around 1760. It is a 2^{1/2}-story, four-bay, stuccoed stone Germanic house. A brick kitchen wing was added in the mid-19th century.

The property was continuously occupied and farmed until the late 1990s. In 2005, the farmhouse became the property of the Montgomery Township Historical Society (MTHS). The house along with seven acres of open space was donated to the society as part of a development agreement that allowed residential development on the remaining acreage. MTHS is working to restore the property and plans to use it as the society's headquarters as well as an education center to interpret the rural history of the North Penn area.

It was listed on the National Register of Historic Places in 1976.

== See also ==
- National Register of Historic Places listings in Montgomery County, Pennsylvania
