= Samantha Hoopes =

American model

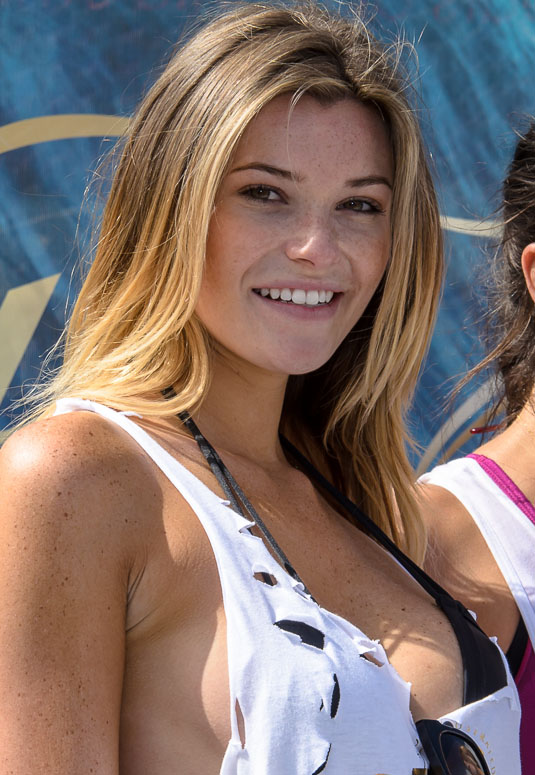
- Hoopes in 2014
- Born: February 10, 1991 (age 35); Doylestown, Pennsylvania, U.S.
- Children: 2
- Modeling information
- Height: 5 ft 8 in (1.73 m)
- Hair color: Blonde; Brown (natural)
- Eye color: Hazel
- Agency: MGM Models (Hamburg)

Samantha Hoopes (born February 10, 1991) is an American model known for her appearances in the Sports Illustrated Swimsuit Issue from 2014 to 2020.

== Early life and education ==
Samatha Hoopes was born on February 10, 1991, in Doylestown, Pennsylvania. She is the daughter of Robert and Theresa Hoopes. A graduate of Central Bucks High School East, she is the youngest of five sisters. She went to Barbizon Chique in Philadelphia for modeling training.

She first attended a branch campus then Penn State University, where she majored in business after changing her major from kinesiology. Hoopes wanted to be a gym teacher and coach a team on the side. Hoopes played field hockey in middle school but not in high school. Since she was modeling, she was told not to play field hockey because she would always get bruises. In 2013, Hoopes moved to Hollywood to start her modeling career.

== Career ==
She appeared nude in the 2014 Sports Illustrated's 50th Anniversary Swimsuit issue body paint section. Hoopes has modeled for Guess and Levi's Jeans.

She posed for the June 2014 of Maxim Magazine. She was ranked 18 out of Maxim's 100 Hottest in 2014.

== Personal life ==
As of July 2018, Hoopes became engaged to Italian entrepreneur Salvatore Palella.

She has two children.
