= Montgomery Mall (Pennsylvania) =

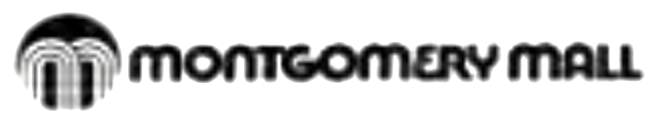

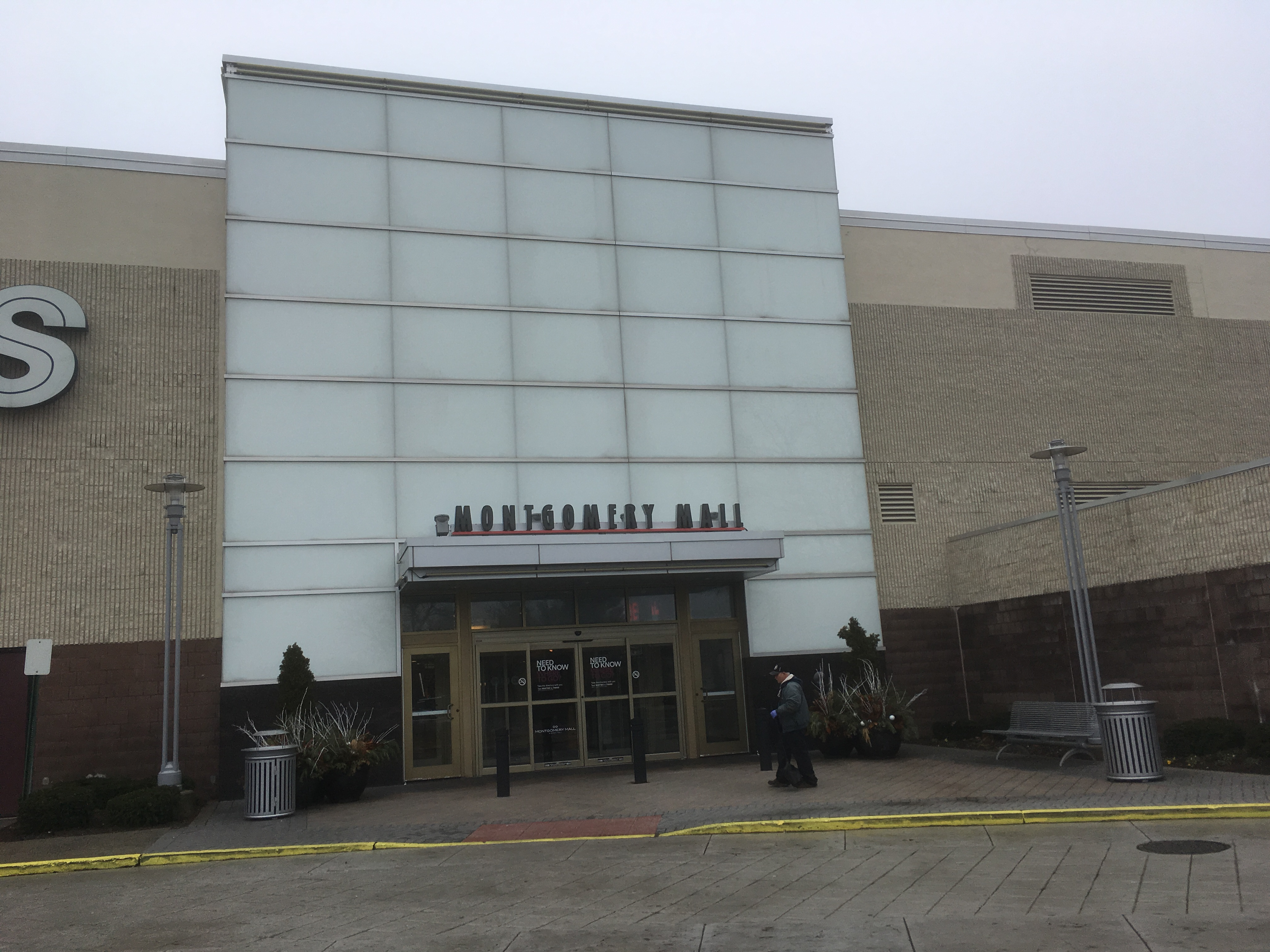
- First floor entrance near former Sears, 2017
- Location: Montgomery Township, Pennsylvania, U.S.
- Coordinates: 40.2351°N 75.2448°W
- Address: 230 Montgomery Mall; North Wales, PA 19454
- Opened: February 26, 1977
- Developer: The Kravco Company
- Owner: Summit Properties USA
- Num. of stores: 40+
- Num. of anchor tenants: 5 (4 open, 1 vacant)
- Floor area: 1,102,755 square feet (102,449 m^{2})
- Floors: 2 (1 in Going, Going, Gone!, & Wegmans)
- Parking: Parking lot
- Public transit: SEPTA bus: 94, 96, 132
- Website: www.shopmontgomerymall.com

Montgomery Mall is a two-story shopping mall located in the community of Montgomeryville in Montgomery Township, Pennsylvania near the borough of North Wales. The mall, owned by Summit Properties USA, is located along Pennsylvania Route 309 (Bethlehem Pike) at the intersection with U.S. Route 202 Business (Dekalb Pike), amidst other commercial development. In its heyday, it contained over 90 stores and eateries; now containing around 10-15 stores with the remaining stores left vacant. It is anchored by JCPenney, Macy's, Going, Going, Gone!, and Wegmans.

== History ==
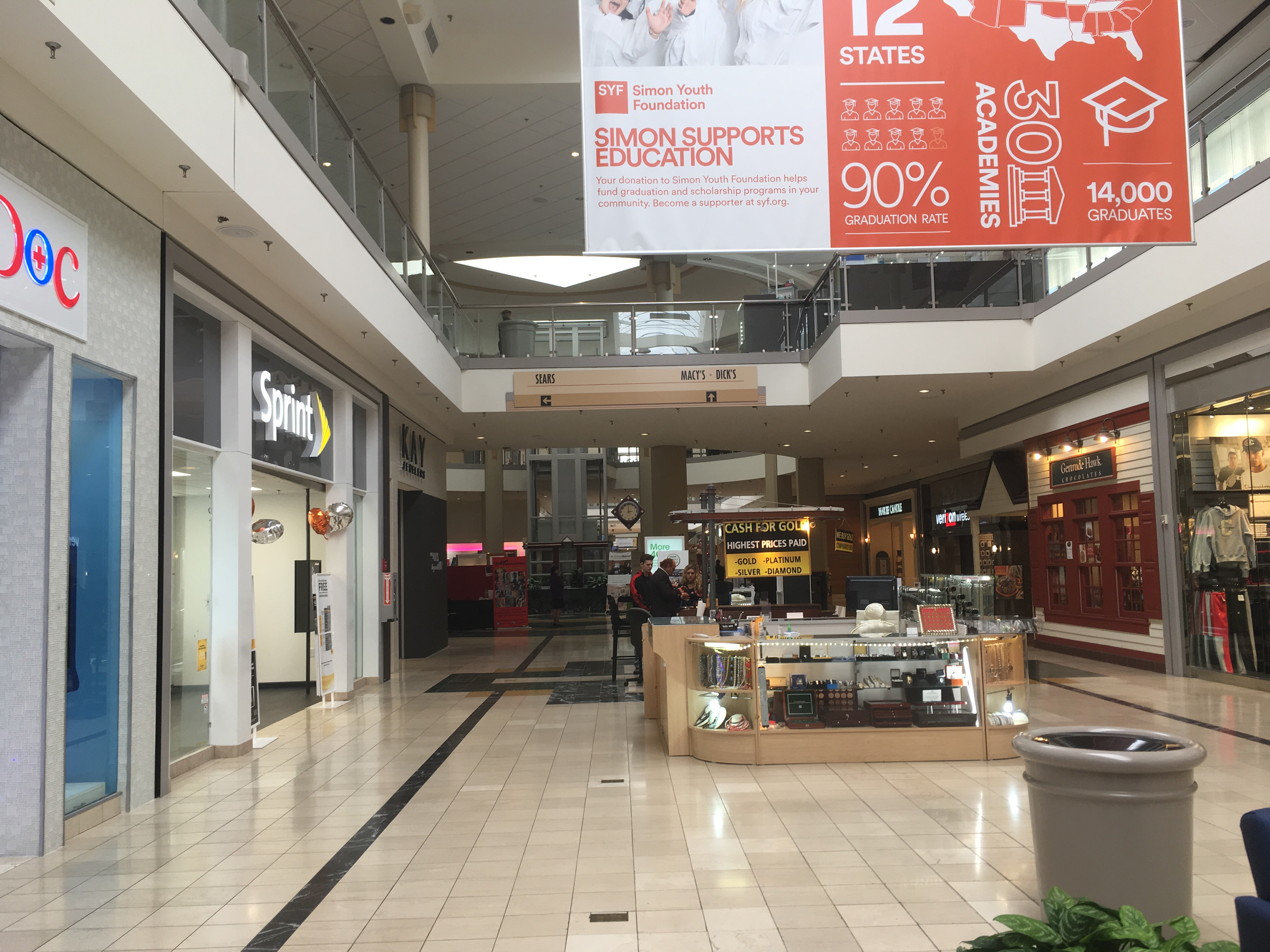
First floor near former Sears, 2018

The Montgomery Mall was built in 1977 by The Kravco Company. In 1986, Bamberger's became Macy's. In 1995, the Wanamaker's store became Hecht's. Hecht's became Strawbridge's in 1997 after its parent company, May Department Stores, acquired the Strawbridge's chain. Simon Property Group acquired the Montgomery Mall in 2003.

Strawbridge's closed in 2006 as a result of Federated Department Stores acquiring May Department Stores, with Boscov's taking over the former store in 2007. The Boscov's store closed in October 2008 as part of their restructuring. Dick's Sporting Goods was also added in 2008. In November 2011, it was announced that a 126,000 sq ft (11,700 m^{2}) Wegmans would replace the vacant Boscov's. This store was planned to be the first Wegmans located in a shopping mall. The former Boscov's store was demolished in the process of constructing the new Wegmans. The Wegmans store opened on November 3, 2013.

In 2014 the Montgomery Mall went under reconstruction. This renovation had a cost of $8 million, and the main purpose was to redesign exterior and entrance, restrooms and upgrade lighting.

On November 7, 2019, it was announced that the Sears store at Montgomery Mall would close as part of a plan to close 96 stores nationwide. Liquidation sales began on December 2, 2019. The store closed in February 2020. On May 3, 2021, during the COVID-19 pandemic, Montgomery County opened a COVID-19 vaccination site in the former Sears space.

In June 2021, the Montgomery Mall was foreclosed upon by Wilmington Trust, trustee for Wells Fargo Commercial Mortgage. The mall was placed into receivership by June 22, with JLL taking over management of the mall, and a $118.78 million judgment was issued against Simon Property Group affiliate Mall at Montgomery, LP by July 12. In order to satisfy the loan, the mall was sold to Kohan Retail Investment Group on November 20, 2021, for $55 million. In 2022, Kohan Retail Investment Group sold the Wegmans site at the mall to Exchange Right for $22.6 million.

In recent years, the Montgomery Mall has seen a decrease in foot traffic and an increase in the vacancy rate. Kohan Retail Investment Group has released no plans regarding the future of the mall. Summit Properties USA later took over ownership of the Montgomery Mall.

As of 2025, with the malls decline in businesses and foot traffic, the mall is considered a "dead mall" by online forums and videos online.

In August 2025, the Dick's Sporting Goods moved out of the mall. The store is now located on 1261 Knapp Road in North Wales. A "Going, Going, Gone," which is the outlet store for Dick's, opened in the mall's location in November 2025.
