= Bradley Vierling =

American football player (born 1986)

No. 60
- Position: Center

Personal information
- Born: May 18, 1986 (age 40); Warminster, Pennsylvania
- Listed height: 6 ft 3 in (1.91 m)
- Listed weight: 290 lb (132 kg)

Career information
- College: Vanderbilt
- NFL draft: 2010: undrafted

Career history
- Pittsburgh Steelers (2010)*; Jacksonville Jaguars (2010–2011)*
- * Offseason or practice squad member only
- Stats at Pro Football Reference

Bradley Lewis Vierling (born May 18, 1986) is an American former football center. He played college football at Vanderbilt. He played in the NFL with the Pittsburgh Steelers and Jacksonville Jaguars.

== Early life ==
Vierling attended Central Bucks East High School as a three-year starter at offensive tackle and also started at defensive tackle and defensive end his during his junior and senior seasons. He was named second-team all-state as a senior and earned letters in basketball and track and field.

== College ==
At Vanderbilt, Vierling was a three time letterman and two-year starter, ending career with 25 consecutive starts. He also served as team captain in final two seasons and was member of 2008-09 SEC Academic Honor Roll. He started all 12 games as a senior and received team's postseason Offensive Lineman of the Year award.

== Professional career ==
=== Pittsburgh Steelers ===
Vierling was originally signed as an undrafted rookie by the Pittsburgh Steelers on April 27, 2010, however the team placed him on waivers on June 15.

=== Jacksonville Jaguars ===
On August 31, 2010, he was signed by the Jacksonville Jaguars as a free agent. He was waived on September 3, however he was later assigned to the club's practice squad on September 6, 2010. On February 7, 2011, he was signed to a contract for the 2011 season. Vierling was released from the practice squad on December 30, 2011.

=== Pittsburgh Steelers (second stint) ===
On April 23, 2012, he was re-signed by the Pittsburgh Steelers.
