= Grant Udinski =

American football coach (born 1996)

Jacksonville Jaguars
- Title: Offensive coordinator

Personal information
- Born: January 12, 1996 (age 30); Doylestown, Pennsylvania, U.S.
- Listed height: 6 ft 3 in (1.91 m)
- Listed weight: 240 lb (109 kg)

Career information
- Position: Defensive end
- High school: Central Bucks West (Doylestown, Pennsylvania)
- College: Davidson (2015); Towson (2016–2018)

Career history
- Baylor (2019) Graduate assistant; Carolina Panthers (2020–2021) Coaching assistant; Minnesota Vikings (2022–2024); Assistant to the head coach & special projects (2022); Assistant quarterbacks coach (2023); Assistant offensive coordinator & assistant quarterbacks coach (2024); Jacksonville Jaguars (2025–present) Offensive coordinator
- Coaching profile at Pro Football Reference

Grant Andrew Udinski (born January 12, 1996) is an American professional football coach and former player who is the offensive coordinator for the Jacksonville Jaguars of the National Football League (NFL). He played college football for the Davidson Wildcats and Towson Tigers and has previously coached for the Baylor Bears, Carolina Panthers, and Minnesota Vikings.

== Early life ==
Grant Udinski was born in January 1996 in Doylestown, Pennsylvania. He attended Central Bucks High School West where he played football and lacrosse, being an all-conference football player and a two-time all-conference lacrosse player. Udinski began his college football career for the Davidson Wildcats where he was a backup tight end as a freshman in 2015, recording one reception for 10 yards.

After his lone season at Davidson, Udinski transferred to the Towson Tigers as a walk-on in 2016, eventually earning a scholarship. He switched to defensive end at Towson and sat out the 2016 season due to transfer rules. Udinski totaled 15 tackles in 2017 and then made 28 tackles and 4.5 sacks as a senior while playing all 12 games. He was also a top student at Towson, being named CoSIDA Academic First-Team All-American, for posting an undergraduate grade-point average (GPA) of 3.94 with a master's level GPA of 4.0.

== Coaching career ==
=== Baylor and Carolina Panthers ===
After Udinski graduated from Towson, he decided to enter coaching. He applied for grad school at Baylor University and was able to land a position as a graduate assistant for the Baylor Bears football team. Udinski worked under head coach Matt Rhule and assisted defensive coordinator Phil Snow. He moved in with Snow during the year, after initially having lived in his car in a Walmart parking lot. Udinski helped the Bears compile an 11–3 record in the 2019 season, advancing to the Big 12 Championship Game.

After one year at Baylor, Udinski followed Matt Rhule to the Carolina Panthers of the NFL in 2020. He held the position of coaching assistant for two years.

=== Minnesota Vikings ===
After receiving a suggestion from tight ends coach Brian Angelichio, Minnesota Vikings head coach Kevin O'Connell hired Udinski in 2022. He initially held the position of assistant to the head coach/special projects. Udinski's initial duties including providing advanced scouting reports on opponents and helping with various tasks in practice. O'Connell called his understanding of football "unbelievable", and in 2023, Udinski was promoted to assistant quarterbacks coach. The following season, he received another promotion to assistant offensive coordinator/assistant quarterbacks coach, while the Star Tribune noted: "His unofficial roles include: mentor to [quarterback] J. J. McCarthy; post-practice pass rusher or receiver for Sam Darnold; advance scout and practice lieutenant for [offensive coordinator] Wes Phillips; complement to QB coach Josh McCown; 'Crazy Grant' to O'Connell's kids; confidant, protégé and occasional comedic target for O'Connell."

=== Jacksonville Jaguars ===
On February 5, 2025, Udinski was hired by the Jacksonville Jaguars to serve as the team's offensive coordinator under new head coach Liam Coen.

On January 27, 2026, following interest from the Cleveland Browns for their head coaching position, Udinski agreed to a contract extension to remain with Jacksonville.
