= Nick Bitsko =

American baseball player (born 2002)

Free agent
- Pitcher
- Born: June 16, 2002 (age 23); Doylestown, Pennsylvania, U.S.
- Bats: Right Throws: Right
- Stats at Baseball Reference

Nicholas Geiger Bitsko (born June 16, 2002) is an American professional baseball player who is a free agent. He was selected 24th overall by the Tampa Bay Rays in the 2020 Major League Baseball draft.

== Amateur career ==
Bitsko attended Central Bucks High School East in Buckingham, Pennsylvania. He committed to play college baseball at the University of Virginia in November 2016.

Bitsko gained notoriety due to the circumstances of his draft stock rising; due to the coronavirus pandemic, few Major League Baseball scouts had seen him pitch, and much of the data collected was collected virtually. He was a top-rated prospect for the 2021 Major League Baseball draft according to Baseball America, but graduated from high school early and reclassified to the class of 2020. In 2020, he was named Pennsylvania's Gatorade Player of the Year.

== Professional career ==
Bitsko was selected 24th overall by the Tampa Bay Rays in the 2020 Major League Baseball draft. He signed with the Rays for a $3 million bonus. He did not play in a game in 2020 due to the cancellation of the minor league season because of the COVID-19 pandemic. On December 1, 2020, Bitsko underwent right shoulder surgery to repair a labrum issue. He did not make an appearance in 2021 while recovering.

Bitsko spent his first professional season in 2022 with the rookie–level Florida Complex League Rays and Single–A Charleston RiverDogs. In 14 games (12 starts) split between the affiliates, he compiled a 1–2 record and 6.23 ERA with 20 strikeouts over 26 innings pitched. Bitsko missed the entirety of the 2023 season as a result of Tommy John surgery.

Bitsko returned to action in 2024 with the FCL Rays, struggling to a 38.57 ERA with 3 strikeouts in 2 1/3 innings pitched over 4 games. He later suffered an injury and was placed on the season–ending injured list in July. Bitsko made six appearances (three starts) for the FCL Rays in 2025, struggling to a 12.60 ERA with four strikeouts over five innings pitched. He was released by the Rays organization on July 25, 2025.
