= Eureka, Pennsylvania =

Unincorporated community in Pennsylvania, US

- Unincorporated community
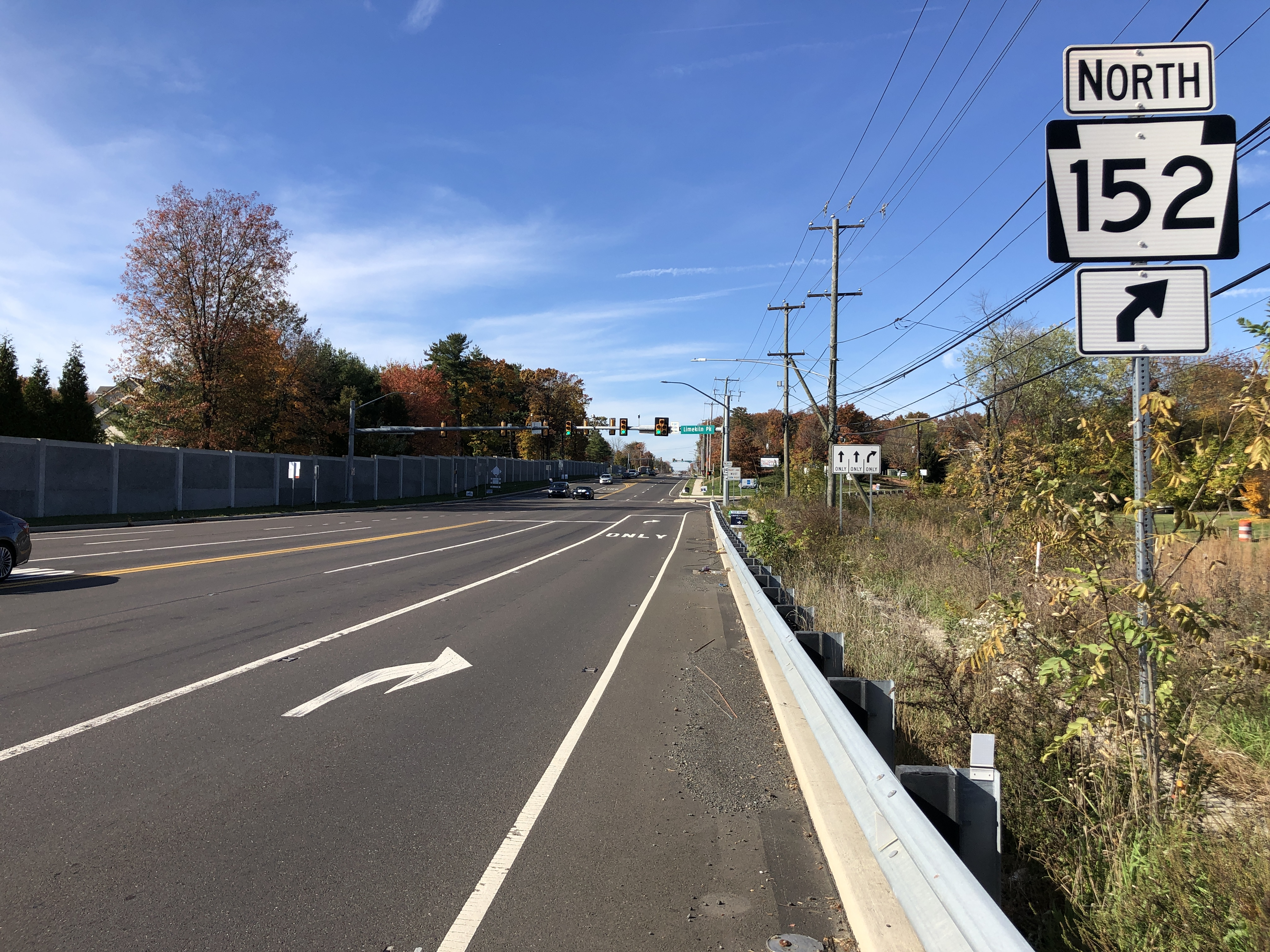
- Village of Eureka at County Line Road and PA 152

- Location within Pennsylvania Location within the United States
- Coordinates: 40°14′40″N 75°11′32″W
- Country: United States
- State: Pennsylvania
- County: Bucks and Montgomery
- Township: Warrington and Montgomery
- Elevation: 308 ft (94 m)
- Time zone: UTC-5 (Eastern (EST))
  - Summer (DST): UTC-4 (EDT)
- Area codes: 215, 267 and 445
- GNIS feature ID: 1203533

Eureka is an unincorporated community in Pennsylvania, United States on the border of Warrington Township in Bucks County and Montgomery Township in Montgomery County. Eureka is at the intersection of Pennsylvania Route 152 and County Line Road.
