= Open-space learning =

Pedagogic methodology

Open-space Learning, or OSL, is a pedagogic methodology. OSL is a transdisciplinary pedagogy that is dependent on the use of physically open spaces - in the sense that tables and chairs are absent - and an open approach to intellectual content and the role of the tutor. Participants in OSL, typically but not exclusively, learn in an 'embodied' way.

== Origins ==
The idea was to apply the practices and theories of the theatrical rehearsal room and the theatrical ensemble to the university curriculum. From these early aspirations developed a pedagogy that has now been used successfully in a dozen departments including Chemistry, Law, Business, English, Mathematics, Philosophy, and Medicine. OSL is a collaborative pedagogic practice and does not, therefore, have a single originator or author.

== Methods ==
In OSL, the workshop is the fundamental activity of pedagogic interaction. Examples of OSL activities include 'still image' or 'tableau', in which participants embody sometimes abstract ideas; 'theory building', in which participants create a narrative, a concept, or a 'theory' from a collection of materials relating to a particular subject; and simulation and roleplay.

== Theory ==
OSL employs methods such as ‘enactive’ learning, ‘kinaesthetic’ learning and the various styles of teaching developed by practitioners such as Augusto Boal and Paulo Freire. Theoretically the work owes its greatest debt to thinkers like Vygotsky, Howard Gardner, and David A. Kolb. In terms of the suggestion that it promotes a style of teaching and learning that seeks to undermine a Cartesian separation of mind and body, its greatest debt is to work in Neuroscience by academics such as Andy Clark, and to phenomenology of the kind developed by Husserl. OSL also has connections to ‘applied drama’, ‘applied theatre’, or ‘applied performance’. OSL can include any kind of learning in which the participants are required to engage with both mind and body in a workshop environment, and promotes a combination of 'mindfulness' and 'playfulness'.

== Technology ==
OSL approaches are often dependent upon removing obstacles and mediations between bodies and minds. They can have a positively disruptive relationship to digital technologies. Where participants in challenging learning situations might ordinarily seek escape into the internet, OSL brings them back to a more immediate and unmediated presence. This has the potential to frame and question digitally-dependent habits, if handled carefully. Technology may then be reintroduced, carefully and with conscious awareness of potential effects, to extend the time and place in which OSL occurs and has effect.
