= Central Bucks School District =

School district in Pennsylvania

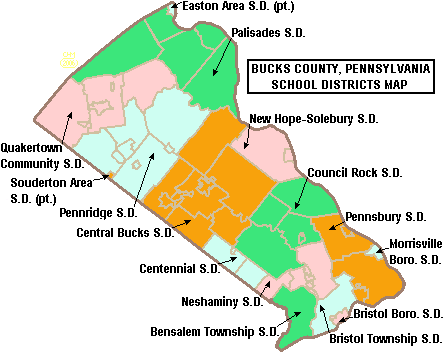

Address
- 20 Welden Drive Doylestown, Bucks, Pennsylvania, 18901; United States

District information
- Type: Public
- Enrollment: 18,400

Other information
- Website: http://www.cbsd.org

Tamanend Football Team
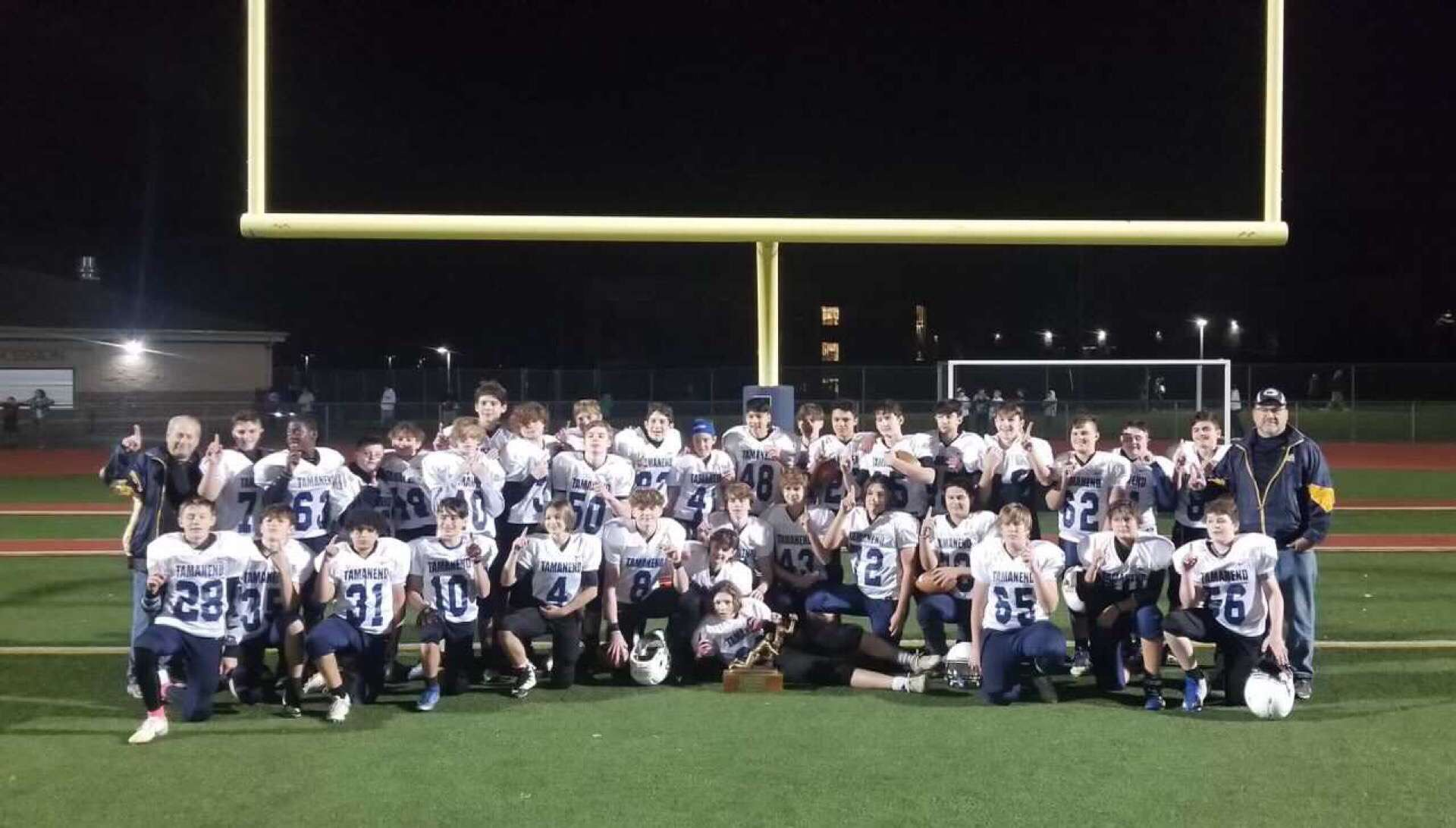
- Tamanend football team, who won the CB (Central Bucks) Middle School Championship in 2021, after defeating the Tohickon Golden Eagles 16-14. Led by Luke Punchello at running back and Cade Crim at quarterback, who went 1-3 with 1 interception. The game closed with 2 game winning sacks by AJ Bouie.

Location
- Warrington, Bucks, Pennsylvania, 18976; United States

The Central Bucks School District (CBSD) is a school district located in Pennsylvania and the third-largest school district in the state. The district covers the Boroughs of Chalfont, Doylestown and New Britain and Buckingham Township, Doylestown Township, Plumstead Township, Warrington Township, Warwick Township, and most of New Britain Township, in Bucks County. More than 3,000 staff serve more than 17,000 students in fifteen elementary schools, five middle schools, and three high schools. There is a 99% graduation rate and over 280 extracurricular activities. Dr. Charles Malone serves as Acting Superintendent. Effective July 1, 2026, Dr. Joanna Wexler will begin her tenure as permanent superintendent.

== History ==
There were partisan political conflicts in the district during the COVID-19 pandemic in Pennsylvania; it is located in Bucks County, which is a swing county in terms of American politics. In 2023, the school board elections resulted in candidates aligned with the Democratic Party taking the entirety of the school board.

The school board has created a realignment plan. Their goals are to introduce full-day kindergarten, shift elementary schools from K-6th to K-5th, shift middle schools from 7-9th to 6th-8th, and shift high schools from 10-12th to 9-12th.

== Schools ==
=== Elementary schools ===
There are fifteen elementary schools in CBSD:

- Bridge Valley Elementary School (2004, Trailblazers)
- Buckingham Elementary School (1955, Mighty Knights)
- Cold Spring Elementary School (1995, Jaguars)
- Doyle Elementary School (1966, Soaring Eagles)
- Gayman Elementary School (1961, Mustangs)
- Groveland Elementary School (2000, Great Grizzlies)
- Jamison Elementary School (1997, Jets)
- John Barclay Elementary School (1965, Patriots)
- Linden Elementary School (1966, Leopards)
- Mill Creek Elementary School (2000, Magic)
- Paul W. Kutz Elementary School (1966, Cougars)
- Pine Run Elementary School (1971, Owls)
- Simon Butler Elementary School (1964, Bears)
- Titus Elementary School (1957, Tigers)
- Warwick Elementary School (1919, Bears)

=== Middle schools ===
There are five middle schools:

- Holicong Middle School (1971, Colonials)
- Lenape Middle School (1957, Lynx)
- Tamanend Middle School (1961, Tigers)
- Tohickon Middle School (2002, Golden Eagles)
- Unami Middle School (1965, Warriors)

=== High schools ===
- Central Bucks High School West ("C.B. West", established in 1952 as Central Bucks High School, located in Doylestown, mascot is Bucks)
- Central Bucks High School East ("C.B. East", established in 1969, located in Buckingham, mascot is Patriots)
- Central Bucks High School South ("C.B. South", established in 2004, located in Warrington, mascot is Titans)

All three Central Bucks high schools have consistently ranked among the best in Pennsylvania, and in 2019, each was ranked in the top 50, according to U.S. News & World Report.

== Curriculum ==
Central Bucks has an integrated curriculum grade by grade.

- Computer Sciences (QUEST), introduced in 1st grade
- Family and Consumer Sciences, introduced in 7th and 8th grade
- Health and Physical Education, introduced in 1st
- Integrated Technology, introduced in 7th grade
- Innovation and Creativity (InC), introduced in 7th grade
- Language Arts, introduced in Kdg
- Library, introduced in Kdg and integrated in 1st grade
- Mathematics, introduced in Kdg and integrated in 1st grade
- Music, introduced in 1st grade
- Reading, introduced in Kdg
- Science, introduced in 2nd grade
- Social Studies, introduced in 1st grade
- Visual Arts, introduced in 1st
- World Languages, introduced in 8th grade

== Community School ==
The district controls the Central Bucks Community School. It offers camps for children and second learning opportunities as well as before and afterschool child care programs at the elementary schools.

== CBTV ==
Central Bucks Television, CBTV, was launched in the spring of 2006. CBTV is managed by Central Bucks School District in cooperation with the James A. Michener Art Museum and the Mercer Museum of the Bucks County Historical Society. The mission of CBTV is to provide the Central Bucks community with educational television programming featuring an emphasis on the area's heritage, arts, cultural life and accomplishments of the students and teachers in our public schools. Some shows include Parent Connections, High School Highlights, World of Guitar, and the Local Scene. Most of the shows are produced and filmed by students at the district's three high schools. It can be seen on Comcast Channel 28 and Verizon FIOS Channel 40. Direct TV does not currently carry CBTV.
