= Central Bucks High School West =

Location
- 375 West Court Street; Doylestown, Pennsylvania 18901; United States; 40°18′18″N 75°08′17″W

Information
- Former name: Doylestown High School
- School type: Public high school public
- Established: 1952
- School district: Central Bucks School District
- School number: (267) 893-2500
- Principal: Lyndell Davis
- Teaching staff: 99.36 (on an FTE basis)
- Grades: 10-12 (realigns to 9-12 in 26-27 year)
- Enrollment: 1,391 (2023-2024)
- Student to teacher ratio: 14.00
- Colors: Black and gold
- Athletics: PIAA
- Mascot: Buckshot
- National ranking: 1,436
- Website: cbwest.cbsd.org

Central Bucks High School - West, often shortened to CB West, is a public high school housing students in grades ten through twelve (realigns to ninth through twelfth grades 2026-27 year). It is located in Doylestown, Pennsylvania and is part of the Central Bucks School District.

During the 2024-2025 school year, CB West had a total enrollment of 1,391. The school's measured FTE for classroom teachers was 99.36 and there was a student–teacher ratio of 14.00. The student population was 51.5% male and 48.5% female. 17.7% of students were economically disadvantaged, 17.3% of students were in special education programs, and 2.5% of students were English-language learners.

Ethnicity of Student Population (2024-2025)
Group	Number of Students	Percent
American Indian or Alaskan Native	1	0.07%
Asian	101	7.26%
Black	11	0.79%
Hispanic	108	7.76%
Native Hawaiian or other Pacific Islander	0	0%
White	1,121	80.59%
Two or more races	49	3.52%

The U.S. News & World Report currently ranks CB West as the 43rd best high school in Pennsylvania. Lyndell Davis is the school's current principal.

== Notable alumni ==
- Lisa Belcastro, politician, former Maryland delegate
- Weyes Blood, singer
- Frank Case, former NFL defensive end for the Kansas City Chiefs
- Joe Conti, former Pennsylvania state representative
- Randy Cuthbert, former NFL running back for the Pittsburgh Steelers
- Fred F. Fielding, former White House Counsel
- Scott Green, former National Football League referee
- Jon Hensley, actor
- Jim Jensen, former professional football player, Miami Dolphins
- Shelby Labs, politician
- Tyler Lepley, actor
- James A. Michener, author (graduated from Doylestown High School)
- Mike Pettine, assistant head coach, Minnesota Vikings
- Pink, singer
- Mike Senica, ARCA Racing Series and NASCAR driver
- Michael Smerconish, radio personality
- Chloe Timberg, pole vaulter
- Kevin Ward, former professional baseball player for the San Diego Padres
- Katrina Weidman, paranormal investigator
- Grant Udinski, offensive coordinator, Jacksonville Jaguars
