= Montgomery Township, Montgomery County, Pennsylvania =

Township in Pennsylvania, US

Montgomery Township
- Township
- The Joseph Ambler Inn in Montgomery Township

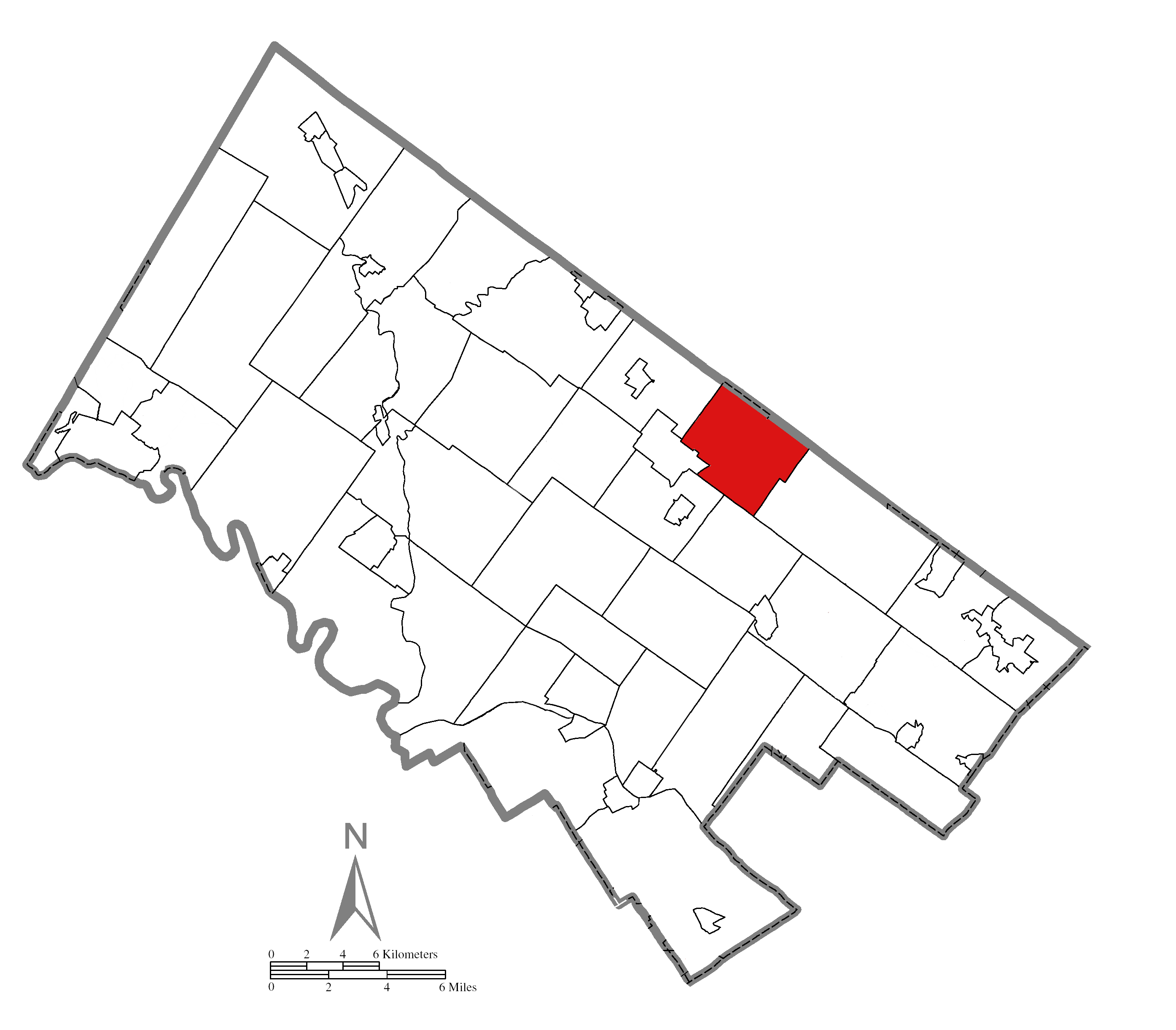
- Location of Montgomery Township in Montgomery County

- Location of Montgomery Township in Pennsylvania
- Coordinates: 40°15′03″N 75°15′05″W
- Country: United States
- State: Pennsylvania
- County: Montgomery
- Incorporated: 1714

Government
  - Body: Board of Supervisors

Area
  - Total: 10.63 sq mi (27.5 km^{2})
  - Land: 10.63 sq mi (27.5 km^{2})
  - Water: 0.00 sq mi (0 km^{2})
- Elevation: 433 ft (132 m)

Population (2020)
  - Total: 25,862
  - Estimate (2025): 26,210 ▲
  - Density: 2,433/sq mi (939.4/km^{2})
- Time zone: UTC-5 (EST)
  - Summer (DST): UTC-4 (EDT)
- Postal Code: 19454
- Area codes: 215, 267 and 445
- Website: www.montgomerytwp.org

Montgomery Township is a township in Montgomery County, Pennsylvania. It is the location of the Montgomery Mall, a regional shopping mall serving the Route 309 corridor of the Philadelphia suburbs. Much of Montgomery Township's development is suburban in character, with newer tract houses and strip shopping centers. Homes in Montgomery Township have North Wales and Lansdale (although the township is distinct from those boroughs) addresses, but businesses that are located within the township boundaries are given the Montgomeryville ZIP Code. The township is in the North Penn School District and is part of the North Penn Valley region that is centered around the borough of Lansdale.

Montgomery Township is the largest municipality in the North Penn area, the ninth largest municipality in Montgomery County, and the 59th largest municipality in Pennsylvania. Montgomery Township has its downtown along PA 309 in Montgomery Square. The township is largely developed with many suburban developments. It has an area of 10.7 square miles and an estimated population of 26,210. It was incorporated on May 17, 1714.

== History ==
Montgomery Township was incorporated in 1714. Alexander Edwards was one of the first settlers. Originally from Wales, he died in 1712 and described himself in his will as "of Montgomery", showing that the township had been created before that time. When old Philadelphia County was partitioned on September 10, 1784, Montgomery Township was included in Montgomery County. There were many Welsh within Montgomery and its surrounding townships, descendants of those who left Wales in the aftermath of the English Civil War. The new county was likely named for the historic county of Montgomeryshire, Wales, where many of the earliest Welsh settlers hailed from.

The Knapp Farm was listed on the National Register of Historic Places in 1976.

== Geography ==
According to the U.S. Census Bureau, the township has a total area of 10.7 square miles (27.6 km^{2}), all land. It is in the Delaware watershed and is drained mainly by the Little Neshaminy Creek. Its villages include Christy (also in Bucks County), Colmar (also in Hatfield Township), Eureka (also in Bucks County and Horsham Township), Fortuna (also in Hatfield Township), Montgomery Square, and Montgomeryville. Pennsylvania Route 63 (Welsh Road) follows a portion of the southwestern boundary of the township.

=== Neighboring municipalities ===
- Horsham Township (southeast)
- Lower Gwynedd Township (south)
- Upper Gwynedd Township (southwest)
- Lansdale (west)
- Hatfield Township (northwest)
- New Britain Township, Bucks County (north)
- Warrington Township, Bucks County (northeast)

=== Climate ===
Montgomery Township has a hot-summer humid continental climate (Dfa) and the hardiness zones are 6b and 7a with the dividing line on a ridge at roughly Stump Road. The average monthly temperature in Montgomeryville ranges from 29.9 °F in January to 74.3 °F in July.

== Demographics ==
Historical population
Census	Pop.	Note	%±
1930	850		—
1940	951		11.9%
1950	1,566		64.7%
1960	2,700		72.4%
1970	3,936		45.8%
1980	5,718		45.3%
1990	12,179		113.0%
2000	22,025		80.8%
2010	24,790		12.6%
2020	25,862		4.3%
2025 (est.)	26,210		1.3%

As of the 2010 census, the township was 76.7% White, 4.6% Black or African American, 0.1% Native American, 16.6% Asian, and 1.6% were two or more races. 2.2% of the population were of Hispanic or Latino ancestry.

As of the census of 2000, there were 22,025 people, 7,926 households, and 6,055 families residing in the township. The population density was 2,067.1 inhabitants per square mile (798.1/km^{2}). There were 8,053 housing units at an average density of 755.8 per square mile (291.8/km^{2}). The racial makeup of the township was 85.60% White, 3.87% African American, 0.07% Native American, 9.19% Asian, 0.01% Pacific Islander, 0.28% from other races, and 0.98% from two or more races. Hispanic or Latino of any race were 1.27% of the population.

There were 7,926 households, out of which 39.9% had children under the age of 18 living with them, 68.5% were married couples living together, 5.9% had a female householder with no husband present, and 23.6% were non-families. 19.7% of all households were made up of individuals, and 6.5% had someone living alone who was 65 years of age or older. The average household size was 2.74 and the average family size was 3.20.

In the township, the population was spread out, with 28.4% under the age of 18, 4.0% from 18 to 24, 34.5% from 25 to 44, 21.8% from 45 to 64, and 11.3% who were 65 years of age or older. The median age was 37 years. For every 100 females, there were 93.3 males. For every 100 females age 18 and over, there were 89.2 males.

The median income for a household in the township was $78,953, and the median income for a family was $88,209 (these figures had risen to $84,026 and $102,174 respectively as of a 2007 estimate). Males had a median income of $61,260 versus $40,858 for females. The per capita income for the township was $32,349. About 1.5% of families and 2.0% of the population were below the poverty line, including 1.5% of those under age 18 and 3.7% of those age 65 or over.

== Government and politics ==
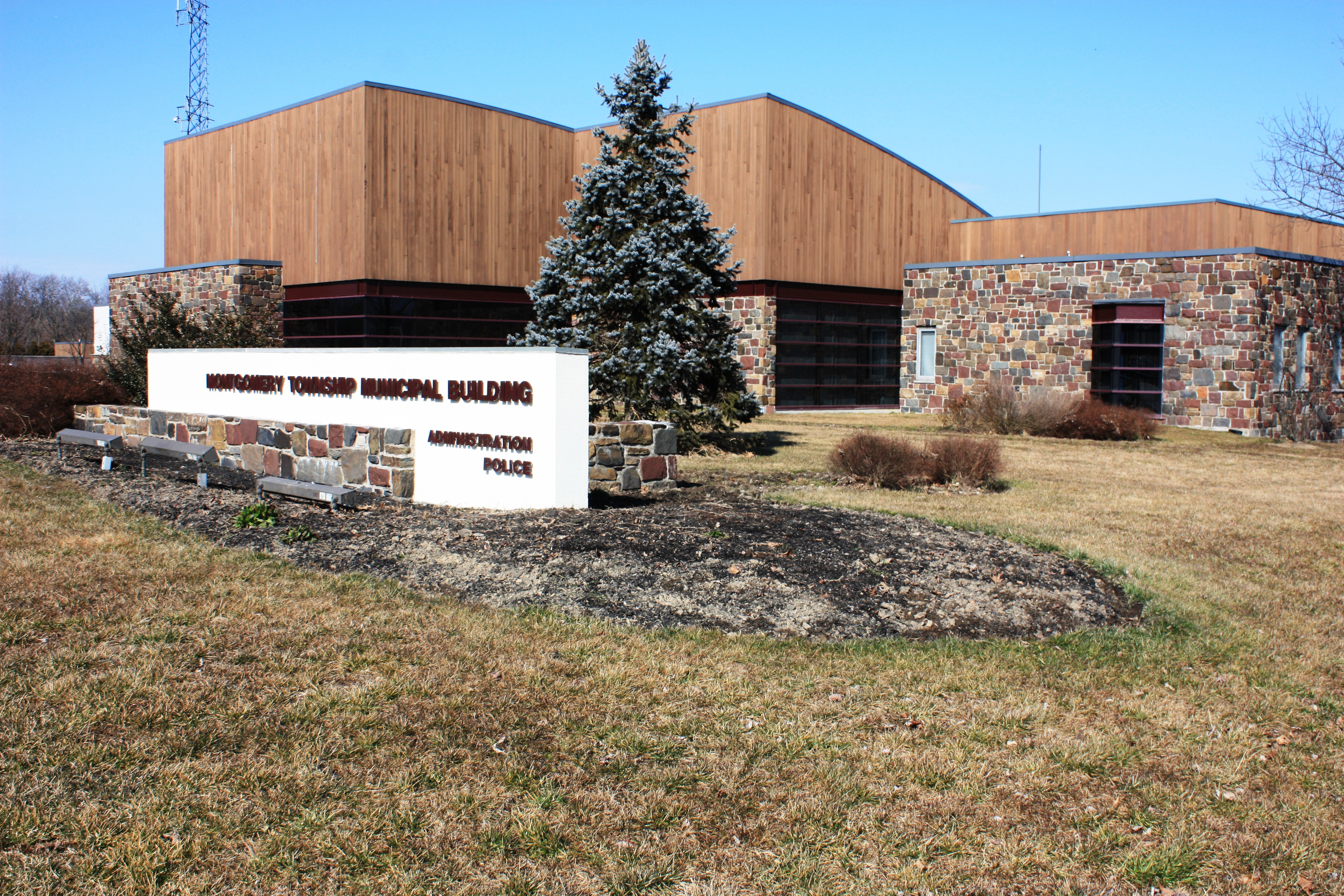
Montgomery Township municipal building

Montgomery Township is governed by a five-member Board of Supervisors. As of 2021, the Board of Supervisors is composed of:

- Chairwoman, Audrey Ware-Jones
- Vice-Chairwoman, Annette M. Long (Mendez)
- Candyce Fleuhr Chimera
- Tanya Bamford
- Beth A. Staab

Presidential elections results
Year	Republican	Democratic
2024	40.0% 6,682	59.0% 9,854
2020	38.3% 6,376	60.3% 10,047
2016	40.1% 5,584	56.2% 7,833
2012	47.0% 6,084	52.2% 6,755
2008	42.9% 5,557	56.5% 7,316
2004	48.9% 5,946	50.8% 6,173
2000	49.1% 4,870	48.7% 4,829
1996	44.2% 3,589	45.8% 3,715
1992	43.9% 3,031	35.8% 2,468

== Transportation ==
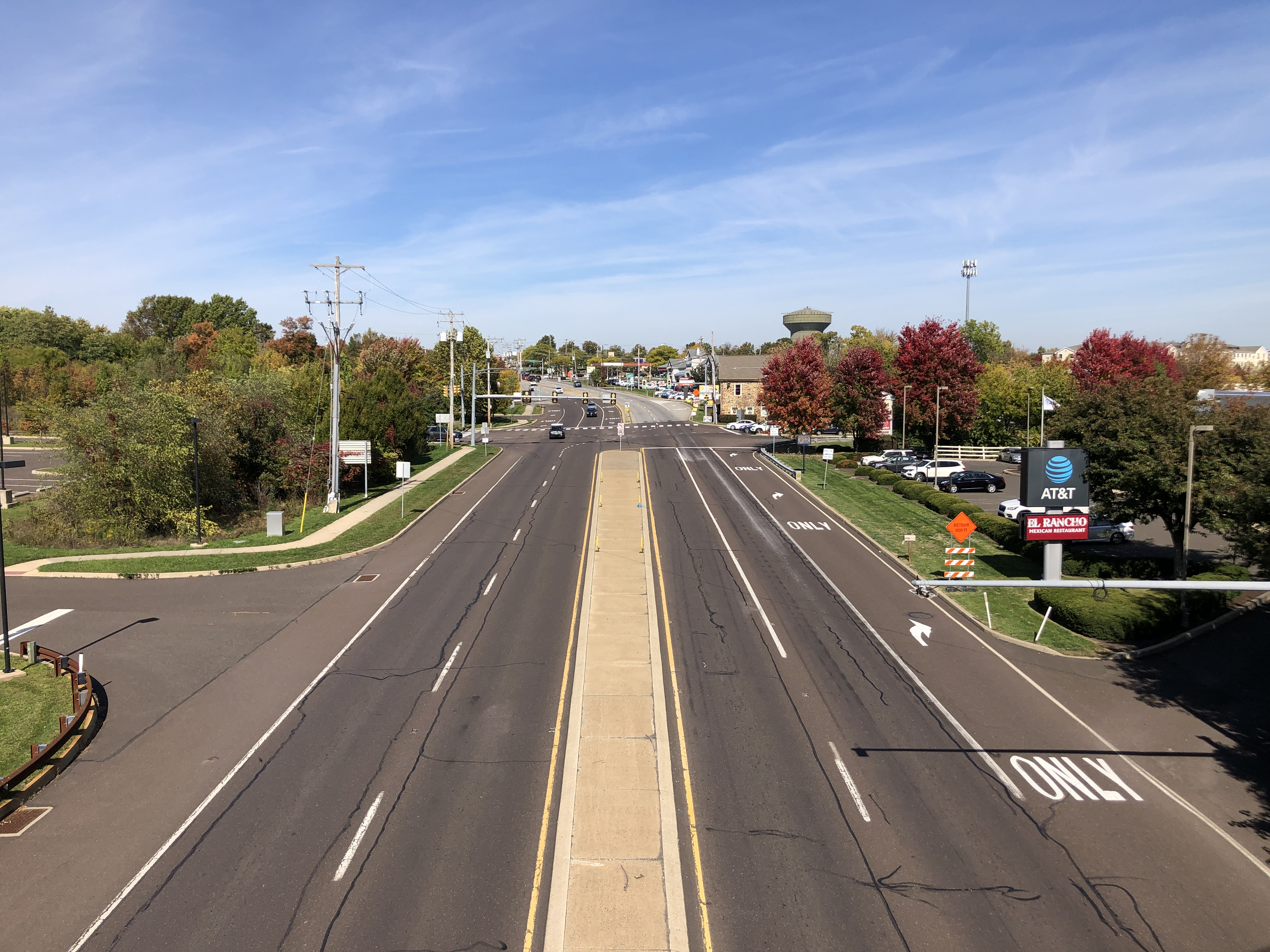
PA 309 northbound at US 202 in Montgomery Township

As of 2020 there were 97.28 miles (156.56 km) of public roads in Montgomery Township, of which 23.36 miles (37.59 km) were maintained by the Pennsylvania Department of Transportation (PennDOT) and 97.28 miles (156.56 km) were maintained by the township.

Major roads in Montgomery Township include U.S. Route 202, which passes southwest–northeast through the center of the township along an expressway-grade parkway; Pennsylvania Route 309, which runs north–south through the center of the township along Bethlehem Pike; U.S. Route 202 Business, which passes southwest–northeast through the township along Dekalb Pike, PA 309, and Doylestown Road; Pennsylvania Route 63, which runs northwest–southeast along the southwestern border of the township on Welsh Road; Pennsylvania Route 152, which passes north–south through the eastern corner of the township along Limekiln Pike; Pennsylvania Route 463, which runs northwest–southeast through the center of the township along Cowpath Road and Horsham Road; and County Line Road, which runs northwest–southeast along the northeastern border of the township with Bucks County. SEPTA provides bus service to Montgomery Township along Suburban Bus routes 94, 96, and 132, all of which stop at the Montgomery Mall.

== Public safety ==
- Ambulance Corps: Volunteer Medical Service Corps of Lansdale
- Montgomery Township Police Department
- Fire Department of Montgomery Township

== Notable people ==
- Winfield Scott Hancock, U.S. Army officer and Democratic nominee for President of the United States in 1880
