= Isaac S. Flint =

Isaac S. Flint (November 3, 1819 – April 6, 1893) was an Underground Railroad station master, lecturer, farmer, and a teacher. He saved Samuel D. Burris, a conductor on the Underground Railroad, from being sold into slavery after having been caught helping runaway enslaved people.

== Early life ==
Isaac Flint was born on November 3, 1819, the son of Abigail Harriet née Delesdernier (1798–1865) and Isaac Flint (1792–1865), in Schoharie County, New York, near Lake Otsego, New York. He was given a good education.

Flint was the eldest of ten children: Isaac, Mary, Frances, Christopher, John, Luther, Edward, Olivia, Harriet, and Almira. His brother was John Thompson Flint, who was an attorney, Confederate veteran, legislator in Texas, and a banker.

== Marriage and children ==
He married Edith Pusey on April 11, 1846, in West Grove, Pennsylvania. (Note: She was married in 1845 and was the daughter of Joshua L. Pusey of Wilmington, Delaware. She is also said to be the daughter of Jonah and Hannah Pennock Pusey and the sister of Joshua L. Pusey.) She was born on December 21, 1812, in London Grove, Pennsylvania. Her friends were the daughters of Thomas Garrett, Benjamin Webb, and Ziba Ferris, who met for literary discussions and readings. In 1838, she attended a lecture at the Pennsylvania Hall in Philadelphia when it was attacked by a mob. She was an abolitionist and a teacher, using new teaching techniques from New England.

The couple settled in Chester County, Pennsylvania, where Flint was a farmer. In 1850, Flint continued that occupation in Harford, Maryland with his wife and 3-year-old daughter, Mary. With them were two carpenters, one of whom was Luther Flint, and a laborer. Their children, were Mary E. (wife of Isaac W. Kinderdine), Horace, Pennock Pusey, and Rachel (who married a Mr. Ortt). Their son Horace was not listed on the census with the family in 1860. At some point, Flint was a member of the Friends Meetinghouse in Wilmington, Delaware. In 1866, Edith and Isaac—as well as daughters Rachel and Mary—were founding members of the First Unitarian Society of Wilmington.

== Career ==
He moved to Philadelphia to find work as a teacher around 1840, about the time that he attained the age of majority. After he failed to find a position in Philadelphia, he walked down a country road and talked to a farmer about the need for a teacher in the area. After some discussion, he was given a job that he held for several years. He taught arithmetic, grammar, geography, algebra, geology, physiology, natural philosophy, and astronomy. Flint taught Frisby T. Cooper, who later went on to run the school and ultimately become a minister. The school was established under the African School Society in the state of Delaware.

He and his brother-in-law Pennock Pusey bought a large tract of land in Cecil County, Maryland. The soil was worn out and they used guano to enrich the soil. In 1854, Flint moved to Wilmington, where he became a teacher of black children in a little Quaker schoolhouse between Seventh and Eighth Streets on Orange Street. In 1860, he was a commission merchant in Wilmington. Five years later he was a grocer at 728 Market Street.

He served during the American Civil War in an emergency regiment that guarded the Philadelphia, Wilmington and Baltimore Railroad. After the war, he taught at a school established in Pennsylvania for orphaned children of deceased United States Colored Troops in Bucks County, Pennsylvania. It was located near Trenton, New Jersey on the Delaware River.

== Anti-Slavery activities ==
Flint was an abolitionist and Underground Railroad station master, who was connected with Thomas Garrett. He gave courageous, forceful speeches against slavery. On the streets, he was stoned or attacked for his anti-slavery stance in Wilmington and in Ohio, where he was sent by the anti-slavery society. In 1845, he held a series of Anti-Slavery Meetings in New York.

His home in Woodlawn was a station on the Underground Railroad. He hallowed out an area under his kitchen floor as a hiding place for runaway enslaved people, which was used successfully several times when law men followed runaways to his house.

=== Samuel D. Burris ===
Flint purchased the freedom of Samuel D. Burris, a conductor on the Underground Railroad and free African American, when he was sentenced to be sold into slavery for assisting freedom seekers in Kent County. Living in Wilmington at the time, Flint came to Dover where Burris was to be auctioned. He was not known by Burris or the slavetraders. He offered the highest bid in the auction, and was then given a bill of sale for Burris. Unaware that he was not a slave buyer, Flint whispered in Burris's ear that he had been bought with abolition gold. Burris was then reunited with his family in Philadelphia.

Flint's abhorrence of Slavery combined with his fearlessness, cool bearing, and perfect knowledge from what he had read of the pages of traders at slave sales, without question admirably fitted him to play the part of a trader for the time being.

— William Still, The Underground Rail Road

== Later years ==
He moved to Germantown, Philadelphia, Pennsylvania about 1892 to be close to his children. He died April 6, 1893, in Germantown. His memorial service was conducted by Rev. William H. Johnson of the First Unitarian Church of Wilmington. He was buried at the Wilmington and Brandywine Cemetery in Wilmington, Delaware. His wife Edith died on September 7, 1896, at her daughter's house in Germantown. She was also buried at Wilmington and Brandywine Cemetery.
