= U.S. Route 202 in Pennsylvania =

US Highway in Pennsylvania

U.S. Route 202
- US 202 highlighted in red

Route information
- Maintained by PennDOT, Municipality of Norristown, and DRJTBC
- Length: 59.002 mi (94.955 km)
- Existed: 1934–present
- Tourist routes: U.S. Route 202 Parkway Scenic Byway

Major junctions
- South end: US 202 at the Delaware state line near Chadds Ford
- US 1 / US 322 in Concordville; PA 3 near West Chester; US 322 near West Chester; PA 100 near West Chester; US 30 in Glenloch; PA 29 near Malvern; US 422 in King of Prussia; I-76 in King of Prussia; PA 309 in Montgomeryville; PA 611 in Doylestown
- North end: US 202 at the New Jersey state line in New Hope

Location
- Country: United States
- State: Pennsylvania
- Counties: Delaware, Chester, Montgomery, Bucks

Highway system
- United States Numbered Highway System; List; Special; Divided; Pennsylvania State Route System; Interstate; US; State; Scenic; Legislative
← PA 201	→ PA 202

U.S. Route 202 (US 202) is a US Highway running from New Castle, Delaware, northeast to Bangor, Maine. In the U.S. state of Pennsylvania, the route runs for 59 miles (95 km), from the Delaware state line in Bethel Township, Delaware County, to the New Hope–Lambertville Toll Bridge over the Delaware River in Solebury Township, where the route crosses into New Jersey. The highway runs through the western and northern suburbs of the Philadelphia metropolitan area, and serves as a toll-free bypass around the city, avoiding the busy traffic and congestion on Interstate 95 (I-95). It is signed north–south and follows a general southwest–northeast direction through the state.

== Route description ==
=== Delaware County ===
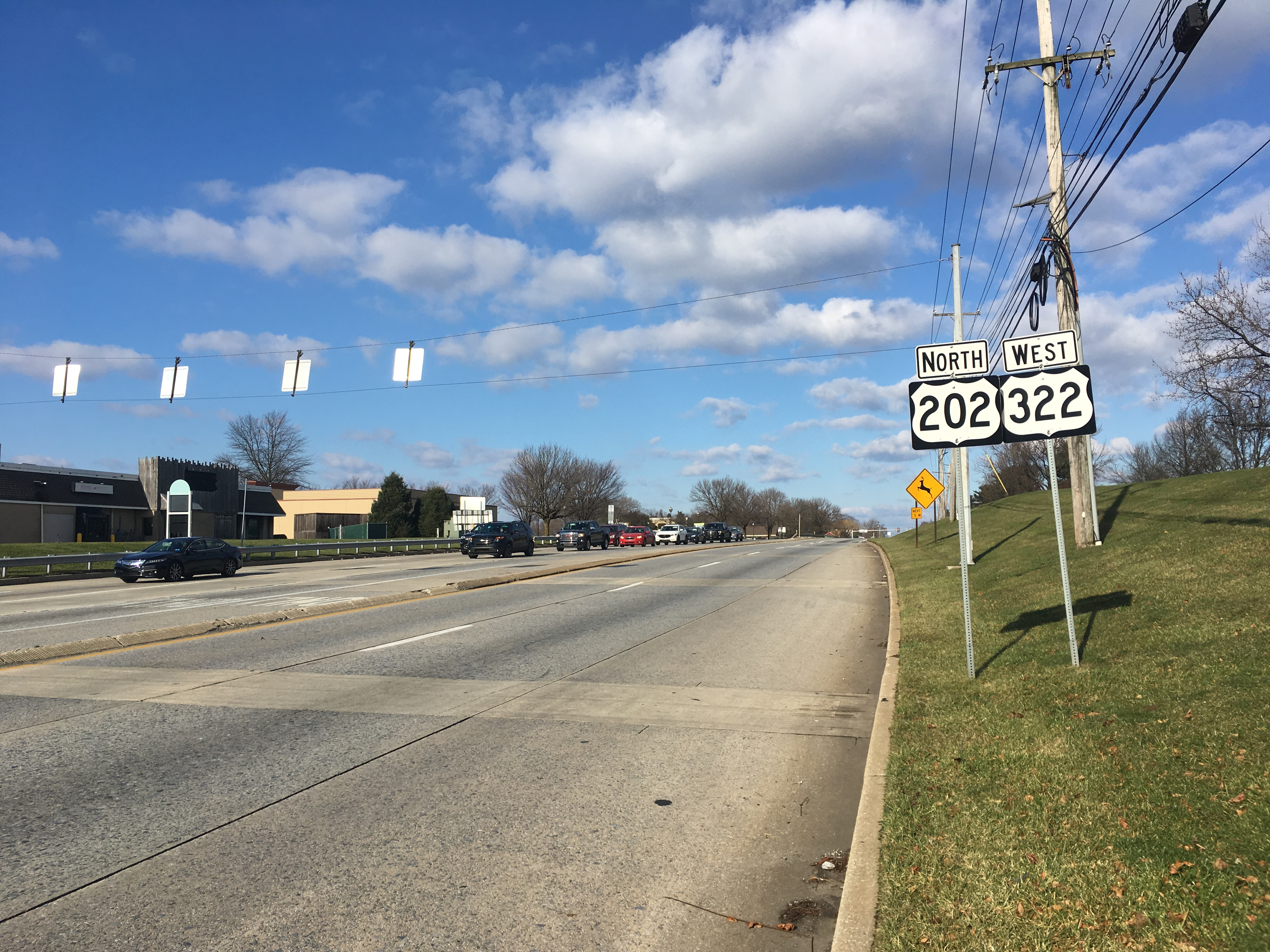
US 202 northbound/US 322 westbound past US 1 in Painters Crossing

US 202 enters Pennsylvania from Delaware in Bethel Township, Delaware County, heading north on four-lane divided Wilmington–West Chester Pike. The road soon crosses into Concord Township and continues past commercial development, coming to an intersection with the western terminus of PA 491 and Beaver Valley Road in the community of Johnsons Corners. Past this intersection, the route splits into a one-way pair carrying two lanes in each direction and heads northwest past businesses and some homes, reaching a junction with Smithbridge Road in the community of Elam. Both directions of US 202 rejoin and the route continues north as a four-lane divided highway into Chadds Ford Township, where it becomes a five-lane road with a center left-turn lane and runs through more commercial areas. The road passes through the community of Brandywine Summit and transitions into a four-lane divided highway again, curving northwest and forming the border between Chadds Ford Township to the southwest and Concord Township to the northeast. The route comes to an intersection with US 1/US 322 (Baltimore Pike) in the community of Painters Crossing, where US 322 heads east along US 1 and turns northwest for a concurrency with US 202. US 202/US 322 heads northwest along a four-lane divided highway between businesses to the southwest and an office park to the northeast. The two routes come to an intersection with Oakland Road that has a southbound jughandle. The road continues into a mix of fields and commercial development and fully enters Chadds Ford Township, running a short distance to the west of the border with Thornbury Township. The two routes pass more development before reaching an intersection with Brintons Bridge Road/Dilworthtown Road.

=== Chester County ===
Upon crossing Brintons Bridge Road/Dilworthtown Road, US 202/US 322 enters Birmingham Township in Chester County and continues northwest along four-lane divided Wilmington Pike past businesses a short distance west of the Thornbury Township border. The road crosses into Thornbury Township and passes between suburban residential neighborhoods. The two routes continue into business areas and reach an intersection with PA 926 in the community of Darlington Corners. Upon crossing PA 926, US 202/US 322 heads into Westtown Township and passes between farmland to the west and wooded residential neighborhoods to the east. The road runs past more homes and commercial establishments, coming to a jughandle-controlled intersection at Stetson Middle School Drive/Skiles Boulevard. Past here, two routes head north-northwest through wooded areas of residences and businesses.

US 202/US 322 comes to a trumpet interchange with the south end of the West Chester Bypass, which bypasses the borough of West Chester to the east. At this point, US 202/US 322 heads northeast onto the four-lane divided West Chester Bypass into West Goshen Township, while US 322 Bus. continues north (west) on South High Street into West Chester, providing access to the West Chester University campus. US 202/US 322 follows the bypass past industrial parks to an at-grade intersection with South Matlack Street, at which point the bypass becomes a four-lane freeway. The highway curves north and passes over the West Chester Railroad. Past this, the freeway comes to a diamond interchange at Westtown Road. US 202/US 322 continues north near residential neighborhoods and reaches a partial cloverleaf interchange with PA 3. Following this, the two routes come to a partial cloverleaf interchange serving Paoli Pike. The freeway continues near residential and commercial development before reaching a northbound exit and southbound entrance where US 322 splits from US 202 to continue west along the two-lane undivided West Chester Bypass to the north of West Chester.

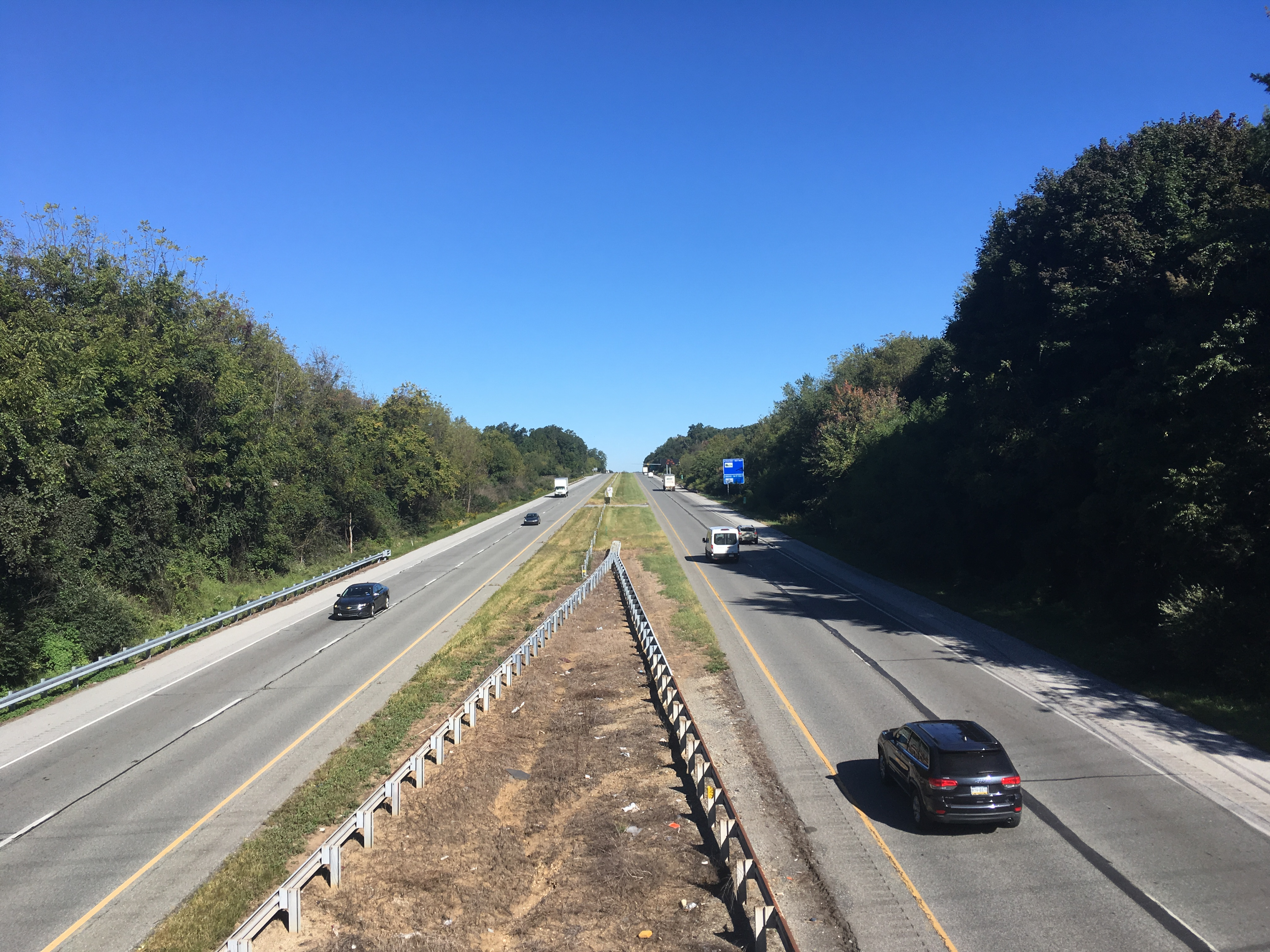
US 202 freeway northbound in East Goshen Township

Past the US 322 split, US 202 heads north as an unnamed four-lane freeway near business parks and passes to the west of Brandywine Airport, at which point it crosses the East Branch Chester Creek as it comes to a northbound exit and southbound entrance with the southern terminus of the PA 100 freeway. The route heads north-northeast near more business parks before it runs near wooded neighborhoods and reaches a diamond interchange at Boot Road. Following this, the freeway crosses into East Goshen Township and curves to the north-northwest, entering West Whiteland Township and passing through more wooded areas with nearby homes and commercial development. US 202 bends to the northeast as it enters the Great Valley and comes to a bridge over Amtrak's Keystone Corridor railroad line and an abandoned railroad line before it reaches an interchange with US 30 and the eastern terminus of US 30 Bus. at Lincoln Highway in the community of Glenloch. At this interchange, US 30 heads west on the Exton Bypass freeway and east on at-grade Lincoln Highway while US 30 Bus. heads west along Lincoln Highway. From here, US 202 widens to six lanes and crosses into East Whiteland Township. The highway heads to the northwest of the community of Frazer, running through a mix of fields, woods, and development. The freeway passes over the Chester Valley Trail before it comes to a diamond interchange at PA 401, where it also crosses Valley Creek. After this interchange, the route bends east and runs through wooded areas, heading across the creek again.

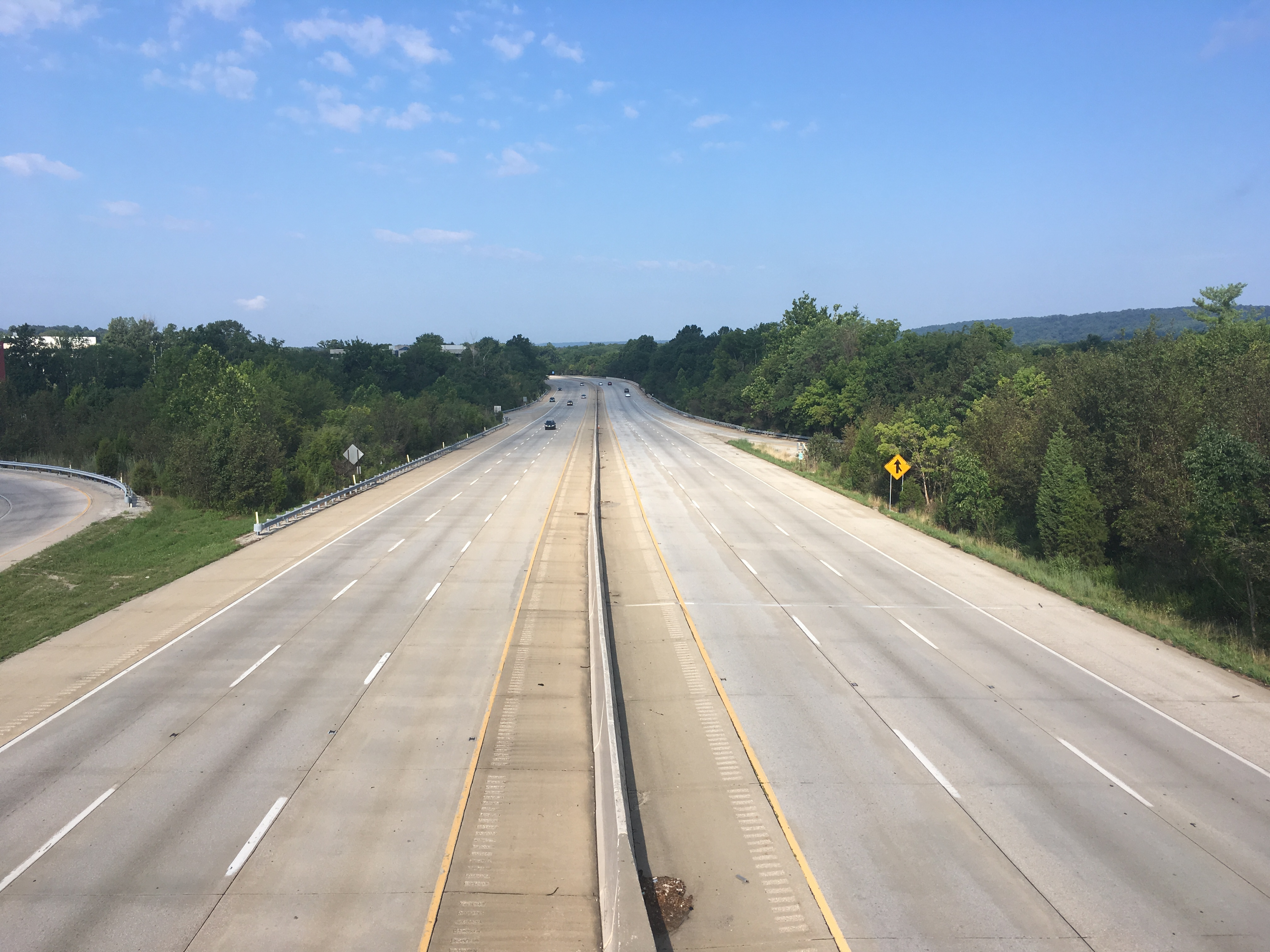
US 202 freeway southbound at Chesterbrook Boulevard in Chesterbrook

US 202 reaches an interchange with PA 29 in a commercial area to the south of the Great Valley Corporate Center and the Penn State Great Valley university campus. Following this, the freeway continues east-northeast near commercial development before crossing into Tredyffrin Township and running through wooded areas with nearby residential neighborhoods, with the Chester Valley Trail parallel to the south. Farther east, the route comes to a northbound exit and southbound entrance at Swedesford Road that provides access to PA 252. US 202 turns northeast and runs near business parks, curving east to reach a partial cloverleaf interchange at Chesterbrook Boulevard south of the community of Chesterbrook. A short distance later, the freeway has a southbound exit to southbound PA 252 and northbound entrance from northbound PA 252. The route heads east, with PA 252 closely parallel to the south, between residential areas to the north and business areas to the south. US 202 comes to an interchange serving PA 252 and North Valley Forge Road, with PA 252 heading north away from US 202. The freeway is paralleled with Swedesford Road as a frontage road on each side and the Chester Valley Trail to the south, with a northbound exit providing access to West Valley Road. Following this, the frontage roads end and the route runs east-northeast past office parks with the trail to the south. The freeway comes to a northbound exit providing access to eastbound I-76 and Devon Park Drive and a southbound entrance from Swedesford Road. A short distance later, US 202 reaches a trumpet interchange with the eastern terminus of the US 422 freeway. This interchange also has access from southbound US 202 to Swedesford Road via the ramp to US 422 westbound as well as from Devon Park Drive to northbound US 202 via the ramp from US 422 eastbound.

=== Montgomery County ===
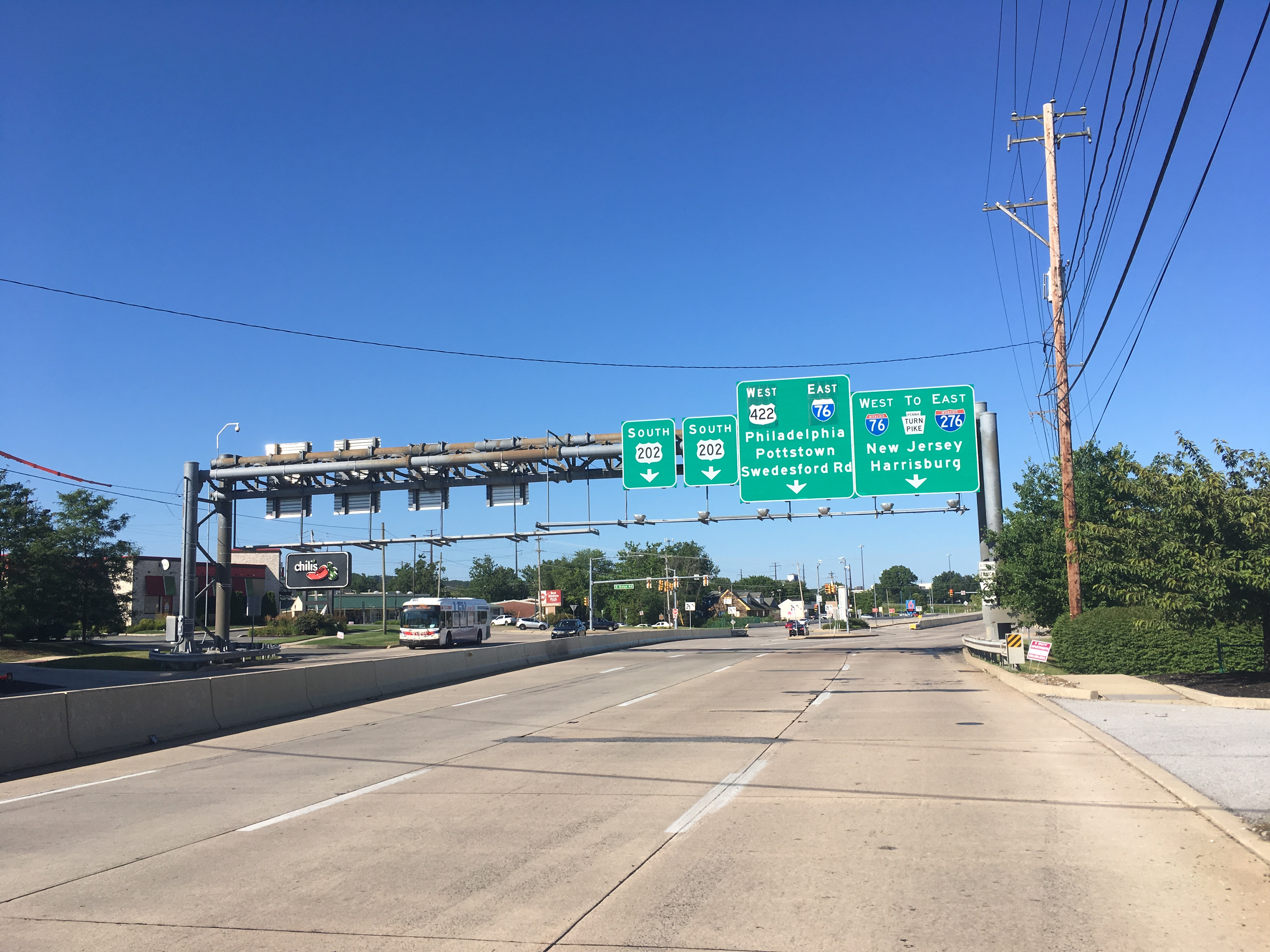
US 202 southbound approaching Gulph Road in King of Prussia

Past the US 422 interchange, the US 202 freeway enters Upper Merion Township in Montgomery County and continues into the community of King of Prussia. The route runs past office parks and businesses south of the Village at Valley Forge, a residential and retail development which contains the King of Prussia Town Center lifestyle center, with the southbound collector-distributor ramp to westbound US 422 and Swedesford Road parallel to the southbound lanes. The freeway comes to a modified cloverleaf interchange with I-76. This interchange provides all connections between I-76 and US 202, with the ramp from northbound US 202 to eastbound I-76 splitting from US 202 south of the US 422 interchange. In the southbound direction, a parallel collector-distributor ramp splits off to serve eastbound I-76, westbound US 422, and Swedesford Road. I-76 heads west to provide access to the Pennsylvania Turnpike at the western terminus of I-276 at the Valley Forge interchange and east to provide access to the city of Philadelphia. Following this interchange, the freeway ends and US 202 becomes West Dekalb Pike, an eight-lane divided highway with at-grade intersections. The route heads into business areas and intersects Gulph Road, at which point it passes southeast of the King of Prussia Mall. At the junction with Mall Boulevard/Shaffer Road, the roadway reduces to five lanes with two northbound lanes and three southbound lanes. Following the Allendale Road/Forge Road intersection, the divided road narrows to four lanes, with two lanes in each direction. The route runs between commercial establishments to the northwest and residential areas to the southeast, coming to a bridge over the Pennsylvania Turnpike (I-276). US 202 continues southeast of a neighborhood and heads past more businesses, reaching an intersection with Henderson Road. From here, the route becomes East Dekalb Pike and runs through more commercial areas, crossing the Chester Valley Trail and bending to the north-northeast.

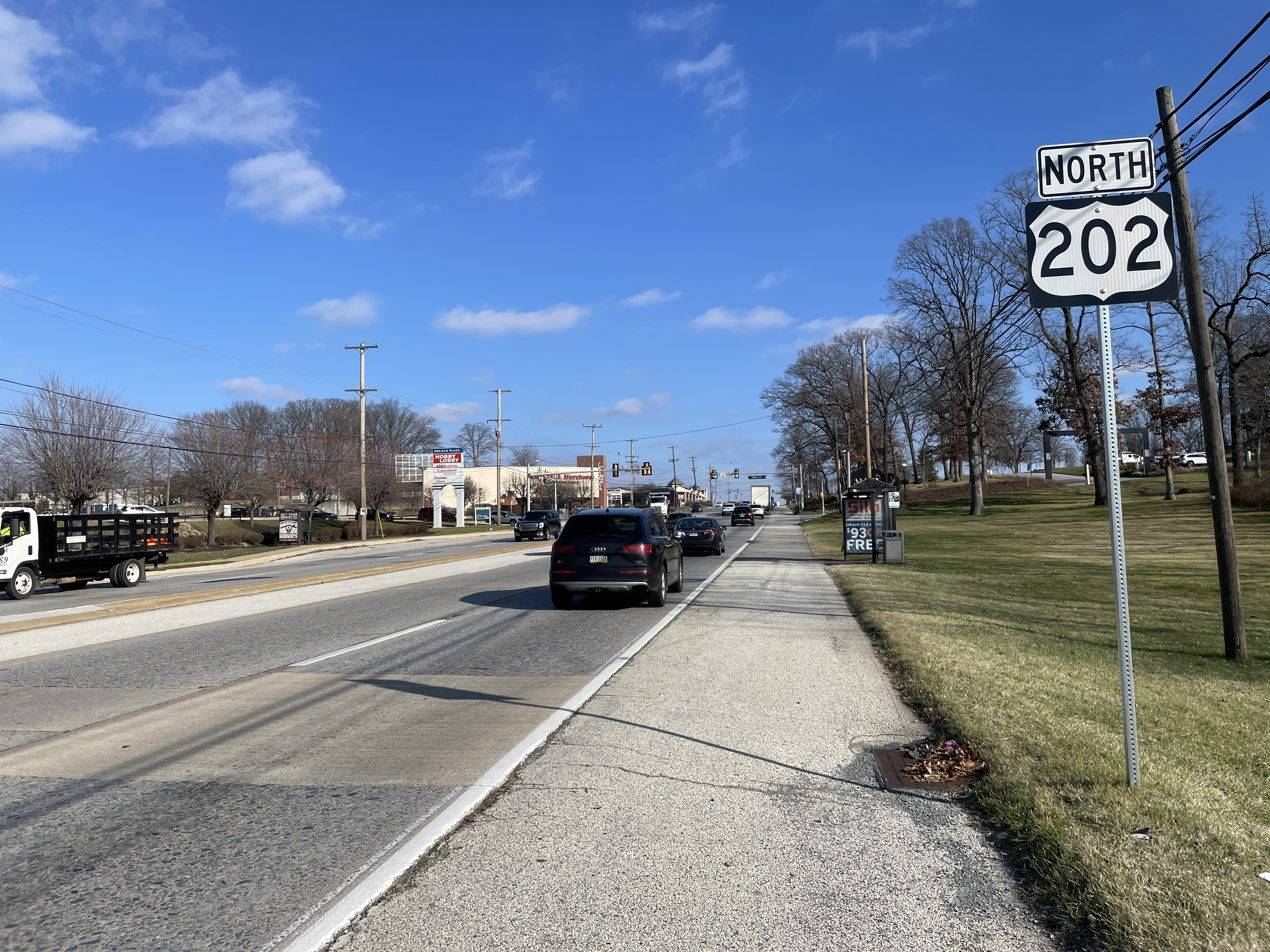
US 202 northbound in King of Prussia

US 202 splits into a one-way pair utilizing two-way roads, with the northbound direction turning east to follow four-lane divided East Dekalb Pike while southbound US 202 follows the four-lane divided Bridgeport Bypass; this intersection has a jughandle from southbound US 202 to northbound US 202. Northbound US 202 heads northeast into the borough of Bridgeport and becomes two-lane undivided Dekalb Street, passing over SEPTA's Norristown High Speed Line north of the DeKalb Street station before heading past residences and a few businesses. The northbound direction crosses an abandoned railroad line that to the west is part of the Chester Valley Trail, which heads north to follow the road, before it intersects PA 23 and widens to four lanes, coming to a bridge over Norfolk Southern's Harrisburg Line and running past more development to the Schuylkill River. Southbound US 202 heads south along the four-lane divided highway from the Schuylkill River into Upper Merion Township through wooded areas with nearby commercial development, passing over the Harrisburg Line before coming to a southbound exit to PA 23 and a northbound entrance from Ross Road, with this interchange utilizing a portion of the incomplete Schuylkill Parkway freeway stub. At the PA 23 interchange, the road crosses into Bridgeport. Past this, southbound US 202 crosses over the Chester Valley Trail and re-enters Upper Merion Township as it passes under Boro Line Road. Both directions of US 202 cross the Schuylkill River into the borough of Norristown. Northbound US 202 crosses the river on the Dekalb Veterans Memorial Bridge before it passes under SEPTA's Manayunk/Norristown Line and the Schuylkill River Trail east of SEPTA's Norristown Transportation Center serving the Manayunk/Norristown Line and the terminus of the Norristown High Speed Line; the Chester Valley Trail ends here. Southbound US 202 crosses under the Schuylkill River Trail before it heads onto the William F. Dannehower Memorial Bridge. The route passes over Washington Street and the Manayunk/Norristown Line before heading over the Schuylkill River. The route enters West Norriton Township and crosses over Norfolk Southern's Norristown Line and wooded Barbadoes Island before heading over more of the river and into Upper Merion Township. From here, northbound US 202 crosses Lafayette Street and becomes one-way with two lanes of traffic on Dekalb Street, passing businesses in the downtown area of Norristown, where it crosses Main Street and Airy Street. Southbound US 202 heads southwest into commercial areas in downtown Norristown along Markley Street, a three-lane road with a center-left turn lane, running to the east of the terminus of the Manayunk/Norristown Line at the Elm Street station at Elm Street. At this point, the road begins to parallel the Manayunk/Norristown Line, widening to a four-lane divided highway between Elm and Marshall streets. Southbound US 202 crosses under Airy Street and passes to the east of the Main Street station along the Manayunk/Norristown Line at Main Street. Past downtown Norristown, US 202 continues northeast through urban residential areas with some businesses, following Dekalb Street northbound, which is one-way with two lanes of traffic, and Markley Street southbound, which is three lanes wide with a center turn lane. At the northern border of Norristown, southbound US 202 rejoins northbound US 202 at Dekalb Street; southbound US 202 splits from Dekalb Street by following Johnson Highway, a three-lane road with a center left-turn lane, northwest between Dekalb Street and Markley Street along the border between Norristown to the southwest and East Norriton Township to the northeast.

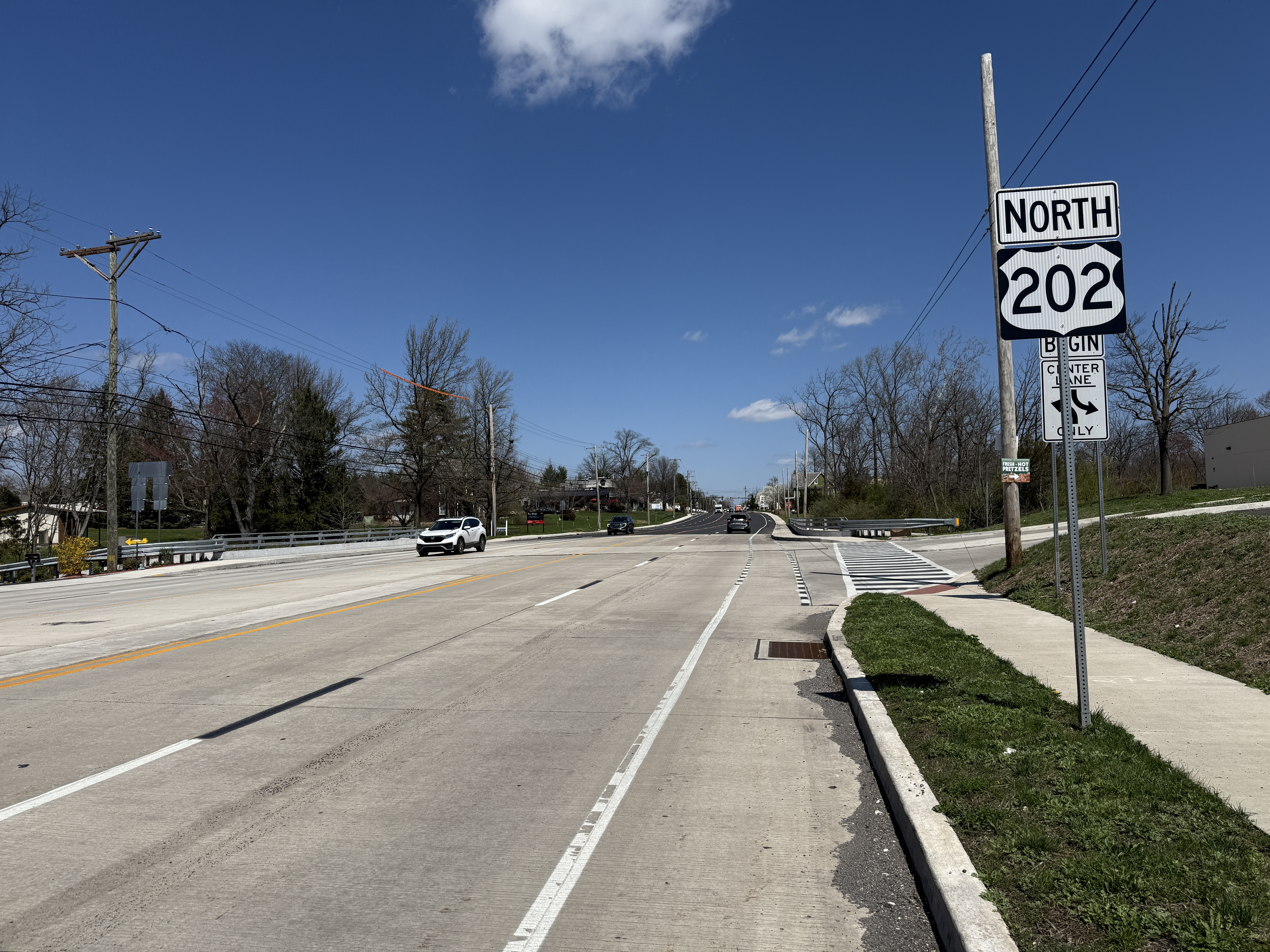
US 202 northbound past PA 73 in Center Square

From here, US 202 heads northeast into East Norriton Township along two-lane undivided Dekalb Pike, passing through suburban residential neighborhoods and running through the community of Grand View Heights. The road continues into business areas and passes to the southeast of Suburban Community Hospital, widening into a four-lane divided highway and coming to an intersection with Germantown Pike. The route becomes a three-lane road with a center left-turn lane before it narrows to two lanes and runs through wooded residential neighborhoods. US 202 reaches a junction with Township Line Road in the community of Washington Square, at which point it crosses into Whitpain Township. The road gains a center turn lane and passes businesses, intersecting Swede Road. The route continues past a mix of residential and commercial development as a five-lane road with a center left-turn lane and comes to a bridge over the Pennsylvania Turnpike Northeast Extension (I-476). US 202 reaches an intersection with PA 73 in the community of Center Square. From here, the road runs past businesses before heading near residential subdivisions. The route passes to the northwest of Montgomery County Community College before it reaches a junction with Morris Road in the community of Franklintown. US 202 becomes four lanes and passes residential development, crossing Township Line Road into Lower Gwynedd Township. The road runs through wooded areas with some homes, turning into a divided highway and heading across the Wissahickon Creek. The route passes under SEPTA's Lansdale/Doylestown Line before becoming undivided and gaining a center left-turn lane. US 202 curves north and crosses Sumneytown Pike in the community of Gwynedd. The road continues through wooded areas of development and turns northeast, running along the border between Upper Gwynedd Township to the northwest and Lower Gwynedd Township to the southeast as a five-lane road with a center left-turn lane.

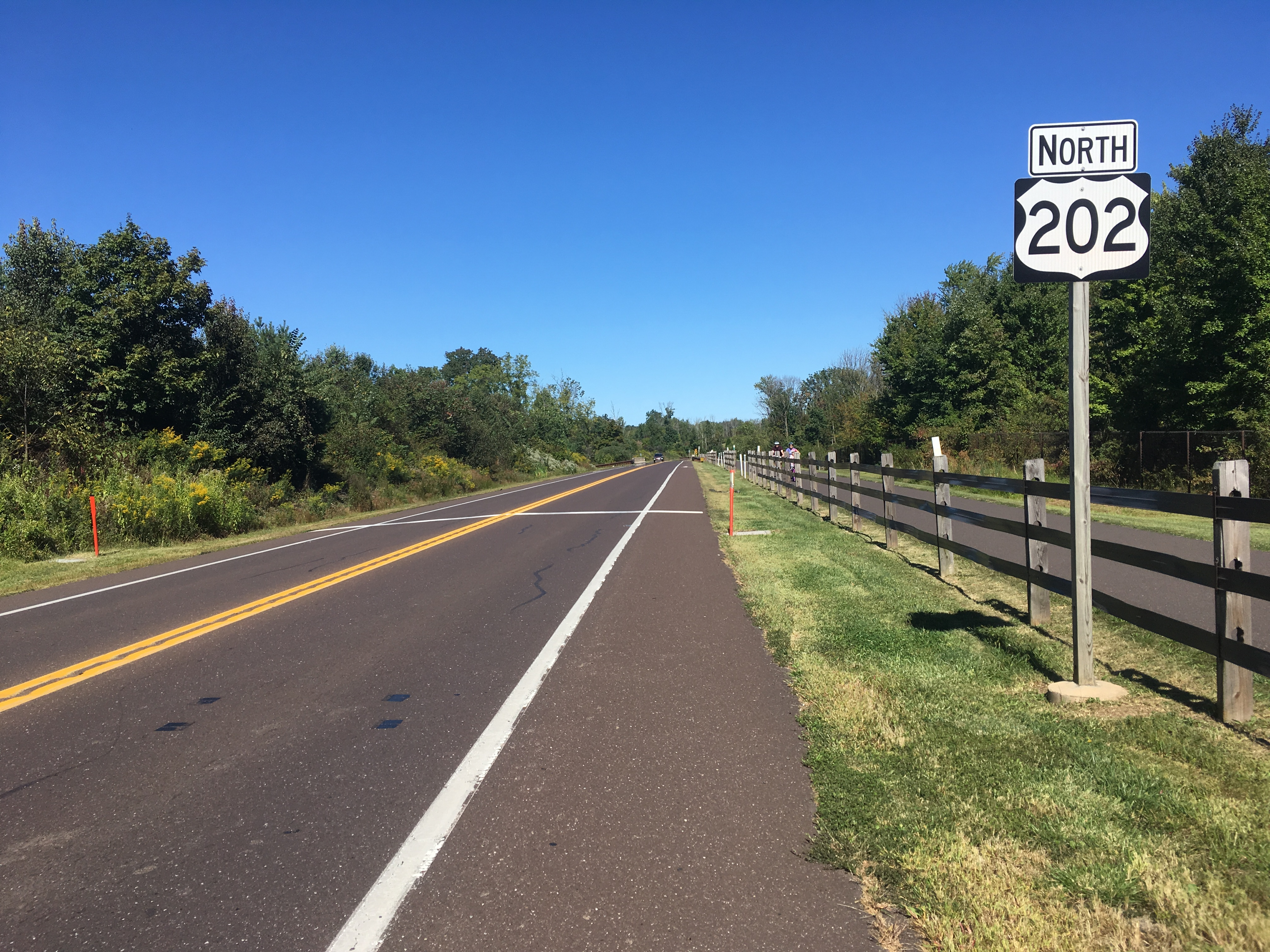
US 202 parkway northbound in Montgomery Township

US 202 becomes a four-lane divided highway and comes to an intersection with the southern terminus of US 202 Bus., where that route heads north on Dekalb Pike. Here, US 202 turns into a four-lane undivided expressway-grade parkway dedicated as the George A. Penglase Memorial Parkway. The US 202 parkway features landscaping and split-rail fences and is designated as a Pennsylvania Scenic Byway known as the U.S. Route 202 Parkway Scenic Byway; as such, billboards are banned. Soon after beginning, the parkway comes to an intersection with PA 63. Upon crossing PA 63, the US 202 parkway enters Montgomery Township in the North Penn Valley region and becomes paralleled by a multi-use trail called the US 202 Parkway Trail to the east of the road. The road winds north near residential and commercial development, intersecting Knapp Road. The route curves to the northeast and comes to an interchange with PA 309 (Bethlehem Pike) south of the community of Montgomeryville consisting of a ramp from northbound PA 309 to northbound US 202 and a two-way quadrant ramp on the northwest side of the interchange providing all other movements. At this point, the US 202 Parkway Trail crosses under the parkway at the bridge over PA 309, heading to the west side of the road and looping to pass over PA 309 on the bridge with the parkway. Following this, US 202 continues near development, heading across the trail again at the Costco Drive/Terrace Way intersection. The parkway reaches a junction with PA 463, at which point it narrows to two lanes. The road winds northeast through wooded areas with nearby residential neighborhoods and comes to an intersection with County Line Road, where it briefly widens to four lanes.

=== Bucks County ===
Upon crossing County Line Road, the US 202 parkway leaves the North Penn Valley region and enters Warrington Township in Bucks County, narrowing back to two lanes. The route and the US 202 Parkway Trail wind north through a mix of fields and woods. The road curves northeast and comes to an intersection with PA 152. The route heads northeast near residential neighborhoods and some woodland, passing under Pickertown Road before reaching a junction with Bristol Road. At this point, the trail heads to the west side of US 202 and the parkway continues into Doylestown Township, curving east and coming to the 1st Lt. Travis L. Manion Memorial Bridge over the Neshaminy Creek. The road heads through a mix of fields and woods and turns to the northeast, passing over Almshouse Road. The route curves back to the east and runs through more woodland, coming to an intersection with Lower State Road. Here, the US 202 Parkway Trail crosses to the south of the roadway. US 202 continues along the parkway past residential subdivisions and crosses under Wells Road before it curves northeast, heading northwest of Doylestown Central Park. The road passes over New Britain Road, at which point the parallel US 202 Parkway Trail ends.

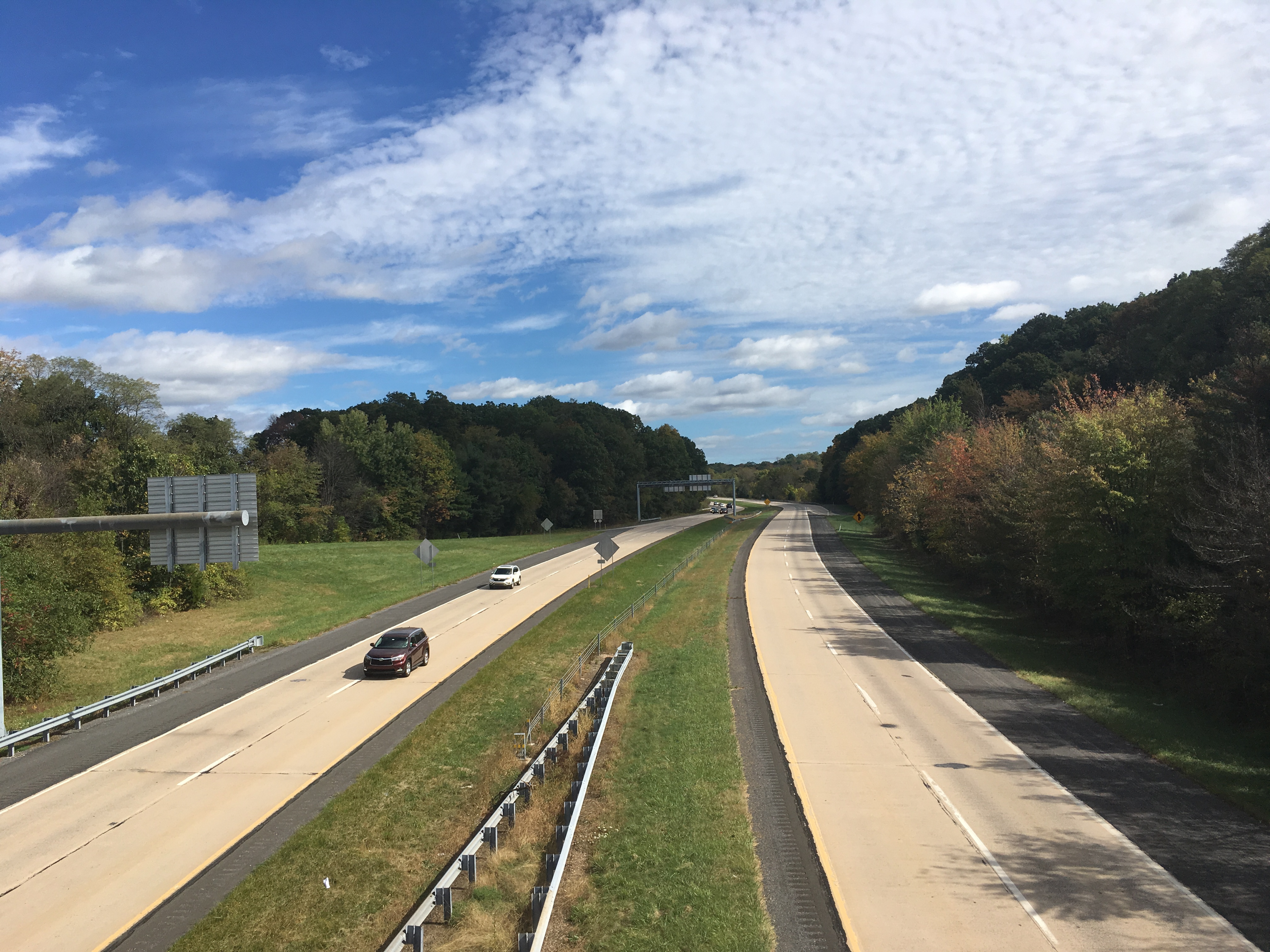
US 202 freeway northbound at Main Street in Doylestown

The parkway ends and US 202 transitions into a four-lane freeway, coming to a cloverleaf interchange with the PA 611 freeway. The US 202 freeway bypasses the borough of Doylestown to the south and runs through wooded areas, reaching a diamond interchange with South Main Street that serves the borough. Here, the roadway passes through a small section of the borough of Doylestown before heading back into Doylestown Township and running through woodland with nearby residential development. The freeway section of US 202 ends at an at-grade intersection with East State Street.

At this point, US 202 continues as four-lane divided Buckingham Pike between Doylestown to the north and Doylestown Township to the south, crossing PA 313 and entering Buckingham Township. Past this intersection, the road becomes two-lane undivided Doylestown Buckingham Pike and it heads east-northeast through a mix of wooded residential neighborhoods and some fields, bending to the east and crossing Watson Creek. The route continues through woodland with housing developments, curving to the northeast. US 202 heads east into the community of Buckingham, where it becomes a divided highway and comes to an intersection with PA 413. The road passes more development and becomes undivided, reaching a junction with PA 263. This junction has no access from northbound PA 263 to southbound US 202; access is provided via PA 413. At this point, US 202 turns northeast for a concurrency with PA 263 on two-lane undivided York Road. The two routes head through fields and woodland with some development, passing through the community of Holicong and crossing Lahaska Creek.

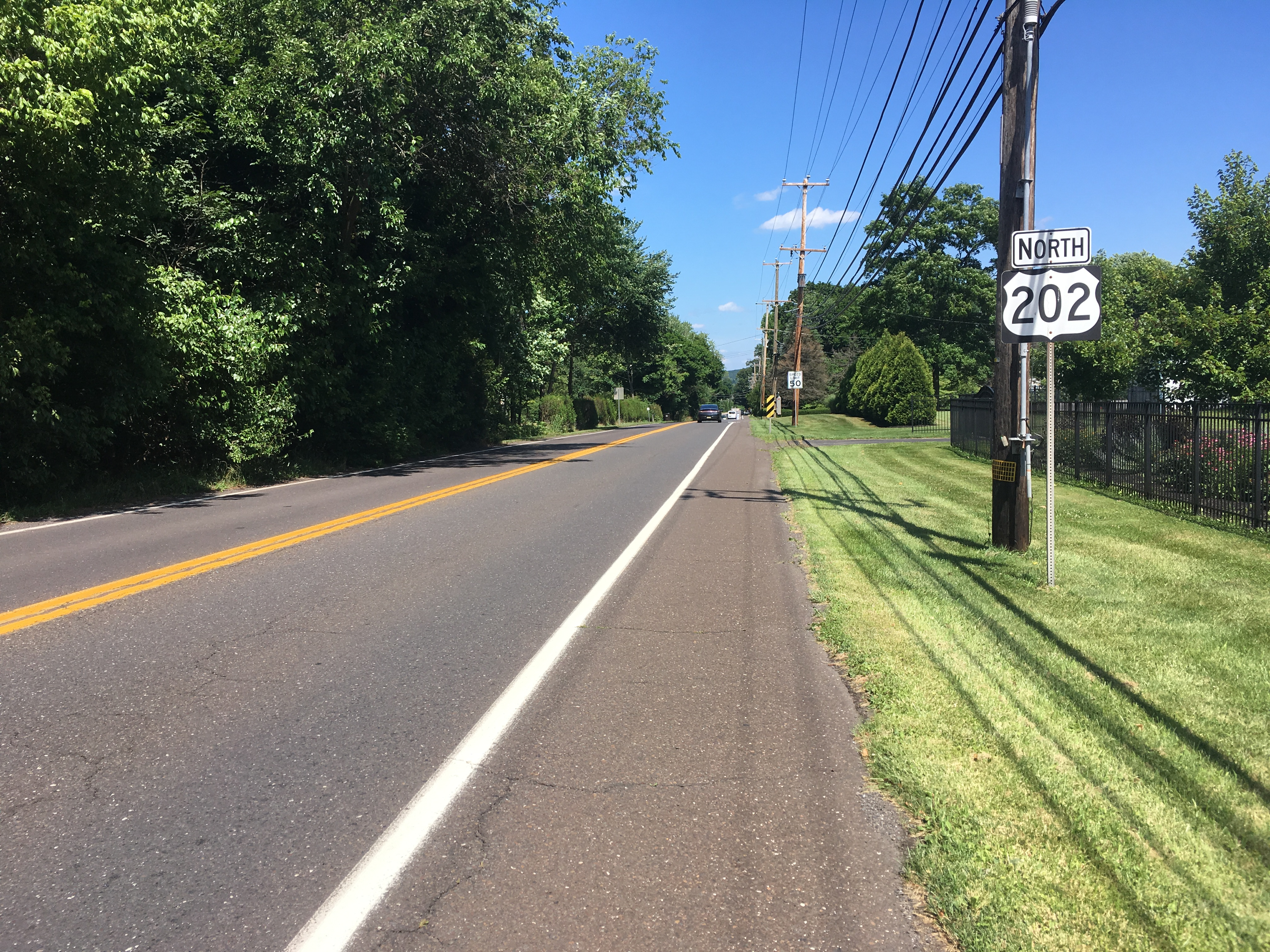
US 202 northbound in Buckingham Township

Upon reaching the unincorporated village of Lahaska, the two routes split, with US 202 heading east-northeast onto Lower York Road. The road passes between Peddler's Village to the north and the Penn's Purchase Factory Stores to the south, crossing Street Road into Solebury Township. The route runs past residential subdivisions before it heads east through a mix of fields and woods with some residential and commercial development. US 202 crosses Aquetong Road in the community of Aquetong and bends east-northeast through wooded areas. The road heads between residential areas to the north and businesses to the south, gaining a second southbound lane and then a median before coming to an intersection with the southern terminus of PA 179, which heads east (north) into the borough of New Hope. Here, the route turns northeast and becomes a two-lane undivided road, passing near more development as it heads through the northwest corner of New Hope. US 202 comes to a two-way ramp called US-202 Spur that heads east to provide access to PA 32, at which point US 202 curves north into Solebury Township and runs near development. The route turns east and becomes a four-lane freeway, reaching a southbound exit and northbound entrance with PA 32. US 202 has a southbound toll plaza and passes over the Delaware Canal and the Delaware River on the New Hope–Lambertville Toll Bridge, where it leaves Pennsylvania for New Jersey.

== History ==
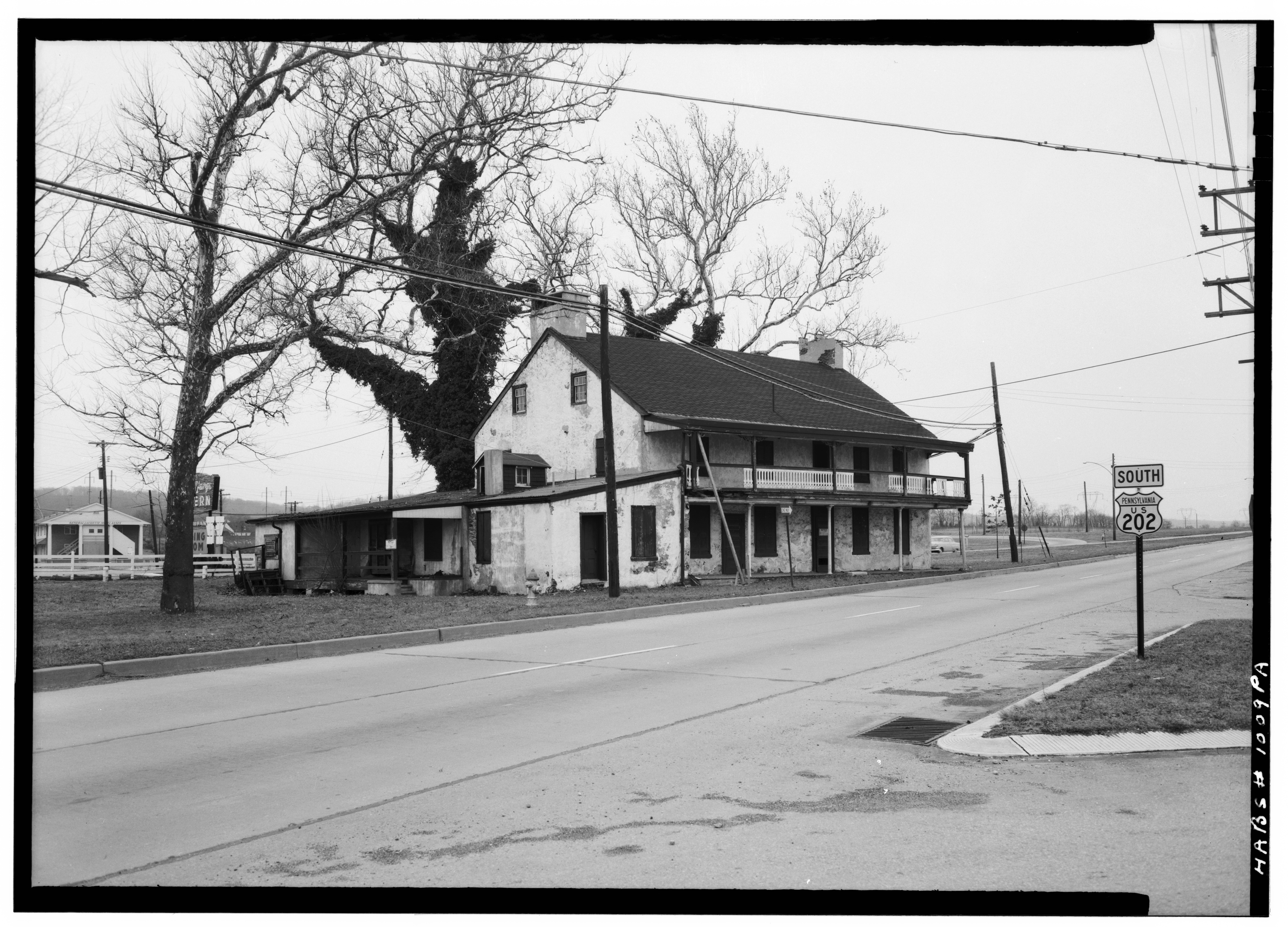
US 202 southbound past Gulph Road (then-PA 23) in King of Prussia in 1960, with the King of Prussia Inn in the median of the road. The inn was relocated in 2000.

The Dekalb Pike portion of US 202 was originally chartered in 1848 as the Norristown, Bridgeport, and King of Prussia Turnpike. Construction on the turnpike began in 1853 and shares for the turnpike company sold for $10 each. Shortly after 1885, the turnpike was turned over to public control and the tolls were removed.

Before the creation of the U.S. highway system, the route had been part of PA 29 between the Delaware state line and West Chester, and PA 52 between West Chester and the New Jersey state line. In 1926, the route was joined together under the designation of newly-created US 122, connecting US 22 at Whitehouse, New Jersey with US 13 in Wilmington, Delaware.

In 1934, US 122 became part of US 202.

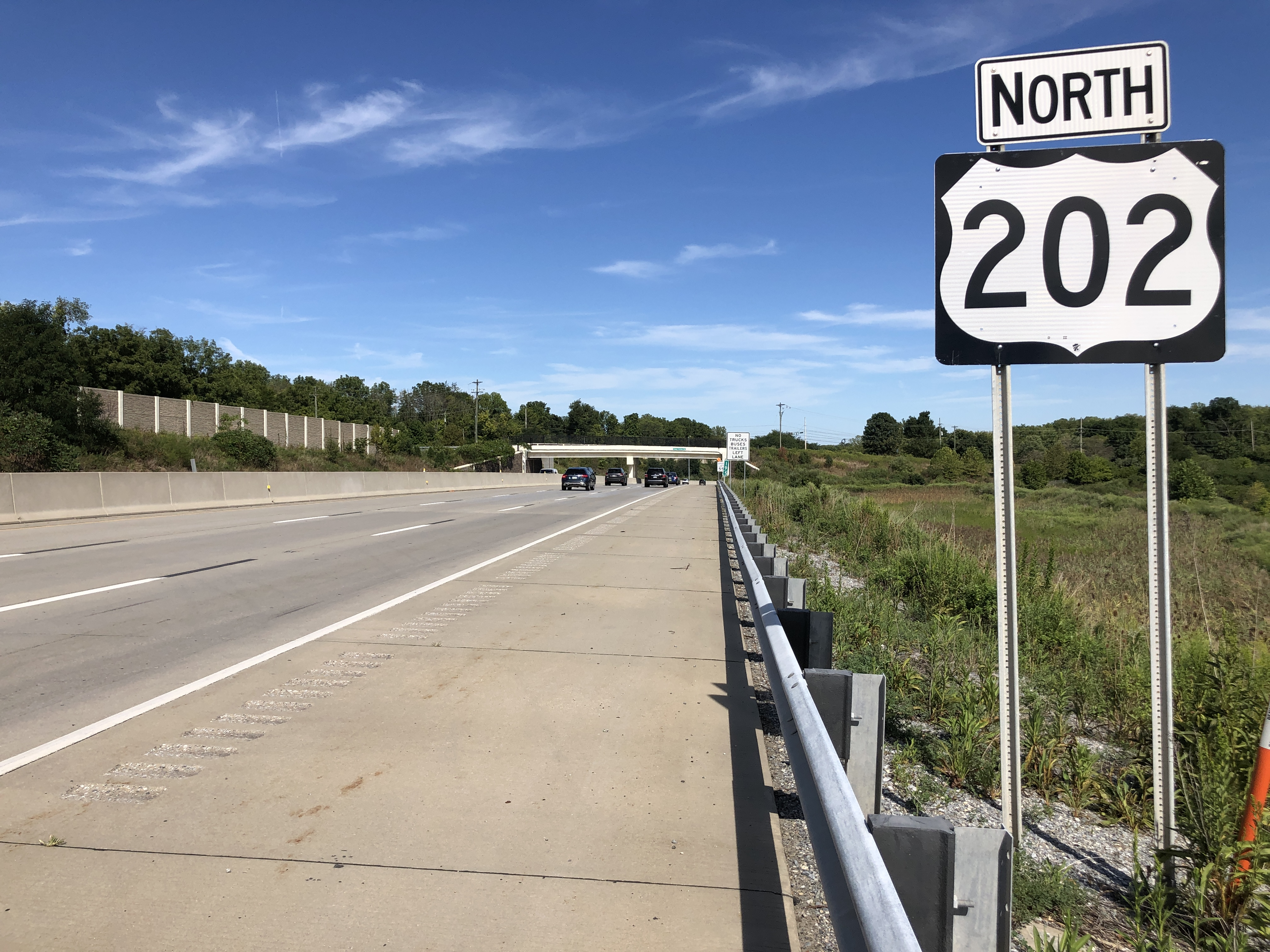
US 202 freeway northbound in Tredyffrin Township past the PA 29 interchange

In 1964, a four-lane freeway was proposed that would run parallel to the US 202 corridor in Pennsylvania. The "Piedmont Expressway" was to be 59 miles (95 km) long, and would cost approximately $146 million. Based on the location of the proposed expressway, it would also serve as an outer beltway around the Philadelphia area, similar to the Capital Beltway that encircles Washington, D.C.

Construction on the first portion of the proposed US 202 expressway from West Chester to King of Prussia began in 1965. At the time, US 202 ran on local roads from the West Chester borough to Paoli, then forming a brief concurrency with US 30 before turning north onto present-day PA 252 to King of Prussia. The new freeway alignment was known as the "Paoli Bypass" at the time of its construction, as it begins at the West Chester Bypass (US 322), bypasses Paoli to the north, and ends at the I-76 interchange in King of Prussia. The freeway opened in sections, with the portion between PA 252 and I-76 opening in 1967, the portions from US 322 to PA 100 and US 30 to PA 252 opening in 1970, and the final portion from PA 100 to US 30 opening in 1971. The new freeway, which was connected with the existing West Chester Bypass, completed a continuous, limited-access highway from just south of West Chester to King of Prussia. As a result, the US 202 designation was moved off of local roads in the area and onto the new continuous expressway.

Construction on the second portion of the expressway began in 1971 near Doylestown. The new route, completed in 1976, begins at an interchange with PA 611, bypasses Doylestown to the south and west, then terminates just before the intersection with PA 313. Both ends of the expressway were constructed with plans to continue the expressway further in both directions as part of the larger US 202 expressway plan. However, environmental concerns, local opposition, and continued development along the US 202 corridor in Bucks and Montgomery counties prevented further construction of the expressway. The segments of US 202 from West Chester to King of Prussia and south of Doylestown remain the only completed expressway sections of US 202 in Pennsylvania.

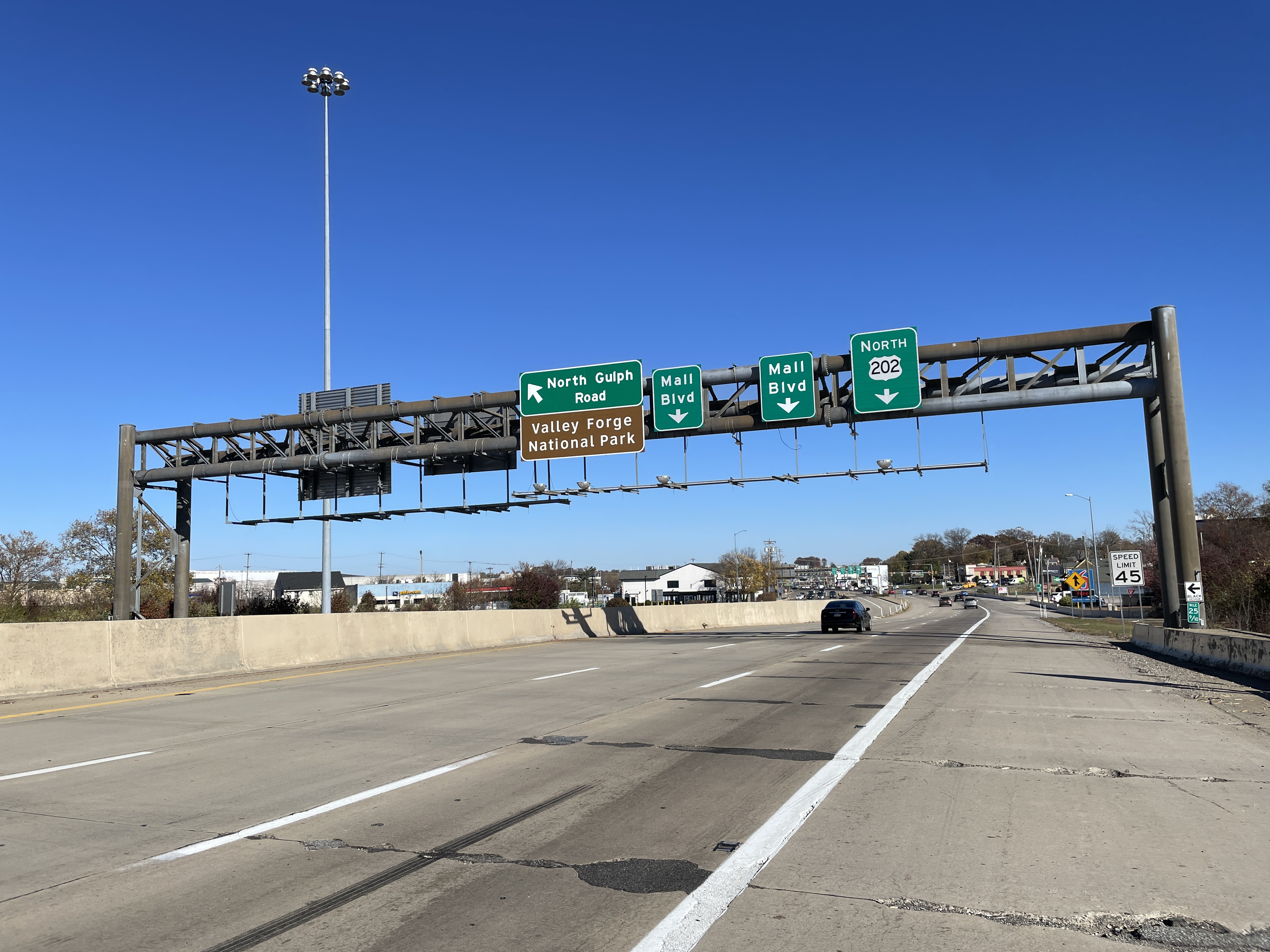
US 202 northbound approaching Gulph Road in King of Prussia

In 1999, a major reconstruction project began on the expressway section of US 202 near King of Prussia. The project included the widening of US 202 from four to six lanes from the North Valley Road underpass in Tredyffrin Township to the I-76 interchange in King of Prussia, along with the reconstruction of the King of Prussia interchange area where US 202, US 422, and I-76 meet. The reconstruction of the interchange area included the construction of multiple collector-distributor ramps that provided improved connections between US 202, US 422, and I-76. Also included in the project was the reconstruction of the Chesterbrook Boulevard and PA 252 interchanges, along with the relocation of the King of Prussia Inn, which had sat isolated for years in the median of US 202. The relocation of the inn allowed for improvements to be made to the intersection of US 202 and Gulph Road. In 2001, the project had to be delayed for several months due to the discovery of sinkholes in the area of the I-76 interchange, but was ultimately completed in 2003 with a cost of $290 million.

As the widening of US 202 during the reconstruction project took place, plans were made for further reconstruction of the expressway and widening of the highway to six lanes from the US 30 interchange in East Whiteland Township to the North Valley Road underpass. The $175 million project began in 2007 with the replacement of overpasses to accommodate for the future widening, with actual widening expected to begin in 2009. Additionally, a $130 million project was planned to widen the roadway from Johnson Highway on the border of Norristown and East Norriton Township to PA 309 in Montgomeryville in Montgomery County. However, PennDOT indefinitely suspended both projects, as money was needed to repair structurally deficient bridges. Work on widening and reconstruction between the Mill Road overpass and the North Valley Road underpass eventually began in April 2011, and was completed in September 2014. Construction on widening and reconstruction of the highway between the US 30 interchange and the Mill Road overpass started in April 2013 and was completed in August 2016, with a ribbon-cutting ceremony taking place on August 12, 2016. The project also included the reconstruction of the PA 401 interchange, and the construction of a northbound collector-distributor ramp at the PA 29 interchange. Further improvements to this section of the highway began in 2017 and were completed in 2019, with the rehabilitation of the Morstein Road overpass and the twin bridges over Amtrak's Keystone Corridor rail line taking place.

PennDOT realigned the intersection where US 202 meets State Street at the north end of the freeway in Doylestown into a T-intersection with a traffic signal, with the roadway gradually decreasing from four lanes to three (one lane each direction and a center turn lane), then to two, through Buckingham Township. All of this was competed by 2015.

Between February 2013 and September 2015, a construction project rebuilt the section of southbound US 202 along Markley Street between Johnson Highway and Elm Street in Norristown into a three-lane road with a center left-turn lane. The section of southbound US 202 along Johnson Highway was also restriped to include a center left-turn lane. In January 2020, construction began to rebuild and widen the section of southbound US 202 along Markley Street between Elm Street and the Dannehower Bridge in Norristown. Construction was planned to be completed in the later part of 2022.

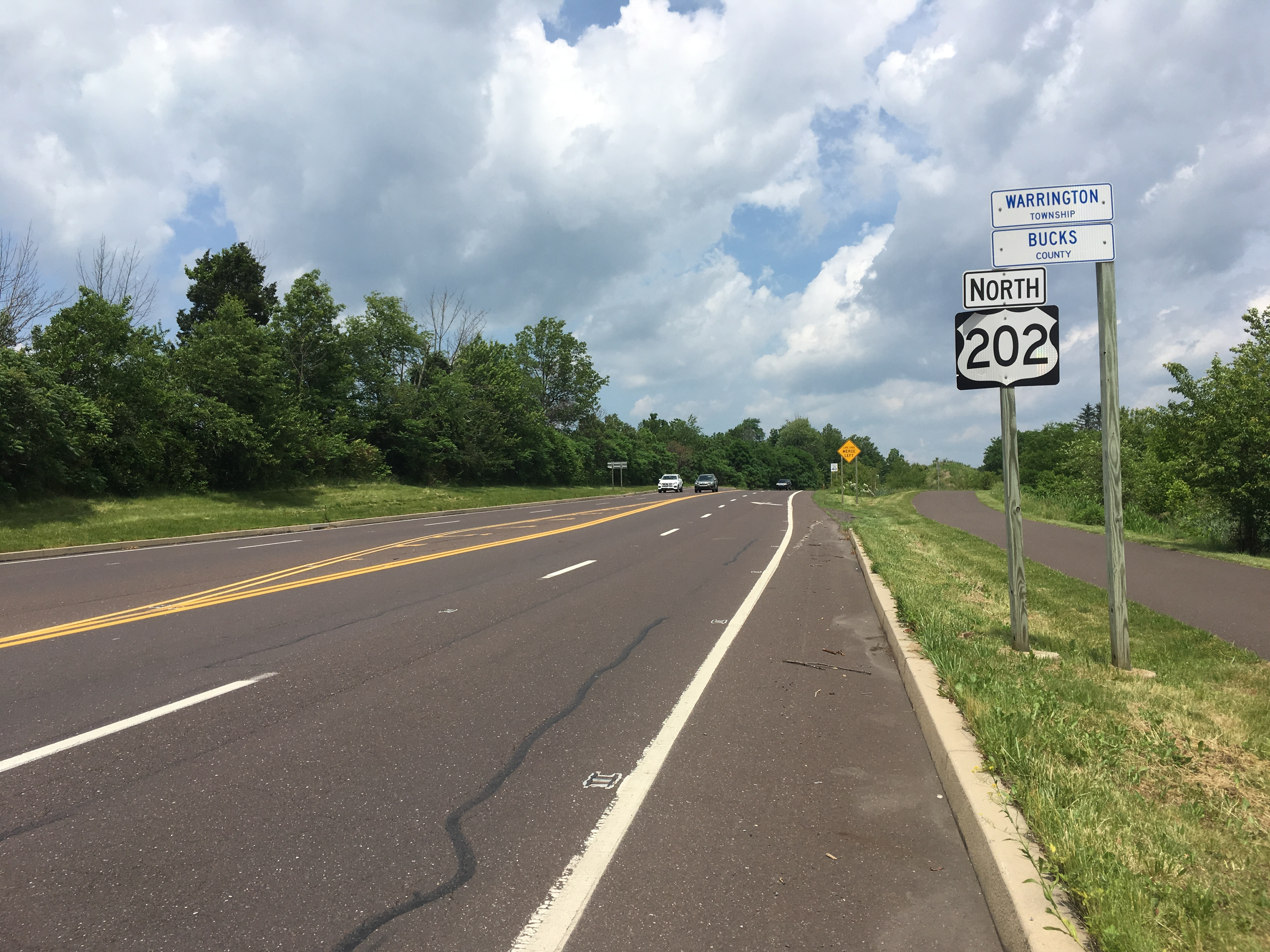
US 202 parkway northbound past County Line Road in Warrington Township

After decades of unsuccessful attempts to build the US 202 freeway in Montgomery and Bucks counties, a US 202 parkway was instead proposed in the area. The parkway was planned as an 8.5-mile (13.7 km) at-grade road that would run from Montgomeryville northeast to Doylestown. It was originally planned as a four-lane freeway, but in 2005 the plan was changed to a two- to four-lane parkway after funding for the road was cut. Construction began in November 2008 on the portion between PA 63 and PA 463, with construction on the portion from PA 463 to the interchange with PA 611 following in January 2010. The parkway was completed by the end of 2010 between PA 63 and PA 463, although this section remained closed to traffic until the remainder of the road was complete, with the exception of a small portion near PA 463. The parkway was completed in 2012, and opened to traffic at 2 p.m. on December 3, 2012, with Lieutenant Governor Jim Cawley cutting the ribbon to open the parkway. Construction of the parkway amounted to a total cost of $200 million. The parkway was built with four lanes from PA 63 to PA 463 and two lanes from PA 463 to PA 611, while including a 12-foot-wide (3.7 m) walking path running parallel to it. The US 202 parkway was designated as a Pennsylvania Scenic Byway, and as such, billboards are banned along its route. On July 7, 2011, an act of the Pennsylvania General Assembly was passed naming the US 202 parkway the George A. Penglase Memorial Parkway, in honor of a business leader from Bucks County who pushed for a bypass of US 202.

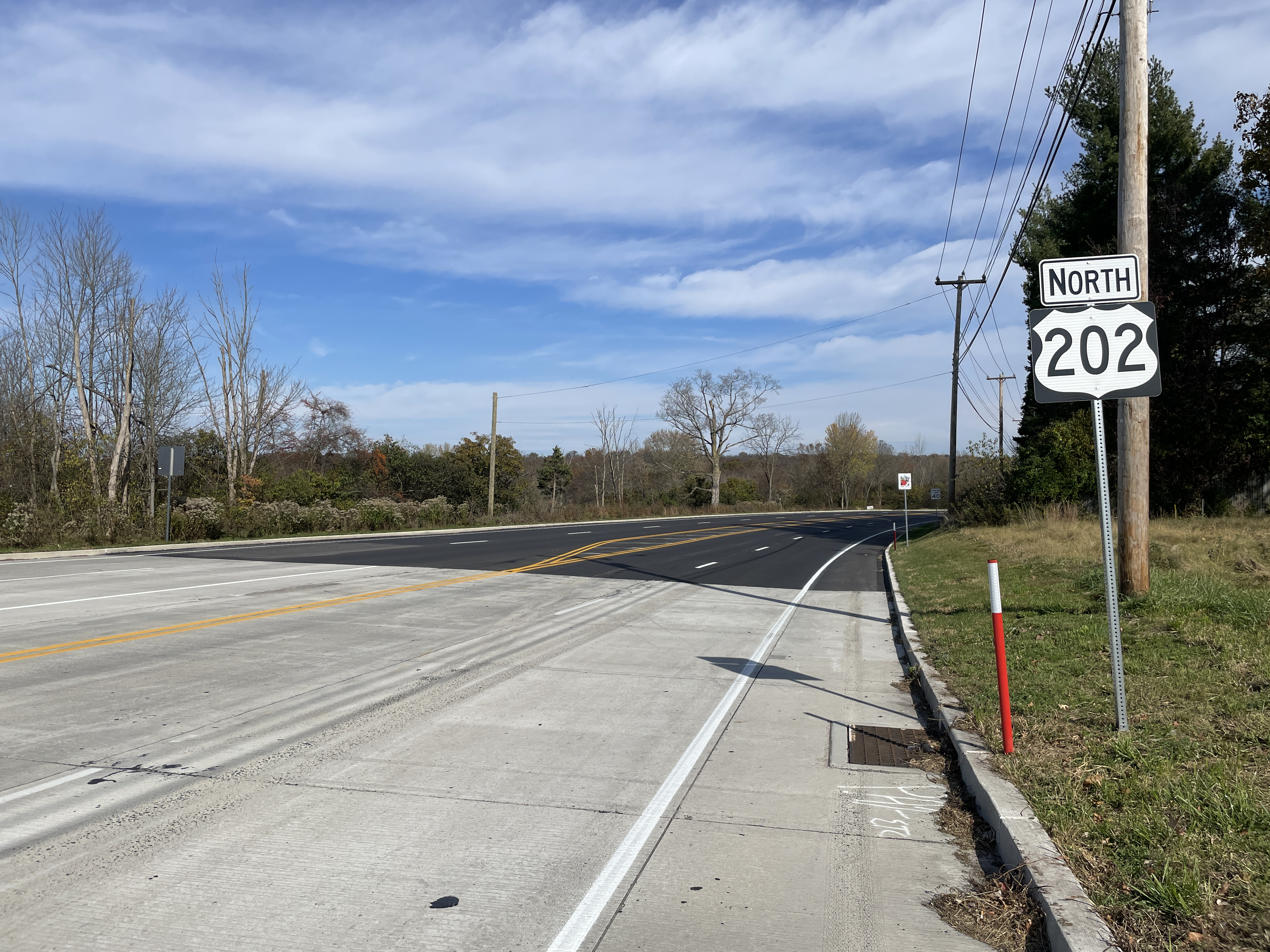
US 202 northbound in Lower Gwynedd Township

Prior to the opening of the parkway, US 202 followed Dekalb Pike, PA 309, Doylestown Road, Butler Avenue, State Street, and PA 611 between Montgomery Township and Doylestown. After US 202 was rerouted to the parkway, the former alignment was designated as SR 2202 in Montgomery County and SR 4202 in Bucks County. As a result of the removal of the US 202 designation from the former alignment, several businesses along the former route saw a decline in customers. In 2014, several businesses along the former US 202 alignment pushed for the state to designate the road as US 202 Bus. in order to help them regain customers. The American Association of State Highway and Transportation Officials (AASHTO) Special Committee on U.S. Route Numbering approved the US 202 Bus. designation on May 13, 2015.

On January 28, 2019, construction began on widening the section of US 202 from Township Line Road in East Norriton Township to Morris Road in Whitpain Township from two lanes to a five-lane road with a center left-turn lane. On February 3, 2020, construction began to widen US 202 between Morris Road in Whitpain Township and Swedesford Road in Lower Gwynedd Township to five lanes with a center left-turn lane. Construction on widening US 202 between Johnson Highway and Township Line Road in East Norriton Township began on June 23, 2021. Completion of the entire widening project of US 202 between Johnson Highway in East Norriton Township and Swedesford Road in Lower Gwynedd Township is expected in 2027.

== Major intersections ==
County	Location	mi	km	Destinations	Notes
Delaware	Bethel Township	0.000	0.000	US 202 south (Concord Pike) – Wilmington	Continuation into Delaware
Delaware	Concord Township	0.748	1.204	PA 491 east (Naamans Creek Road)	Western terminus of PA 491
Delaware	Chadds Ford–Concord township line	2.993	4.817	US 1 / US 322 east (Baltimore Pike) – Kennett Square, Concordville	Southern end of US 322 concurrency
Chester	Thornbury–Westtown township line	6.126	9.859	PA 926 (Street Road) – Pocopson, Cheyney	
Chester	West Goshen Township	7.741	12.458	Southern end of limited-access section	
Chester	West Goshen Township	7.741	12.458	US 322 Bus. west (High Street)	Eastern terminus of US 322 Bus.; access to West Chester University
Chester	West Goshen Township	8.215	13.221	Matlack Street	At-grade intersection
Chester	West Goshen Township	8.995	14.476	Westtown Road	
Chester	West Goshen Township	9.791	15.757	PA 3 (Gay Street) – Newtown Square	Gay Street not signed southbound
Chester	West Goshen Township	10.053	16.179	Paoli Pike	Former US 202
Chester	West Goshen Township	10.786	17.358	US 322 west – Downingtown	Northbound exit and southbound entrance; northern end of US 322 concurrency
Chester	West Goshen Township	11.561	18.606	PA 100 north to US 30 west – Exton	Northbound exit and southbound entrance; southern terminus of PA 100
Chester	West Goshen Township	12.560	20.213	Boot Road	Access to Brandywine Airport
Chester	East Whiteland Township	14.610	23.513	US 30 – Frazer, Downingtown	Downingtown not signed northbound; access to Immaculata University and Exton
Chester	East Whiteland Township	16.400	26.393	PA 401 – Frazer	
Chester	East Whiteland Township	18.344	29.522	To PA 29 – Malvern, Great Valley	Northbound access via Matthews Road, southbound access via Swedesford Road; access to Penn State Great Valley Campus and Immaculata University
Chester	Tredyffrin Township	21.267	34.226	To PA 252 – Paoli	Northbound exit and southbound entrance; access via Swedesford Road
Chester	Tredyffrin Township	21.964	35.348	Chesterbrook Boulevard	
Chester	Tredyffrin Township	22.223	35.764	PA 252 south – Paoli	Southbound exit and northbound entrance
Chester	Tredyffrin Township	23.357	37.589	Valley Forge Road / West Valley Road (NB) PA 252 north (Valley Forge Road) (SB)	Access to Devon
Chester	Tredyffrin Township	24.665	39.694	Devon Park Drive	Northbound exit and entrance
Chester	Tredyffrin Township	24.665	39.694	I-76 east – Philadelphia	Northbound exit only
Chester	Tredyffrin Township	25.071	40.348	US 422 west – Pottstown	Eastern terminus of US 422; access to Valley Forge National Historical Park
Montgomery	Upper Merion Township			Warner Road	Northbound exit and entrance; closed 2001
Montgomery	Upper Merion Township	25.778	41.486	Swedesford Road	Southbound exit and entrance
Montgomery	Upper Merion Township	25.778	41.486	I-76 to I-276 east / Penna Turnpike – New Jersey, Harrisburg, Philadelphia	No northbound exit to I-76 east; exits 328A-B on I-76
Montgomery	Upper Merion Township	26.026	41.885	Northern end of limited-access section	
Montgomery	Bridgeport	28.893	46.499	PA 23 – Bridgeport	Interchange; southbound exit only
Montgomery	Bridgeport	28.893	46.499	PA 23 (Fourth Street) – King of Prussia, Phoenixville, Conshohocken	Northbound only
Montgomery	Whitpain Township	34.125	54.919	PA 73 (Skippack Pike) – Boyertown, Whitemarsh	
Montgomery	Upper Gwynedd Township	38.394	61.789	US 202 Bus. north (Dekalb Pike)	Southern terminus of US 202 Bus.
Montgomery	Upper Gwynedd–Montgomery township line	38.526	62.002	PA 63 (Welsh Road) – Lansdale, Willow Grove	
Montgomery	Montgomery Township	39.541	63.635	PA 309 – Quakertown, Philadelphia	Interchange
Montgomery	Montgomery Township	40.195	64.688	PA 463 (Horsham Road) – Hatfield, Horsham	
Bucks	Warrington Township	42.865	68.985	PA 152 (Limekiln Pike) – Chalfont, Prospectville	
Bucks	Doylestown Township	46.823	75.354	Southern end of freeway section	
Bucks	Doylestown Township	46.823	75.354	PA 611 – Philadelphia, Easton	
Bucks	Doylestown Township–Doylestown line	47.481	76.413	Main Street – Business District	Access via Easton Road
Bucks	Doylestown Township	49.070	78.971	Northern end of freeway section	
Bucks	Doylestown Township	49.070	78.971	US 202 Bus. south (East State Street)	Northern terminus of US 202 Bus.
Bucks	Doylestown–Doylestown Township– Buckingham Township tripoint	49.119	79.049	PA 313 (Swamp Road) – Dublin, Furlong	
Bucks	Buckingham Township	51.651	83.124	PA 413 (Durham Road) – Mechanicsville, Newtown	
Bucks	Buckingham Township	51.846	83.438	PA 263 south – Philadelphia	No access from PA 263 north to US 202 south; southern end of PA 263 concurrency
Bucks	Buckingham Township	53.612	86.280	PA 263 north	Northern end of PA 263 concurrency
Bucks	Solebury Township	57.272	92.170	PA 179 north (West Bridge Street) – New Hope	Southern terminus of PA 179
Bucks	Solebury Township	58.007	93.353	To PA 32 – New Hope, Easton	Access via Lower York Road
Bucks	Solebury Township	58.007	93.353	Southern end of freeway section	
Bucks	Solebury Township	58.702	94.472	PA 32 – New Hope, Easton	Southbound exit and northbound entrance
Delaware River		59.002	94.955	New Hope–Lambertville Toll Bridge (southbound toll; E-ZPass or toll-by-plate)	
Delaware River		59.002	94.955	US 202 north – Flemington, Somerville	Continuation into New Jersey
1.000 mi = 1.609 km; 1.000 km = 0.621 mi: Concurrency terminus; Electronic toll collection; Incomplete access

== See also ==
- Special routes of U.S. Route 202

U.S. Route 202
Previous state: Delaware	Pennsylvania	Next state: New Jersey
