= Samuel Burris =

American Underground Railroad member

Samuel D. Burris
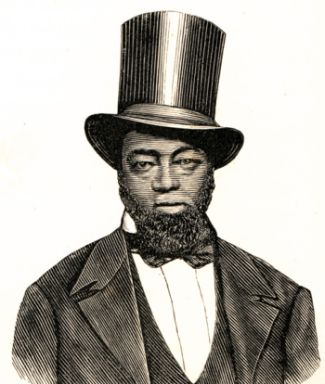
- Burris, c. 1850
- Born: October 14, 1813; Willow Grove, Delaware
- Died: December 3, 1863 (aged 50); San Francisco, California
- Occupations: Farmer, laborer, teacher
- Known for: Underground Railroad conductor
- Spouse: Catharine Burris
- Children: James, George, Mary, Sarah, Eliza, and Samuel
- Parent(s): George and Mary Burrows

Samuel D. Burris (October 14, 1813 – December 3, 1863) (Note: His month and day of birth are based upon a calculation, based upon his death on December 3, 1863, at the age of 50 years, 1 month and 19 days.) (Note: There is erroneous information about his dates of birth and death that do not synch up with public records or contemporary newspaper articles. He died at age 50 in 1863. There is also erroneous information that states that Burris was jailed for the attempted Maria Mathew's escape; he was acquitted. Content for this information is cited throughout the article.) was a member of the Underground Railroad. He had a family, who he moved to Philadelphia for safety and traveled into Maryland and Delaware to guide freedom seekers north along the Underground Railroad to Pennsylvania.

He was caught helping Marie Mathews escape slavery and was acquitted. Soon after, he helped a young woman and two young men named Isaac and Alexander. He was arrested for enticing slaves to runaway in 1847. After 14 months in jail, he was found guilty. He was sentenced to ten months in jail and a $500 file, after which he was put on the auction block to be sold into slavery. Abolitionists found that he was about to be sold and Isaac Flint posed as a slave buyer and bought Burris; he then set him free.

Burris still went into Delaware to guide freedom seekers, until a law was passed, naming him, that stated that continued assistance could result in 60 lashes of the whip in addition to being sold into slavery. He and his family moved to San Francisco, where he raised funds for education, food, and shelter for former slaves and looked for ways to help freed people become established with jobs and homes. He died in 1863.

== Personal life ==
Burris was born in Willow Grove, Kent County, Delaware, on October 14, 1813. His parents, George and Mary Burrows, were born free and lived in the Willow Grove area, where they owned property. Burris was "well-educated and eloquent". He and his wife Catharine had six children, James (born c. 1835), George (born c. 1837), Mary (born c. 1840), Sarah (born c. 1842), Eliza (born c. 1845), and Samuel (born c. 1846).

Burris worked as a laborer, farmer, and teacher throughout his life. At some point, Burris moved his family to Philadelphia for their safety. By 1847, he was a teacher in Wilmington, Delaware and he lived with his family in Philadelphia. In 1852, the family moved for their safety to San Francisco, where Burris and his wife Catharine lived with their sons James, George, and Samuel in 1860. Burris and James were cooks and George was a steward. Burris lived in California for the rest of his life.

== Background ==
In the early 19th century, Delaware was gradually reducing the rate of enslaved African Americans. Within the state of Delaware in the 19th century, there was division among its citizens about slavery. Methodists and Quakers in the state were generally strongly opposed to slavery. For example, Camden of Kent County had a significant Quaker and Methodist community and was a center for anti-slavery activity. Many Methodists, though, became pro-slavery after 1810. There were few slaveholders, but they held a lot of power. Free blacks were expected to accept racial prejudice, including the inability to vote.

In 1840, Delaware had the largest percentage of free black people in the United States. According to the 1840 federal census, there were 16,916 free blacks and 2,600 slaves in Delaware. In 1807, that prohibited a black person from returning to the state if they had been gone for two years. In 1825, it was illegal for blacks to be within half of a mile from a polling place on election day. In 1832, blacks could not bear arms and that year they lost the right to assemble. In 1849, African Americans were subject to a pass law. Throughout the century, the period of time that a black could leave the state and still be allowed to return was reduced from two years to six months, then six weeks, and in 1863, if a black person left the state for five days, they were prohibited from returning.

== Underground Railroad ==
Burris was an active member of the Pennsylvania Anti-Slavery Society in Philadelphia. He was an abolitionist who made trips to and from Delaware in the 1840s to free other African Americans from slavery. He worked on the Underground Railroad as a conductor, guiding Emeline and Samuel Hawkins and other escapees who passed through Camden and Dover. Being a conductor was like being an undercover soldier during a war. He is said to have helped hundreds of people in their northbound journey, taking them on secret paths to a network of safe houses.

He worked in conjunction with John Hunn, to help people who made their way through Maryland and Delaware to Pennsylvania. In the case of the Hawkins family, he and Hunn both worked to aid the family and Burris delivered a letter from Hunn to Thomas Garrett that stated that they were imprisoned and needed help. Doing so was a risk which could return Burris to slavery for seven years.

== Apprehended and sold as a slave ==
Burris helped Marie Mathews escape from the Dover Hundred and they were captured before Burris and Mathews could get on a steamboat in January 1847. Mathews was enslaved again. Burris was acquitted in that case.

He helped a young woman and two men named Isaac and Alexander. A grand jury was convened and he was arrested for helping them. He went to jail in Dover, and he remained in jail after his supporters raised his bail money and the authorities increased the bail to $5,000 (equivalent to $172,768 in 2025), which was unobtainable. He was jailed for 14 months. While there, he wrote letters to people about his plight, one of which was published in The Liberator. Burris said of laws in Delaware that allowed slave traffickers to conduct business freely, "They uphold and applaud those slave traffickers, and those inhuman and unmerciful leeches, in their soul-damning conduct, by making the colored people legal subjects for their bloody principles to feast on."

He also wrote a letter to his brother "You will recollect that the slave trader is only doing a lawful business, encouraged and protected by the laws of the state of Delaware, yet I cannot forbear taking all opportunities to express great abhorrence of servitude, and my passion for liberty upon any terms whatsoever."

Burris was charged with three cases of "enticing away 3 slaves". He was tried and convicted of two cases of assisting two runaways on November 2, 1847. He was sentenced to ten months in jail, a $500 file, and two seven-year sentences of slavery for a total of 14 years. It was believed that he would not come back to his family.

His friends, who were abolitionists and members of the Pennsylvania Anti-Slavery Society, realized he was about to be enslaved. The Governor of Delaware William Tharp was petitioned by Martin W. Bates, Judge James Booth Jr., and John J. Milligan to reverse the decision to enslave Burris. The Philadelphia Anti-Slavery Society came up with a plan involving Isaac Flint, a friend of Thomas Garrett and a Quaker from Philadelphia. He came to Dover with $500 (equivalent to $18,606 in 2025) on the day of the auction. As an out-of-towner, he was less likely to be recognized. Burris was put on the auction block in September 1848 on the steps of the Old State House. Flint claimed to be a slave buyer and he bought Burris, who was unaware of the plan. After the sale, Flint is recorded to have whispered to him, "not to fear, you have been purchased with abolitionist gold and I will spirit you away to Philadelphia." Burris then lived free.

The auction was described as follows:

When the hour arrived, the doomed man was placed on the auction-block. Two traders from Baltimore were known to be present; how many others the friends of Burris knew not. The usual opportunity was given to traders and speculators to thoroughly examine the property on the block, and most skillfully was Burris examined from the soles of his feet to the crown of his head; legs, arms and body, being handled as horse-jockeys treat horses. Flint watched the ways of the traders and followed for effect their example. The auctioneer began and soon had a bid of five hundred dollars. A Baltimore trader was now in the lead, when Flint, if we mistake not, bought off the trader for one hundred dollars. The bids were suddenly checked, and Burris was knocked down to Isaac S. Flint. But a few moments were allowed to pass ere Flint had the bill of sale for his property, and the joyful news was whispered in the ear of Burris that all was right; that he had been bought with abolition gold to save him from going south. Once more Burris found himself in Philadelphia with his wife and children and friends, a stronger opponent than ever of Slavery. Having thus escaped by the skin of his teeth, he never again ventured South.

— William Still, The Underground Rail Road

== Later years ==
He continued to assist runaway slaves. Some state that he continued to enter Delaware, while others, including William Still, state that he never returned. Citizens lobbied the state legislature for a law to further discourage Underground Railroad conductors. Burris was mentioned in a law that stipulated that people who tried to abet slaves had 24 hours to leave the state, or they would receive 60 lashes of a whip, which was likely a death sentence. This was in addition to being sold into slavery. In 1852, his brother and his family moved to San Francisco, California, and he followed three years later. He was active in the Zion African Methodist Episcopal Church of San Francisco. He was a fundraiser for education for former slaves. Burris helped freedmen get established with jobs and homes. He helped provide food and shelter for former slaves who were freed by the Union Army during the American Civil War. He also wrote and lectured.

== Death ==
Burris died in San Francisco on December 3, 1863, at the age of 50. His remains are now interred at Pioneer Mound at Cypress Lawn Memorial Park in Colma, California. Catharine died in San Francisco on September 11, 1869. She was 55 years of age.

== Legacy ==
- Notified by descendent Ocea Thomas of the presence of his remains, on April 8, 2017, Cypress Lawn held a dedication ceremony honoring Samuel D. Burris.
- At a ceremony at the Old State House in Dover, Burris was pardoned on November 2, 2015, of all crimes by Governor of Delaware Jack Markell. Some of his descendants, such as Ocea Thomas, attended the ceremony. Thomas read the letter that Burris wrote to his brother while in jail. The event was held in the building that Burris was tried in on the 168th anniversary of his conviction. Markel stated that the pardon "recognizes Mr. Burris' acts not as criminal acts but acts of freedom and bravery in the face of injustice."
- There is an interpretive program about Burris's role in the Underground Railroad and the trial at the Old State House in Dover, Delaware.
- A historic marker was placed in Willow Grove, his hometown. It is a stop on the Harriet Tubman Underground Railroad Byway, a self-guided auto tour that links slave “safe houses” and marks routes in Maryland and Delaware traveled by freedom seekers. It was erected in 2015 by the Delaware Public Archives and is located on Willow Grove Road.

Samuel D. Burris, a free African-American conductor on the Underground Railroad resided in the Willow Grove area during the 1840s. He helped enslaved people find their pathway to freedom in Philadelphia. Caught for aiding and abetting runaway slaves in 1847, Burris was tried and convicted in the Kent County Court of General Sessions. He was imprisoned in accordance with the law and sold into servitude. Purchased with abolitionist funds, he was taken to Philadelphia. The family moved to San Francisco shortly after California was admitted as a free state. He continued to help others gain their freedom by raising funds for the cause until his death in 1863.

- A plaque, naming Burris for his role in the Underground Railroad, is installed at Peter Spencer Plaza in Wilmington, Delaware. The plaque was subsequently moved to Tubman-Garrett Riverfront Park, Wilmington, DE.
- The story of his life has been illuminated through the research by the Delaware Division of Historical and Cultural Affairs. Madeline Dunn, one of the staff members initiated the research into Delaware's African American history and developed interpretive programs at the Division's museums. Beverly Laing has been conducting research on Burris since 1996.
