= Painters Crossing, Pennsylvania =

Unincorporated community in Pennsylvania, US

Coordinates: 39°52′37″N 75°33′05″W

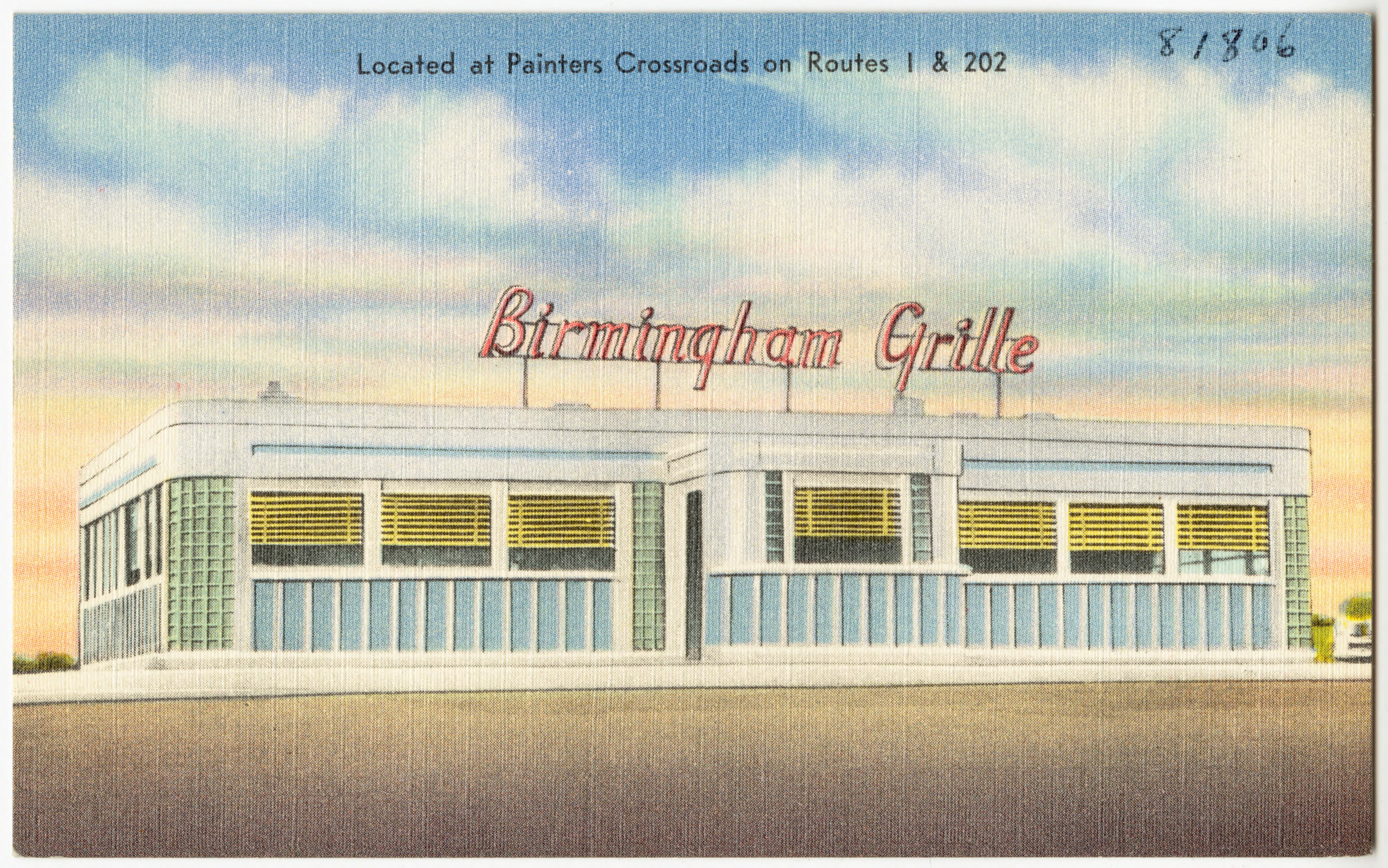
The former Birmingham Grille, located at the crossroads

Painters Crossing (or Painter's Crossroads) is a historic area of Chadds Ford Township, Delaware County, Pennsylvania, United States, near the intersection of U.S. Routes 1 and 202. The area is important in connection to the Revolutionary War battle at Brandywine.

According to US History.org,

Wayne posted a small brigade armed with four cannon, at Painter's Crossroads to cover the troops retreating toward Chester. They kept the main road to Chester open not only for Wayne's retreating men, but Nash's North Carolinians, and the rear guard of Sullivan's troops who were falling back from Dilworth.

The area of Painter's Crossing is named after Samuel Painter, a Quaker who moved to America in 1682 with William Penn and who purchased a large expanse of land in the area along the Brandywine in 1707 from John Piggott. His descendants lived on the land for many generations afterward. Their history is recorded in the book Descendants of Samuel Painter 1699–1903 by Orrin Chalfort Painter.

In the 1930s, the WPA Guide to Pennsylvania stated that it had a population of 37 and an altitude of 437 feet.

A condominium complex a few hundred feet from this intersection carries the official name "Painter's Crossing." This name is a slightly edited version of the more historical name, "Painter's Crossroads."
