= Darlington Corners, Pennsylvania =

Unincorporated community in Pennsylvania, US

- Unincorporated community
- Location within Pennsylvania Location within the United States
- Coordinates: 39°55′11″N 75°34′36″W
- Country: United States
- State: Pennsylvania
- County: Chester
- Township: Thornbury and Westtown
- Elevation: 374 ft (114 m)
- Time zone: UTC-5 (Eastern (EST))
  - Summer (DST): UTC-4 (EDT)
- ZIP code: 19382
- Area codes: 610 and 484
- GNIS feature ID: 1172957

Darlington Corners is an unincorporated community in Thornbury and Westtown townships in Chester County, Pennsylvania, United States. Darlington Corners is located at the intersection of U.S. Route 202/U.S. Route 322 and Pennsylvania Route 926, south of West Chester.
