= Tubman-Garrett Riverfront Park =

Urban park in Wilmington, Delaware, US

Coordinates: 39°44′11″N 75°33′09″W

Tubman-Garrett Riverfront Park is a public park on the Christina River waterfront in Wilmington, Delaware, United States. It is named in honor of Harriet Tubman and Wilmington Quaker abolitionist Thomas Garrett, who worked together as Underground Railroad operatives in the mid-19th century.

The park is located along Rosa Parks Drive opposite the Joseph R. Biden Jr. Railroad Station and forms part of Wilmington's redeveloped riverfront district. It serves as a venue for concerts, festivals and community events, and includes open lawns, walkways overlooking the river, historical markers and public art.

== History ==
The site was developed as part of Wilmington's riverfront revitalization in the late 1990s to provide public access to the Christina River. On March 10, 1999, it was officially proclaimed Tubman-Garrett Riverfront Park by the Riverfront Development Corporation of Delaware.

In 2012 the bronze sculpture Unwavering Courage in the Pursuit of Freedom by Mario Chiodo was installed in the park, depicting Tubman, Garrett and two freedom seekers and forming the northern terminus of the Harriet Tubman Underground Railroad Byway. The park is also included as a stop on regional Underground Railroad heritage trails.
