= Pennsylvania Route 926 =

State highway in Pennsylvania, US

Pennsylvania Route 926
- Street Road

Route information
- Maintained by PennDOT
- Length: 26.176 mi (42.126 km)

Major junctions
- West end: PA 10 in Upper Oxford Township
- PA 796 in Londonderry Township; PA 41 in Londonderry Township; PA 841 in West Marlborough Township; PA 82 in East Marlborough Township; PA 52 in Pennsbury Township; US 202 / US 322 in Darlington Corners; PA 352 in Westtown Township
- East end: PA 3 in Willistown Township

Location
- Country: United States
- State: Pennsylvania
- Counties: Chester, Delaware

Highway system
- Pennsylvania State Route System; Interstate; US; State; Scenic; Legislative
← PA 925	→ PA 927

Pennsylvania Route 926 (PA 926) is a 26.2-mile-long (42.2 km) state route located west of Philadelphia in Chester County, Pennsylvania. The western terminus of the route is at PA 10 in Upper Oxford Township. The eastern terminus is at PA 3 in the Philadelphia suburb of Willistown Township. The route is known as Street Road for its entire length. For 0.9 miles (1.4 km), PA 926 runs along the county line between Delaware and Chester counties. The route passes through a mix of suburban and rural areas along its extent. PA 926 is two lanes and undivided its entire length.

In colonial times, William Penn laid out a road in Marlborough Township called Marlborough Street. This road would be incorporated into a road surveyed in 1815 called Street Road that ran between Philadelphia and the Susquehanna River. PA 926 was first designated by 1928 on a different alignment running from U.S. Route 122 (US 122, now US 202/US 322) east to PA 129, a route that was designated along Street Road between US 122 and PA 352. By 1930, PA 926 was designated along Street Road between US 122 and PA 352, replacing PA 129. PA 926 was extended to its current length in 1937.

== Route description ==
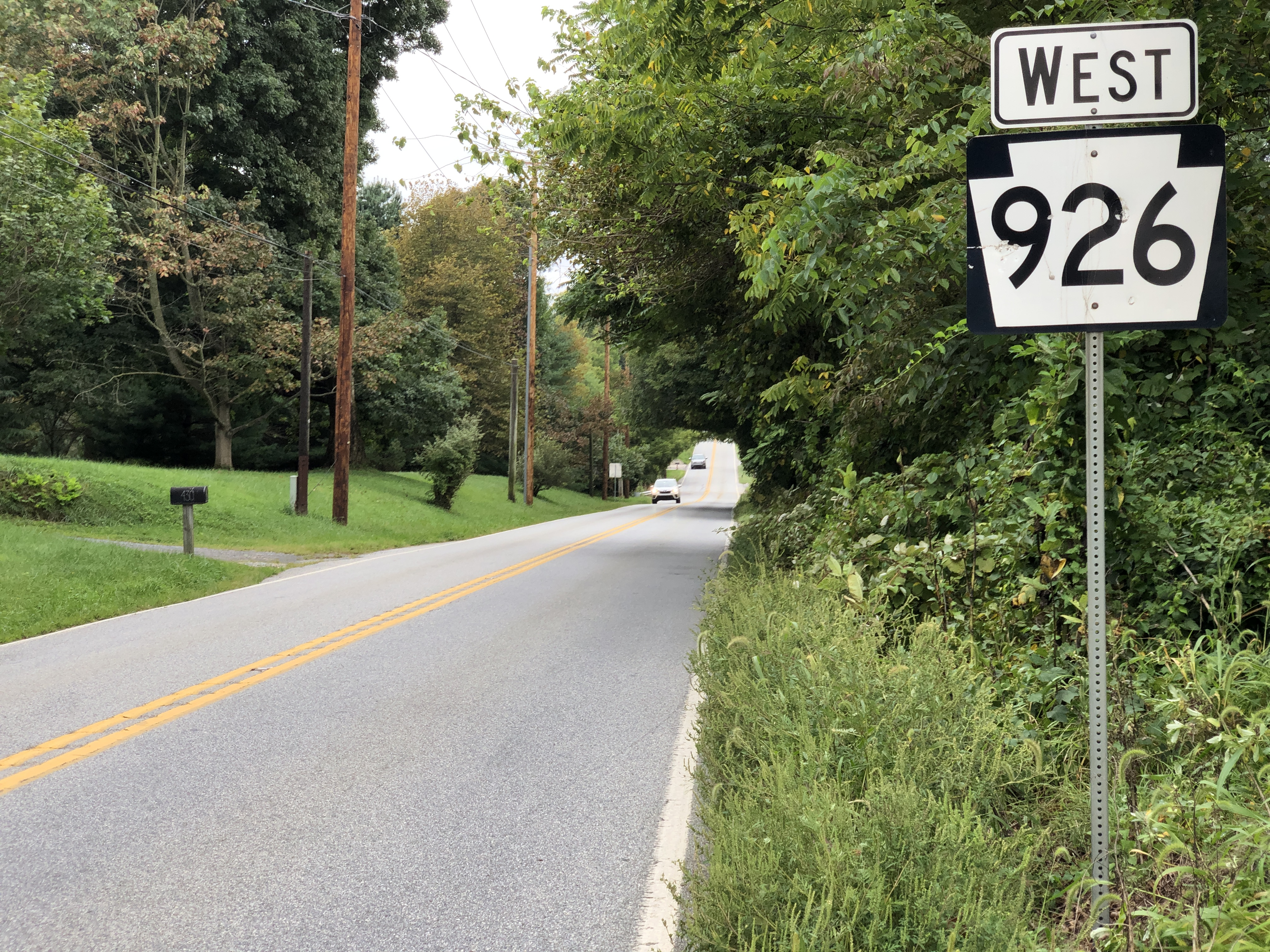
PA 926 westbound in West Marlborough Township

PA 926 begins at an intersection with PA 10 in Upper Oxford Township, Chester County, heading northeast on two-lane undivided Street Road. The road passes through farmland with some trees and homes, crossing the East Branch Big Elk Creek into Londonderry Township. The route continues east through rural areas and passes near a few residential developments before it intersects PA 796 in the community of Daleville. PA 926 runs past more farms and reaches a roundabout junction with PA 41. Past this intersection, the road curves southeast and parallels PA 41 for a short distance before turning to the east. The route becomes the border between West Marlborough Township to the north and London Grove Township to the south, passing to the north of a landfill before it continues through more agricultural areas with some woods and homes, intersecting PA 841. Farther east, PA 926 fully enters West Marlborough Township and crosses the East Branch White Clay Creek before it reaches the community of London Grove, where it briefly turns south at an intersection with Newark Road prior to turning east again. The road continues through rural areas and briefly becomes the border between West Marlborough Township to the north and East Marlborough Township to the south before fully entering East Marlborough Township, where it passes to the north of the University of Pennsylvania's New Bolton Center and crosses the West Branch Red Clay Creek. PA 926 runs to the south of a residential development before intersecting PA 82 in Willowdale.

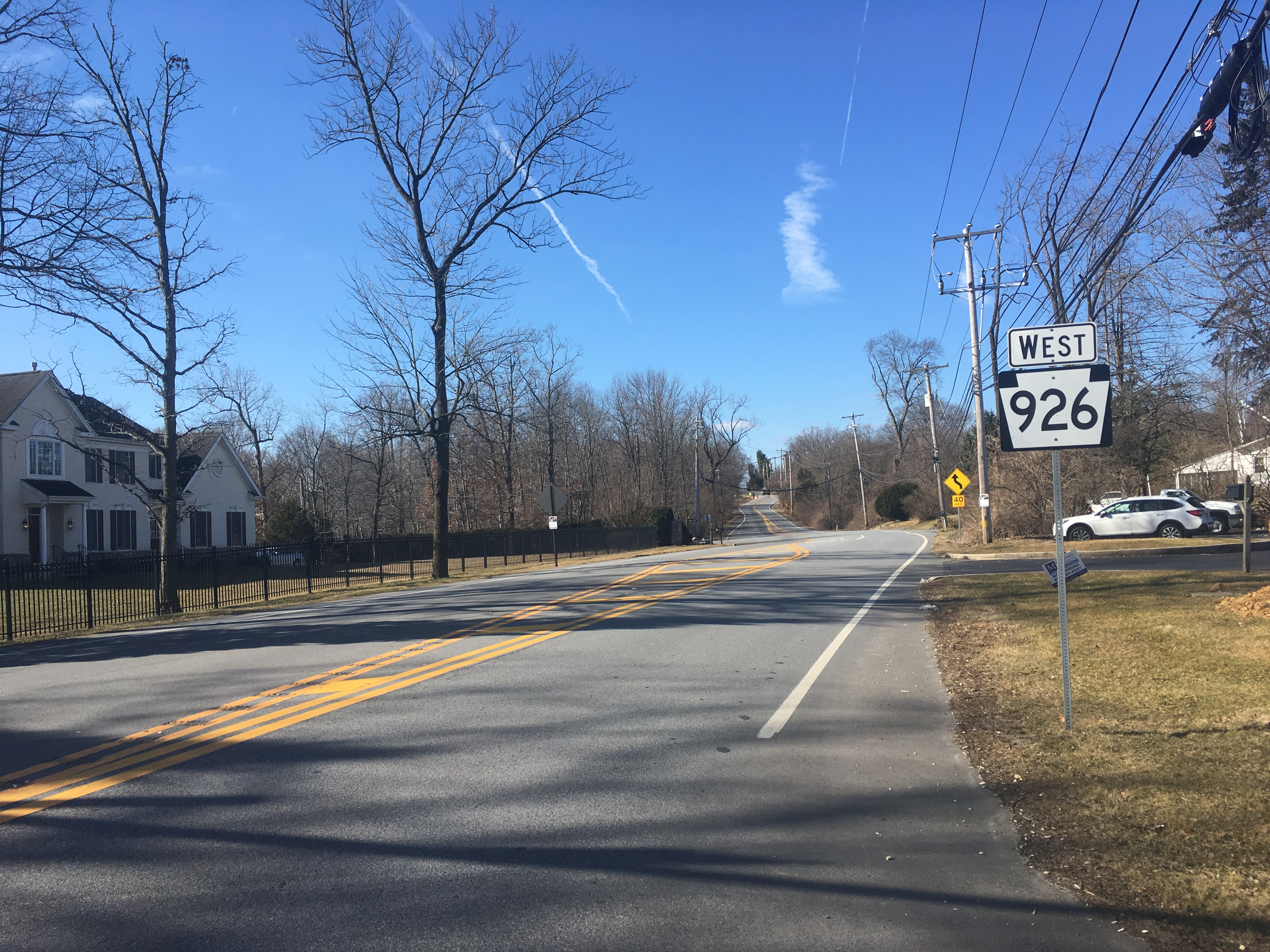
PA 926 westbound past the eastern terminus at PA 3 in Willistown Township

Following this intersection, the route runs east through a mix of farmland and woodland with some residential areas, heading across the East Branch Red Clay Creek. PA 926 crosses into Pennsbury Township and immediately intersects PA 52, at which point it heads more to the east-northeast. The road passes through wooded areas with some fields and residences, crossing into Pocopson Township. The route intersects Pocopson Road and crosses an East Penn Railroad line at-grade in the community of Pocopson. Past this, PA 926 crosses the Brandywine Creek into Birmingham Township. Just after crossing the Brandywine Creek, the route intersects Creek Road. The road continues northeast and runs through a mix of residential developments, fields, and woods. PA 926 becomes the border between Westtown Township to the northwest and Thornbury Township to the southeast as it passes through more suburban development with some farms. The route crosses US 202/US 322 in the community of Darlington Corners, where it passes near some commercial development.

The road heads through wooded areas of residential neighborhoods and reaches the community of Westtown, where it crosses the Chester Creek and passes over the West Chester Railroad before heading across the East Branch Chester Creek. PA 926 runs past residential areas with some farm fields as it passes to the north of the Cheyney University of Pennsylvania campus, with access to the university provided by Cheyney Road. The route becomes the border between Westtown Township, Chester County, to the northwest and Thornbury Township, Delaware County, to the southeast as it runs past more residential subdivisions and intersects PA 352. Past the PA 352 intersection, the road turns north to fully enter Westtown Township, Chester County, passing fields and woods. The route curves northeast again and crosses into Willistown Township, where it passes through wooded areas of homes. PA 926 reaches its eastern terminus at an intersection with PA 3, with Garrett Mill Road heading north on the other side of PA 3.

== History ==
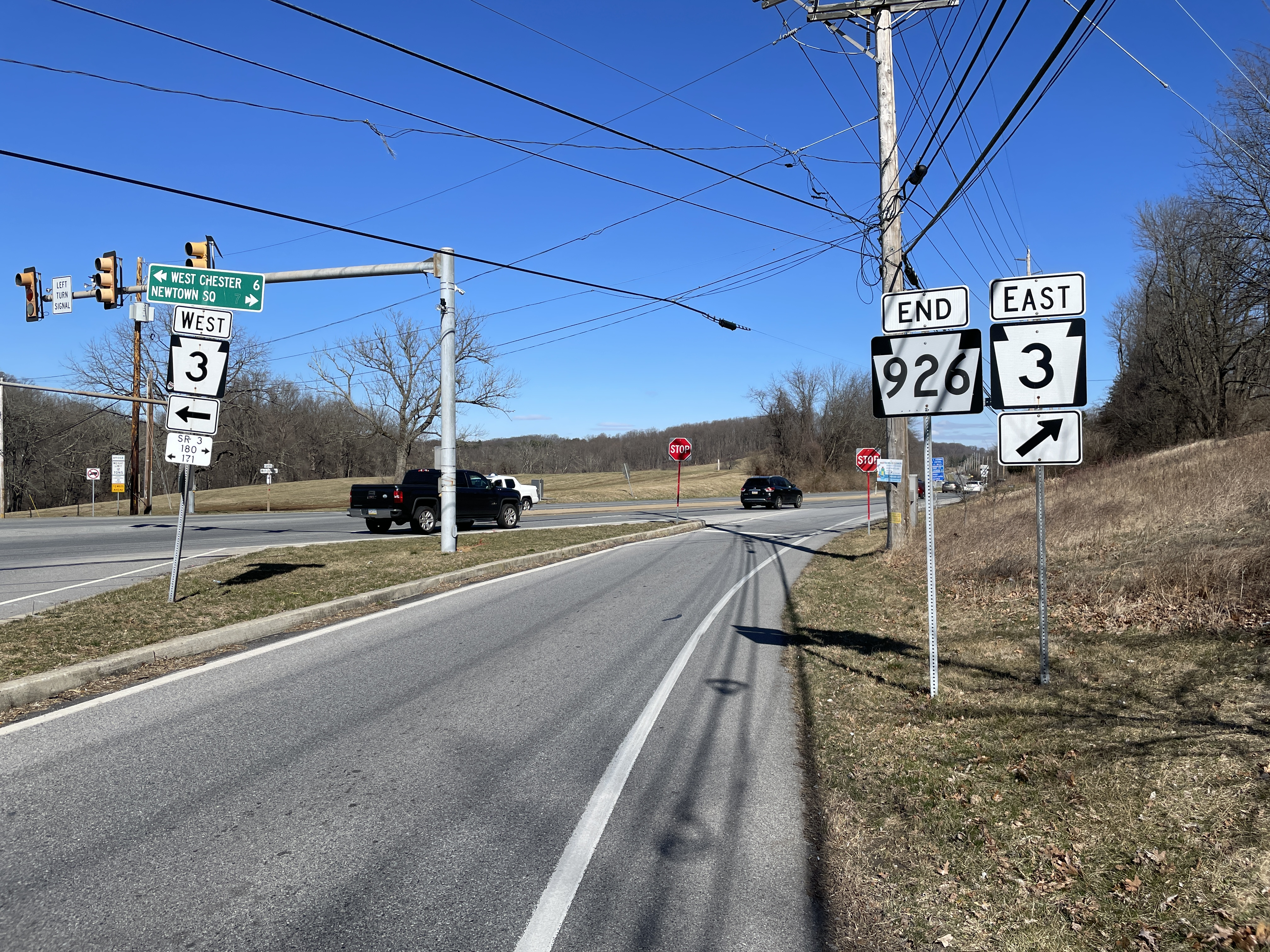
PA 926 eastern terminus at PA 3 in Willistown Township

Street Road dates back to colonial times, when a straight road in Marlborough Township was laid out by William Penn and was named Marlborough Street, running from Pennsbury Township to the Marlborough Friends Meetinghouse. In 1815, a road was surveyed between Market Street in Philadelphia and McCalls Ferry on the Susquehanna River to facilitate the westward expansion of settlers. This new road followed the alignment of Marlborough Street. This road became known as Street Road, named after Marlborough Street that it followed. When Pennsylvania first legislated its routes in 1911, Street Road was not given a route number. By 1928, Street Road existed as a paved road between London Grove and Red Lion and from US 122/PA 29 (now US 202/US 322) in Thornbury to PA 352 in Tanguy. PA 129 was designated along the portion of road between US 122/PA 29 and PA 352. PA 926 was first designated by 1928 to run from US 122/PA 29 east to PA 129 along unpaved Oakbourne Road and paved Concord Road and Westbourne Road. By 1930, PA 926 was realigned to follow Street Road between US 122 and PA 352, replacing the PA 129 designation on this stretch which was shifted to a road further south. In 1937, PA 926 was extended along Street Road to its current length between US 122 (now PA 10) near Russellville and PA 3 near Westtown. By 1940, the entire route was paved. PA 926 has remained along the same alignment since.

In October 2024, PennDOT completed a $6.3 million project to construct a roundabout at the intersection of PA 926 and PA 41 in Londonderry Township.

== Major intersections ==
County	Location	mi	km	Destinations	Notes
Chester	Upper Oxford Township	0.000	0.000	PA 10 (Limestone Road)	Western terminus
Chester	Londonderry Township	3.270	5.263	PA 796	
Chester	Londonderry Township	3.998	6.434	PA 41 – Cochranville, Avondale	
Chester	West Marlborough Township	6.084	9.791	PA 841 (North Chatham Road) – Springdell, Chatham	
Chester	East Marlborough Township	12.088	19.454	PA 82 (Unionville Road) – Unionville, Kennett Square	
Chester	Pennsbury Township	14.914	24.002	PA 52 – West Chester, Kennett Square	
Chester	Westtown–Thornbury township line	20.438	32.892	US 202 / US 322 (Wilmington Pike)	
Chester–Delaware county line	Westtown–Thornbury township line	24.555	39.517	PA 352 (South Chester Road / Middletown Road) – Goshenville, Lima	
Chester	Willistown Township	26.176	42.126	PA 3 (West Chester Pike) – West Chester, Newtown Square	Eastern terminus
1.000 mi = 1.609 km; 1.000 km = 0.621 mi

== PA 926 Alternate Truck ==
PA Route 926 Alternate Truck
- Location: Chester County, Pennsylvania
- Existed: 2013–2020

Pennsylvania Route 926 Alternate Truck was a truck route bypassing a weight-restricted bridge over Radley Run in Thornbury Township, on which trucks over 36 tons and combination loads over 40 tons are prohibited. Formed in 2013, it followed PA 52, US 1, and US 202/US 322. In 2020, the bridge was reconstructed, and the route was decommissioned.
