= Emeline and Samuel Hawkins =

Emeline and Samuel Hawkins (fl. 1840s) were a couple from Queen Anne's County, Maryland who had six children together and ran away from Emeline and her children's slaveholders in 1845, with the assistance of Samuel Burris, a conductor on the Underground Railroad. They made it through a winter snowstorm to John Hunn's farm, where they were captured and placed in the New Castle jail. Thomas Garrett interceded and as a result the Hawkins were freed and they settled in Byberry, Philadelphia, Pennsylvania. Two slaveholders, Charles Glanding and Elizabeth Turner, claimed to own Emeline and her six children. Glanding and Turner initiated lawsuits against Hunn and Garrett. Found guilty by a jury primarily made up of slaveholders, Hunn and Garrett were financially devastated by the fines levied against them.

== Early years ==
Sam was enslaved by John Hackett of Queen Anne's County, Maryland. In 1808, he was manumitted and established himself as a sharecropper.

== Marriage and children ==
Samuel entered into a marriage with Emeline, who was likely 15 or more years his junior. They had lived near one another and were allowed to develop a relationship. Since Emeline was enslaved, they could not legally marry. They lived in Sam's house. Emeline was enslaved to James Glanding of Queen's Anne County, which meant that when her sons Chester and Samuel were born, their children were also owned by Glanding, according to Partus sequitur ventrem.

When James died in 1839, Chester (16) and Samuel (14) were bequeathed to his son Charles Glanding. There was no mention of Emeline, who may have been manumitted or sold by James Glanding. A neighbor, Elizabeth Turner said that she owned Emeline and her youngest four children, Sally Ann, Washington, a child born around 1832 and another born around 1838. The family lived together in 1840, but they were later separated to different farms in the Beaver Dam area of the county, but they were able to visit one another. Sam tried to purchase his wife and children's freedom for years and into 1845.

Turner was forced to sell her due to financial reversals. Concerned that his family would be sold and further separated, Samuel arranged with Samuel Burris to help the Hawkins family escape. They planned to travel through Delaware and meet up with Thomas Garrett.

== Flight ==
Samuel Burris led Emeline, Samuel, and their six children out of Queen Anne's County in November 1845. They went to Camden, Delaware where they met four black men who were also traveling on the Underground Railroad. Ezekiel Jenkins, a Quaker, gave the group a letter to give to the next conductor. They traveled through a snowstorm, with Sam driving a wagon with Emeline and their children. The men walked through the snow.

In December 1845, they arrived at John Hunn's farm, a station on the Underground Railroad, in Middletown, Delaware. Hunn received the group of thirteen, noticing that they all had suffered from the journey. He said of the time, "One man, in trying to pull his boots off, found they were frozen to his feet...Most of them were badly frost-bitten from walking through the six inches of snow." The letter from Jenkins, Hunn's cousin, was given to Hunn and the group were fed and provided shelter.

Hunn's neighbor saw the arrival of the Hawkins and four men and reported the siting to Richard C. Hayes, the Constable of Middleton. Hays went to Hunn's house with a search party of five men from Queen Anne's County who were looking for the Hawkins family. They were captured by slave catchers and taken to the New Castle County Jail, but they did not have the proper papers to hold them. (Note: The four men were allowed to continue their journey to Wilmington with Burris.) Having heard of the plight of the Hawkins family, Thomas Garrett filed a writ of habeas corpus before the Chief Justice of the state of Delaware, Judge Booth. Booth reviewed a copy of James Glanding's will and found that there was no evidence of slave status. He ordered the family's release. Garrett had the family transported by coach to Pennsylvania.

== Trials ==
In May 1846, Charles Glanding (enslaver of Chester and Samuel) and Elizabeth Turner (enslaver of Emeline and her four younger children) brought John Hunn and Thomas Garret to trial under the Fugitive Slave Act of 1793, which made it a federal crime to assist runaway slaves. Six trials were held in the U.S. Circuit Court in Delaware, presided over by Roger B. Taney, the Chief Justice of the Supreme Court. Glanding and Turner filed for damages due to trespass and debt. The jury ruled in favor of the Glanding and Turner. Thomas Garrett was fined a total of $5,400 (equivalent to $193,500 in 2025) from the six suits.

The members of the jury were primarily slaveholder of Sussex County. Judge Taney set a precedent that the $500 fine under the Fugitive Slave Act applied to each person who was assisted, rather than a blanket $500 fine. As a result, Hunn lost his farm and Garrett lost his home and business. Hunn pled guilty and did not go to trial. He was fined $2,500.

== Byberry ==
The family settled in Byberry, Philadelphia near the farm of a member of the Pennsylvania Anti-Slavery Society, Robert Purvis. They changed their surname to Hackett. Chester and Samuel were apprenticed to people in the area. Sam died two or three years after settling in Pennsylvania. Generations of Hackett family members have lived in the area.
