= Pocopson, Pennsylvania =

Unincorporated community in Pennsylvania, US

- Unincorporated community
- Location within Pennsylvania
- Coordinates: 39°54′1″N 75°37′33″W
- Country: United States
- State: Pennsylvania
- County: Chester
- Township: Pocopson
- Elevation: 180 ft (55 m)
- Time zone: UTC-5 (Eastern (EST))
  - Summer (DST): UTC-4 (EDT)
- ZIP code: 19366
- Area codes: 610 and 484
- GNIS feature ID: 1204428

Pocopson is an unincorporated community in Pocopson Township in Chester County, Pennsylvania, United States. Pocopson is located at the intersection of Pennsylvania Route 926 and Pocopson Road.

== Former train station ==
Pocopson was once served by a train station that opened in 1890.
