= London Grove, Pennsylvania =

Unincorporated community in Pennsylvania, US

- Unincorporated community
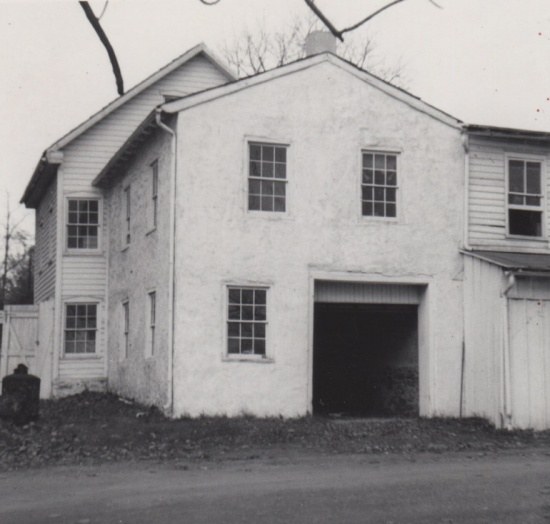
- London Grove blacksmith shop
- Interactive map of London Grove, Pennsylvania
- Coordinates: 39°52′05″N 75°46′22″W
- Country: United States
- State: Pennsylvania
- County: Chester
- Township: West Marlborough
- Elevation: 443 ft (135 m)
- Time zone: UTC-5 (Eastern (EST))
  - Summer (DST): UTC-4 (EDT)
- Area codes: 610 and 484
- GNIS feature ID: 1179835

London Grove is an unincorporated community in West Marlborough Township in Chester County, Pennsylvania, United States. London Grove is located at the intersection of Pennsylvania Route 926 and Newark Road, north of Avondale. There was a blacksmith shop (at the middle of the intersection) and a general store, now the parking lot for an apartment building.
