= Thomas Garrett =

American abolitionist

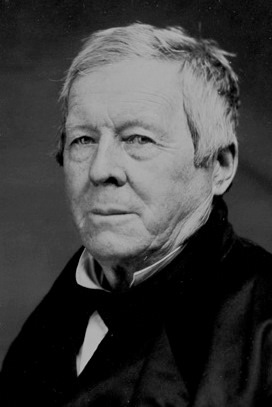
- Garrett around 1850
- Born: August 21, 1789; Upper Darby Township, Pennsylvania, U.S.
- Died: January 25, 1871 (aged 81); Wilmington, Delaware, U.S.
- Occupations: Abolitionist, Underground Railroad station master
- Years active: 1813–1865

Thomas Garrett (August 21, 1789 – January 25, 1871) was an American abolitionist and assisted in the Underground Railroad movement before the American Civil War. He helped more than 2,500 African Americans escape slavery.

For his efforts, he was threatened, harassed, and assaulted. A $10,000 (equivalent to $387,000 in 2025) bounty was established for his capture. He was arrested and convicted for helping Emeline and Samuel Hawkins escape slavery.

== Personal life ==
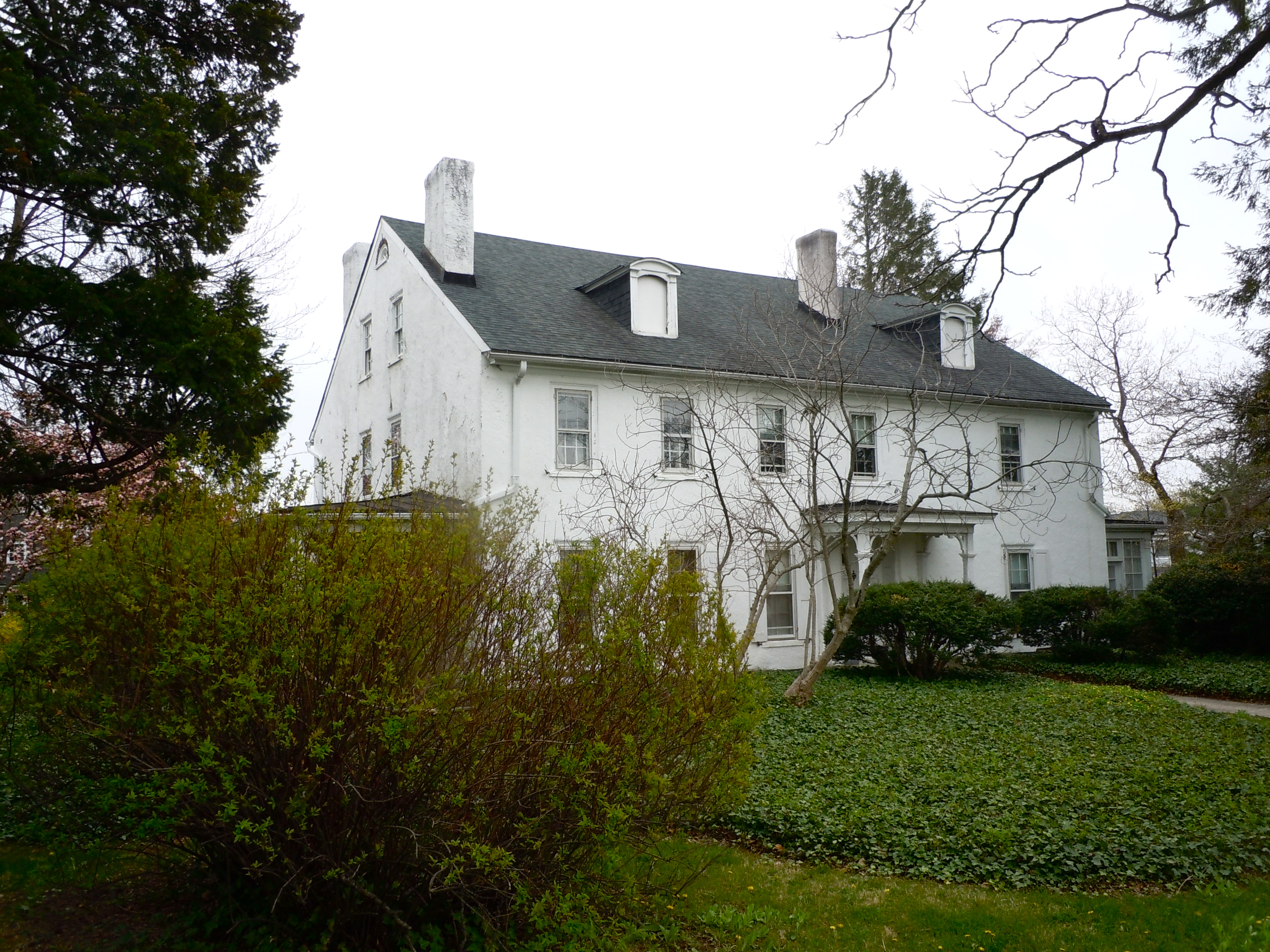
Thornfield, his boyhood home in Upper Darby Township, Pennsylvania

Garrett was born on August 21, 1789, in Upper Darby Township, Pennsylvania, outside Philadelphia, to Sarah Price and Thomas Garrett. The family were members of the Quaker Darby Friends Meeting. His family lived on their homestead called Riverview Farm.

In 1813, Garrett married Mary Sharpless, with whom he had five children. He became a member of the Wilmington Meeting when he moved to Wilmington, Delaware in 1822. Wilmington was advantageous for his career as it was a growing city. It was also well-suited for Underground Railroad activity as it was the last city before Philadelphia within a slave state. He established a station at his house at 227 Shipley Street.

Mary died in 1828. He married a second time in 1830 to Rachel Mendenhall, the daughter of Eli Mendenhall. They had a son.

When his father died in 1839, the original farm was split between Thomas's brothers Issac and Edward, who renamed their farms "Fernleaf Farm" and "Cleveland Farm", but much is preserved today as Arlington Cemetery. Thomas's house, "Thornfield", built around 1800 and in which he lived until 1822, still stands today (as a private residence) in what is now the Drexel Hill neighborhood of Upper Darby.

== Career ==
He established an iron and hardware business and made it prosper. In 1835, Garrett became a director of the new Wilmington Gas Company, which made gas "made from rosin, at $7 per 1,000 cubic feet" for lighting lamps. In 1836, he, Chandler, Joseph Whitaker, and other partners invested and revived the Principio Furnace in Perryville, Maryland, near an important crossing of the Susquehanna River at the top of the Chesapeake Bay.

== Anti-slavery activities ==
His life as an abolitionist began in earnest in 1813 when he was 24 years of age. A free black woman who worked for the Garretts was kidnapped by slave traders who intended to sell her into slavery in the Deep South. Garrett rescued her and determined to defend African Americans throughout his life.

=== Quaker and abolitionist ===
In the schism between Orthodox and Hicksite Quakers, Garrett split with his Orthodox family and moved to Wilmington in the neighboring slave state of Delaware to strike out on his own and pursue his struggle against slavery. In 1827 Society of the State of Delaware was reorganized as the Delaware Abolition Society, whose officers and directors included Garrett, William Chandler, president John Wales, vice-president Edward Worrell, and others. Later that year, Wales and Garrett represented the group at the National Convention of Abolitionists.

William Lloyd Garrison, whom Garrett admired greatly, once visited him. However, they held different views regarding the opposition to slavery. Garrison was willing to be a martyr to the abolition of slavery and would not defend himself if attacked physically. Garrett, on the other hand, believed slavery could only be abolished through a civil war and, when attacked physically, defended himself by subduing his attackers.

Thomas Garrett was the inspiration for the Harriet Beecher Stowe's abolitionist character, Simeon Halliday, in her famous novel, Uncle Tom’s Cabin. As was Garrett, Simeon was unafraid of risking fines or imprisonment for helping his fellow man. As Beecher Stowe was writing the follow-up volume in 1853, Garrett was encouraged by Charles Whipple, a Boston abolitionist, to send the author an account of his experiences on the front-lines of abolitionism.

=== Underground Railroad ===
Garrett openly worked as a stationmaster on the Underground Railroad in Delaware, working with William Still in Philadelphia and John Hunn further down the Delmarva Peninsula. Among those he helped was the family of Henry Highland Garnet. Because he openly defied slave hunters as well as the slave system, Garrett had no need of secret rooms in his house at 227 Shipley Street. The authorities were aware of his activities, but he was never arrested.

Garrett was also a friend and benefactor to the noted Underground Railroad Conductor Harriet Tubman, who passed through his station many times. In addition to lodging and meals, Garrett frequently provided her with money and shoes to continue her missions conducting runaways from slavery to freedom. Garrett also provided Tubman with the money and the means for her parents to escape from the South. Both were free people at the time Tubman rescued them, but Tubman's father faced arrest for secreting runaway slaves in his cabin.

The number of runaways Garrett assisted has sometimes been exaggerated. He said he "only helped 2,700" before the Civil War put an end to slavery.

=== Fugitive Slave Act trial ===
In 1848, Garrett and fellow Quaker John Hunn were sued in federal court for helping the Emeline and Samuel Hawkins family of seven slaves owned by two owners escape, although their lawyer colleague John Wales had managed to free them from imprisonment the previous year when a magistrate granted a writ of habeas corpus. The two slaveowners sued Hunn and Garrett. U.S. Supreme Court Chief Justice Roger B. Taney presided at the trial in the New Castle Court House and James A. Bayard Jr. acted as prosecutor. Garrett and Hunn were found guilty of violating the Fugitive Slave Act by helping a family of slaves escape. As the architect of the escape, Garrett received a $4,500 fine, later reduced to $1,500. According to Kathleen Lonsdale, referencing the American Friends Service Committee, "The fine was so heavy that it left him financially ruined, yet Thomas Garrett stood up in Court and said, "Judge thou has left me not a dollar, but I wish to say to thee and to all in this courtroom that if anyone knows a fugitive who wants a shelter and a friend, send him to Thomas Garrett and he will befriend him." This comment was made in response to the Judge saying to Garrett, "Thomas, I hope you will never be caught at this business again." A lien was put on his house until the fine was paid, and although Hunn ended up losing his house in a sheriff's sale, with the aid of friends, Garrett continued in his iron and hardware business and helping runaway slaves to freedom. By 1855, traffic through Garrett's station had increased, and Sydney Howard Gay noted that in 1855 to 1856 nearly 50 fugitives whom Garrett had helped arrived in New York.

=== American Civil War ===
During the American Civil War, the free African Americans of Wilmington guarded Garrett's house. When the 15th Amendment passed, giving black men the right to vote, Wilmington's African Americans carried Garrett through the streets in an open barouche with a sign: "Our Moses".

== Death ==
Garrett died in Wilmington on January 25, 1871, and he was buried at the Quaker Meeting House in Wilmington. Freed blacks carried his bier on their shoulders to his place of interment.

== Legacy ==
- In 1993, Wilmington named Tubman-Garrett Riverfront Park after the two Underground Railroad agents and friends.
- Pennsylvania and Delaware erected historical markers at sites associated with Garrett in the Drexel Hill neighborhood of Upper Darby and in Wilmington.
- His house, Thornfield, at 3218 Garrett Road, remains private property near the historic marker on Garrett Road in Upper Darby.

== See also ==
- List of Underground Railroad sites
