= Johnstown =

Johnstown may refer to:

== Places ==
=== Australia ===
- Johnstown, Queensland, a locality split between the Southern Burnett Region and the Gympie Region, Queensland

=== Canada ===
- Johnstown, Nova Scotia
- Johnstown, Ontario, United Counties of Leeds and Grenville
- Johnstown, Hastings County, Ontario
- Johnstown District, Upper Canada

=== Ireland ===
- Johnstown Castle, a Gothic Revival castle in County Wexford
- Johnstown, Dublin, a suburb
- Johnstown, Kilcumny, a townland in Kilcumny civil parish, County Westmeath
- Johnstown, County Kildare, a village
- Johnstown, County Kilkenny, a small town
- Johnstown, Killulagh, a townland in Killulagh civil parish, County Westmeath
- Monroe or Johnstown (Nugent), a townland in County Westmeath
- Johnstown, Templeoran, a townland in the barony of Moygoish, County Westmeath
- Johnstown, Killodiernan, a townland in North Tipperary
- Johnstown, Navan, a townland near Navan, County Meath

=== Northern Ireland ===
- Johnstown, County Armagh, a townland in Mullaghbrack civil parish, barony of Fews Lower, County Armagh

=== United States ===
- Johnstown, Colorado
- Johnstown, Illinois
- Johnstown, Indiana
- Johnstown, Kansas
- Johnstown, Maryland
- Johnstown, Missouri
- Johnstown, Nebraska, a village in Brown County
- Johnstown, New York
- Johnstown (town), New York
- Johnstown, North Dakota
- Johnstown, Ohio
- Johnstown, Pennsylvania, a city in Cambria County, Pennsylvania
  - Johnstown station
- Johnstown, West Virginia
- Johnstown, Wisconsin (disambiguation)
- Johnstown, Wyoming
- Johnstown Township, Michigan
- Johnstown Township, Grand Forks County, North Dakota, Grand Forks County, North Dakota

=== Wales ===
- Johnstown, Wrexham
- Johnstown, Carmarthenshire

== Other uses ==
- Johnstown (crater), a crater on Mars
- Johnstown (horse), an American Hall of Fame racehorse
- Johnstown (meteorite), a 1924 meteorite which fell in Colorado, United States
- Johnstown, a name briefly given to the Apollo program tracking/commutations ship Redstone
- Johnstown, a 1999 album by Canadian musician Oh Susanna

== See also ==
- Johnstown Flood (disambiguation)
- Jonestown (disambiguation)
- Johnsontown (disambiguation)
- Johnston (disambiguation)
- Johnstone, a town in Renfrewshire, Scotland, known as Johnstoun in Scots
- Johntown (disambiguation)
- Saint Johnstown (disambiguation)
