= Johnsontown =

Johnsontown may refer to several places in the United States:

- Johnsontown (Atlanta), a historical settlement in what is now the Buckhead Community of Atlanta, Georgia
- Johnsontown, Louisville, Kentucky
- Johnsontown, New York
- Johnsontown, Virginia
- Johnsontown, Berkeley County, West Virginia
- Johnsontown, Jefferson County, West Virginia

== See also ==
- Johnstown (disambiguation)
