= Effects of Hurricane Ida in the Northeastern United States =

Hurricane Ida
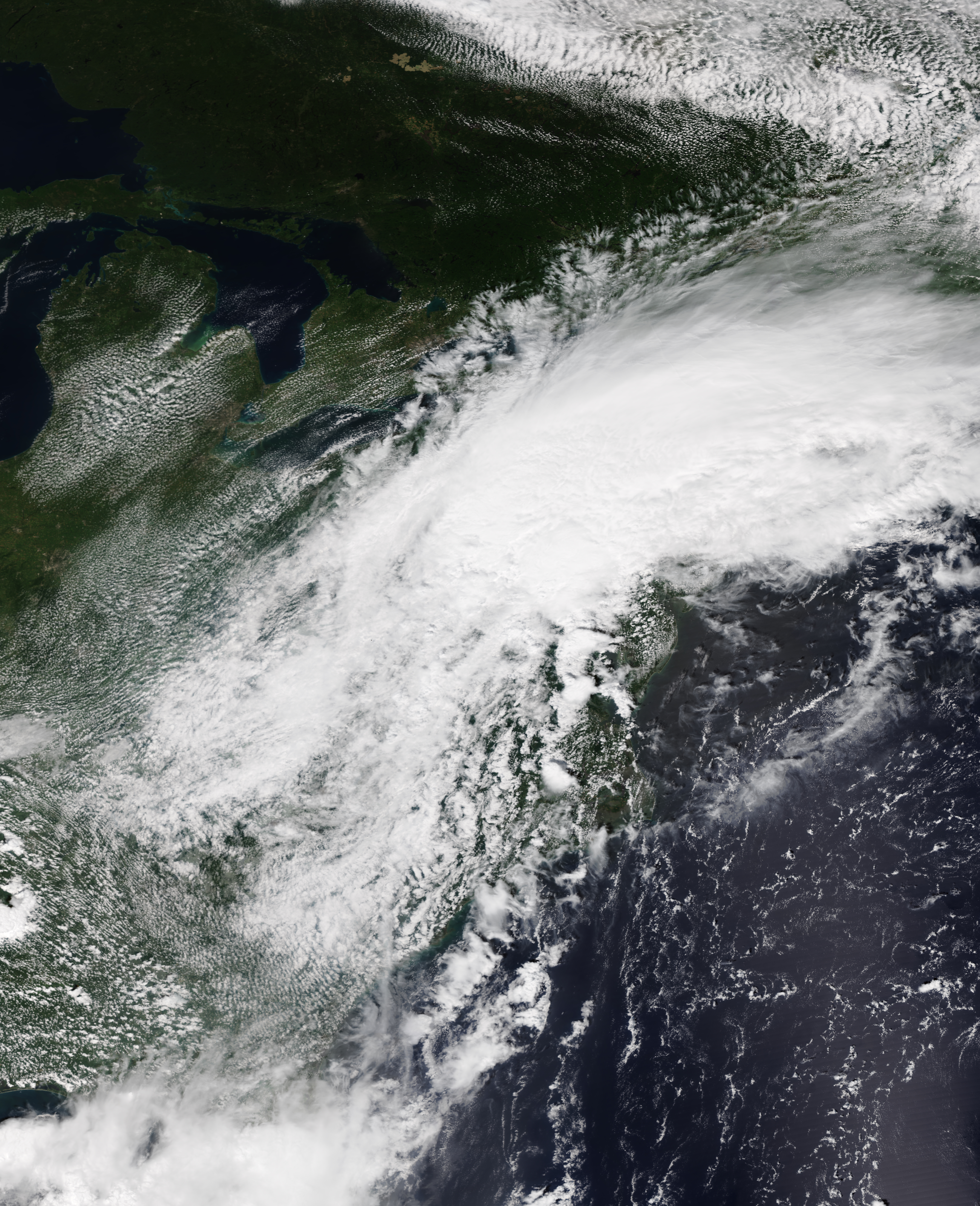
- Ida as a powerful extratropical storm over the Northeastern United States

Meteorological history
- Duration: September 1–2, 2021

Tropical storm
- 1-minute sustained (SSHWS/NWS)
- Highest winds: 40 mph (65 km/h)

Overall effects
- Fatalities: 58 (54 direct, 4 indirect)
- Damage: $20 billion (2019 USD)
- Areas affected: Maryland, Pennsylvania, New Jersey, New York State (especially New York City), Connecticut, Rhode Island, Massachusetts, New Hampshire, Maine
- Part of the 2021 Atlantic hurricane season
- Effects: Tornado outbreak; Northeastern US; Other wikis: Commons: Ida images

On September 1–2, 2021, Hurricane Ida affected much of the Northeastern United States as an extratropical cyclone, causing catastrophic river and flash flooding. Widespread flooding affected many areas, shutting down numerous roads, halting public transit, and cancelling hundreds of flights. Several rivers overflowed their banks, flooding farmlands, towns, and homes. Hundreds of cars were abandoned on roadways after being stranded in floodwaters and dozens of high-water rescues were performed. Several flash flood emergencies were issued due to the flooding.

The Vine Street Expressway in Philadelphia flooded after pumps failed.

The storm also produced a tornado outbreak that spawned seven tornadoes across Pennsylvania and New Jersey along with an additional weak tornado in Massachusetts. In Pennsylvania, an EF2 tornado caused severe damage and a fatality in Upper Dublin Township. One intense EF3 tornado passed near Mullica Hill, New Jersey damaging or destroying several homes. The same storm later produced EF1 tornado that tracked from Edgewater Park, New Jersey to Bristol, Pennsylvania and prompted a rare tornado emergency for both Bristol and Croydon, Pennsylvania, as well as Burlington, New Jersey. This was the first tornado emergency ever issued for a tropical cyclone as well as the first ever issued for the Northeastern United States.

At least 55 people died in the states of New Jersey, New York, Pennsylvania, Maryland, and Connecticut. CoreLogic estimated that Ida caused an estimated $16 to 24 billion in flooding damage in the Northeastern United States. The National Hurricane Center (NHC) estimated that Ida caused between $18 billion to $22.5 billion in damage in the Northeastern United States, with a median estimate of at least $20 billion in damages.

== Background ==
Ida was the third tropical system in a time period of several weeks to affect the Northeastern United States, after Tropical Storm Fred and Hurricane Henri in August. These storms dropped heavy rainfall, saturating the soil. New York City recorded 9.06 in (230 mm) from August 16 to 30, which became the second largest amount of rain New York City had in the second half of August on record. Water levels in rivers were also higher than average, leaving much of the region susceptible to flooding.

== Preparations ==
The Weather Prediction Center issued a High Risk of flash flooding for parts of West Virginia, Maryland, Pennsylvania, New Jersey, New York, and Connecticut. On August 31, the New York Mets game against the Miami Marlins scheduled for September 1 at Citi Field was postponed due to the approaching storm.

== Impact ==
Deaths in the Northeastern U.S.
| State | Total | Ref. |
|---|---|---|
| New Jersey | 31 | |
| New York | 17 | |
| Pennsylvania | 5 | |
| Maryland | 1 | |
| Connecticut | 1 | |
| 5 states | 55 deaths | |

=== Maryland and Delaware ===
In Maryland, A 19-year-old man was confirmed dead after flooding at an apartment complex in Rockville. In Frederick County, 10 students and their bus driver had to be rescued when their school bus was caught in flooding. An EF2 tornado caused considerable damage to homes, businesses, schools, and other structures as well as trees, signs, and power lines in Annapolis. Two other EF0 tornadoes also touched down in the state. In Wilmington, Delaware, over 200 people were rescued from flooding caused by the storm along the Brandywine Creek. The creek also reached a crest of 23.14 ft (7.05 m), a new record.

=== Pennsylvania ===
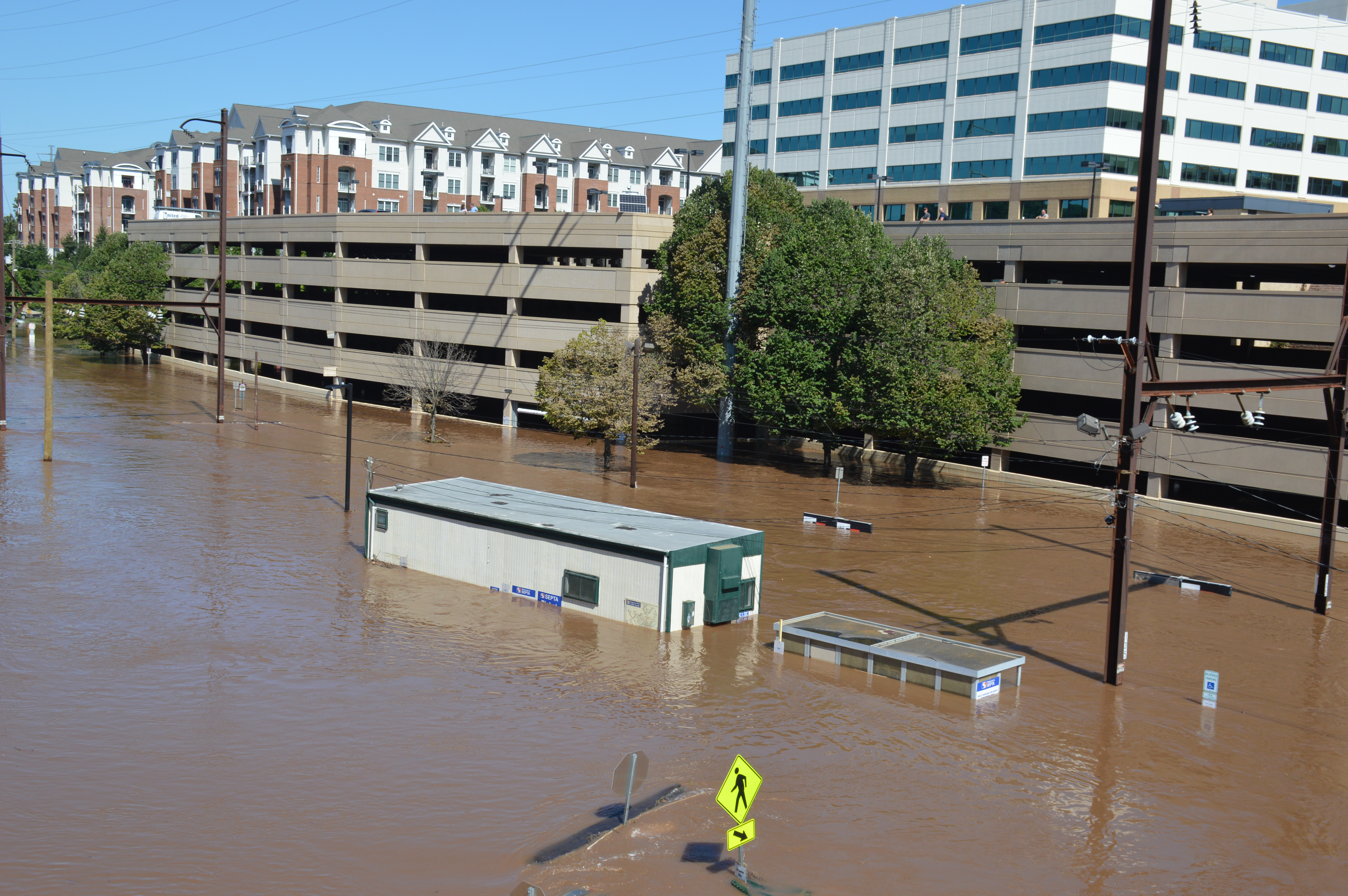
Flooding in Conshohocken, in Montgomery County, on September 2.

At least five people were killed in Pennsylvania. In Bucks County, a man drowned in his vehicle in the Unami Creek. The flooding was particularly severe on portions of Interstate 676, leading the highway to take several days to reopen, with a cost of $715,000 to repair. Parts of Pennsylvania Route 611 were closed for six months due to flooding. Four tornadoes touched down in the states while another one moved into the state out of New Jersey. A low-end EF2 tornado caused severe damage when it impacted the east side Oxford in Chester County. Another EF2 tornado caused severe damage in Fort Washington, Upper Dublin Township, and Horsham Township in Montgomery County, knocking down trees and power lines and tearing the roof off of the Upper Dublin Police Department. A woman was killed when a tree fell onto her house due to the tornado. Three EF1 tornadoes were confirmed in Bucks County, including one EF1 tornado that crossed the state line after striking Edgewater Park, New Jersey and struck Buckingham Township. In Pittsburgh, a bus with over 40 people had to be rescued. This tornado came from the same storm that produced the Mullica Hill, New Jersey EF3 tornado and this prompted the issuance of a tornado emergency for Burlington, New Jersey and Croydon, and Bristol, Pennsylvania, the first of its kind in the Northeast, as well as the first such alert associated with a tropical cyclone. Bucks County was also under a flash flood emergency at the time, marking one of the few times that these emergency alerts were issued for the same area. Damage in Pennsylvania amounted to anywhere between $2.5 billion and $3.5 billion.

=== New Jersey ===
The remnants of Ida producing flash flooding and severe weather across the Northeastern United States.

All of the New Jersey Transit, except for the Atlantic City Line was shut down due to the storm. Newark International Airport was shut down, cancelling more than 400 flights, and shutting down the airport parking lot. Ida significantly contributed to Newark's wettest September on record. In Millburn, Essex County, the Rahway River overflowed its banks, flooding the downtown area. More than 100 rescues were conducted. People were evacuated to the Millburn Library. In nearby Livingston, the Canoe Brook overflowed its banks, and flooding damaged several police, fire department, and public works vehicles. One fire department SUV was swept away while rescuing a person in a trapped car. Around 500 rescues occurred in Manville, Somerset County, and 100 houses were estimated to be uninhabitable. Manville Office of Emergency Management Director John Bentz stated that the Raritan River crested on the morning of September 3 at 27.6 ft (8.4 m), beating Hurricane Floyd of 1999. In nearby Bound Brook, a NJ Transit train was stuck in floodwaters. Nearby in Newark, the city realized their wettest day on record with 8.41 in (214 mm) of rain pouring down. Three tornadoes touched down in the state, which were all produced by the same supercell. An EF3 tornado with winds of 150 mph (240 km/h) damaged or destroyed many homes and tossed cars in Mullica Hill, New Jersey. One unanchored frame home was completely leveled and two people were injured by the tornado. The same storm later produced an EF1 tornado that prompted the tornado emergency mentioned above. The storm crossed back later crossed back into New Jersey, and produced its final tornado, which caused EF0 tree damage in Princeton. In Hopewell, New Jersey, Interstate 295 was shut down due to flooding. A total of 30 people were killed in New Jersey, making Ida the second deadliest tropical cyclone in the history of the state, behind Hurricane Sandy. Damage in New Jersey amounted to anywhere between $8 billion and $10 billion.

=== New York State ===
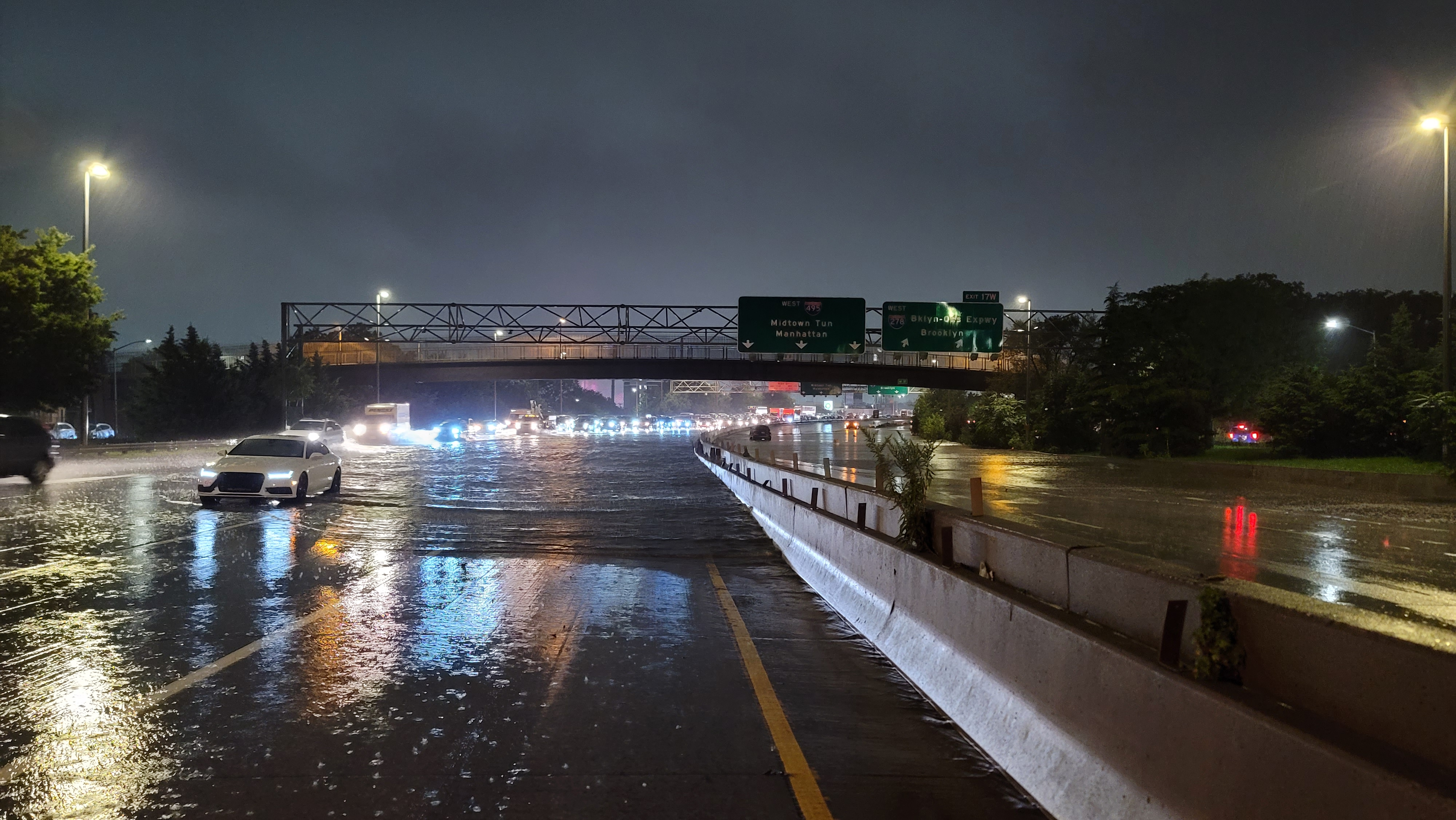
The Long Island Expressway in New York City shut down due to flooding from the remnants of Hurricane Ida.

At least three people were killed in Westchester County. More than 200 cars were abandoned on roads. A man was killed near the Saw Mill River Parkway after his car was submerged. A total of 18 people died in New York State. The New York State Thruway between exits 12 and 14 was temporarily shut down. Initial estimates, according to New York Governor Kathy Hochul, said flooding caused more than $50 million in damage in New York State. However, more updated numbers reveal damage in New York amounted to between $7.5 billion and $9 billion.

==== New York City and Long Island ====
The National Weather Service issued their first ever flash flood emergency for New York City during the storm. In the New York Subway System, 17 trains were trapped and service was halted until the morning of September 2. Everyone trapped was evacuated, with no casualties. Damage to the subway system was $75 million. At the US Open tennis site in Flushing in New York City, 18 people were rescued. A total of 13 people were killed in New York City, with 11 of them occurring when basements of apartments flooded. In one of the incidents, a toddler was killed. A man's body was recovered from the Gowanus Canal late on September 2. New York City saw a record amount of rainfall in one hour, from 8:51-9:51pm on September 1, at 3.15 in (80 mm), with records for 2-hour and 3-hour rainfall as well. LaGuardia Airport recorded their wettest day on record, with 6.80 in (173 mm) of rain, while Central Park recorded their 5th wettest day with 7.13 in (181 mm) of rain. The maximum amount of rainfall in Staten Island of 8.92 inches (227 mm) made it the 9th wettest tropical cyclone in New York. The flooding was so bad that Bill de Blasio had to ban all non-essential travel on roads until 5am on September 2. The West Shore Expressway was shut down due to flooding, and much of the Staten Island Railway was shut down as well.

By the morning of September 2, more than 13,200 homes had lost power on Long Island and the Long Island Railroad had suspended service systemwide. Caumsett State Historic Park Preserve suffered heavy damage and was forced to close after the storm.

=== New England ===
During the storm, the first ever flash flood emergency for the state of Connecticut was issued. A Connecticut State Trooper sergeant was hospitalized after he and his police vehicle were swept away by floodwaters from the Pomperaug River in Litchfield County, early on September 2. He died later that day. Parts of Connecticut received over 7 in (180 mm) of rain, with a peak total of 8.72 in (221 mm) of rain in Seymour. The state of Connecticut saw 20,000 power outages. Multiple roads closed due to flooding. An EF0 tornado was spawned in Dennis, Massachusetts, causing minor damage to two homes and knocking down three large oak trees. In New Hampshire, heavy rainfall fell, up to 4.24 in (108 mm) in Hudson. However, there were no reports of flash flooding in the state.

== Aftermath ==
States of emergency were declared in New York, including in New York City, New Jersey, and Connecticut. President of the United States Joe Biden stated that the Federal Emergency Management Agency (FEMA) was responding to the catastrophe. On September 2, Amtrak was forced to suspend the entire Northeast Corridor for a day due to storm damage.

=== New Jersey ===
Several New Jersey public school districts delayed or cancelled classes because of flooding or severe weather damage. Newark Liberty International Airport suffered flooding in the terminals, and all departures were grounded. Operations continued the following morning with flight delays and cancellations. On September 2, it was announced that, because of the major flooding around SHI Stadium, the Rutgers–Temple home opener game would be postponed. TD Bank Ballpark, which was submerged underwater from Ida, re-opened on September 11, after 3 games against the Hartford Yard Goats were moved to Dunkin' Park. Governor of New Jersey Phil Murphy toured Mullica Hill. He said that the state needed improved infrastructure. Murphy said he would be requesting a major disaster declaration from the federal government, and promised to discuss storm-response measures with President Biden late on September 2. On September 5th President Biden approved the major disaster declaration, and the year after the declaration FEMA, reports that New Jersey has received more than 873 million in federal funds which consist of housing assistance and other needs assistance.

Murphy called the flooding "historic by any measure." Murphy also attributed the storm to climate change, saying that "there's no denying it". The governor toured downtown Millburn. He stated that businesses and non-profits with up to 50 employees that were damaged by Hurricane Ida would be qualified for up to $5,000 in repercussions. Despite this, however, he was extensively criticized for his late declaration of a state of emergency, which many Republicans said lead to additional deaths leading up to the 2021 New Jersey gubernatorial election.

=== New York ===
Governor of New York Kathy Hochul said that the state needed "massive cleanup". The New York City Department of Buildings investigated the conditions of the basements where people had drowned during Ida. Five of the six basements were found to be illegally-converted apartments. Mayor of New York Bill de Blasio presented the Climate Driven Rain Response Plan, which is expected to create a new and improved warning system. De Blasio also announced the formation of the 30-day Extreme Weather Response Task Force to look into how the city could be more ready to face such weather. The mayor also laid out the potential for travel restrictions, door-to-door warnings, phone alerts, and faster evacuations in the future. On September 6, President Biden approved Hochul's request for a major disaster declaration. On the same day, FEMA Administrator Deanne Criswell, De Blasio, Senator Chuck Schumer, and Congresswoman Alexandria Ocasio-Cortez visited Queens, one of the hardest-hit areas in New York City. AOC attributed the impacts to climate change, and also said that "[we] needed more advance notice from the [National Weather Service]." She also stated that most of the flooding was caused by problems with the sewer system.

Governor Kathy Hochul and Mayor Bill de Blasio allocated $27 million to assist undocumented residents who are not eligible for FEMA relief funds.

New York City has made several long term projects to improve flood control in the aftermath of Ida, including 2300 curbside gardens. Additionally, New York City got funding from the Inflation Reduction Act to be able to prevent future floods like Ida.
