= Johntown =

Johntown may refer to:

- Johntown, Georgia
- Johntown, Nevada

== See also ==
- Johnstown (disambiguation)
