= St John's Town =

St John's Town may refer to:

- St John's Town of Dalry, Scotland
- An old name for Perth, Scotland

== See also ==
- Saint Johnstown (disambiguation)
