= Jonestown (disambiguation) =

Jonestown was the site of the 1978 mass suicide-and-murder of the Peoples Temple cult in northwestern Guyana.

Jonestown may also refer to:

== Other places ==
- Jonestown, Mahaica, Guyana
- Jonestown, Indiana
- Jonestown, Baltimore, Maryland
- Jonestown, Howard County, Maryland
- Jonestown, Coahoma County, Mississippi
- Jonestown, Jackson County, Ohio
- Jonestown, Van Wert County, Ohio
- Jonestown, Columbia County, Pennsylvania
- Jonestown, Lebanon County, Pennsylvania
- Jonestown, Texas
- Jonestown, County Offaly, a townland in County Offaly, Ireland

== Music ==
- Jonestown (D-Sisive album) (2009)
- Jonestown (Sofia Talvik album) (2008) or its title track
- "Jonestown" (Concrete Blonde song), 1993
- "Jonestown", a composition by Frank Zappa from Boulez Conducts Zappa: The Perfect Stranger
- 'Jonestown (Interlude)", a song by Post Malone from Beerbongs & Bentleys

== Other uses ==
- Jonestown: The Life and Death of Peoples Temple, a 2006 documentary film
- Jonestown: The Power and the Myth of Alan Jones, a 2006 biographical book
- Jonestown: Paradise Lost, a 2007 documentary film

== See also ==
- Johnstown (disambiguation)
- Youngstown
- Jones Town (disambiguation)
- The Brian Jonestown Massacre
