= Hurricane Ida =

Category 4 Atlantic hurricane in 2021

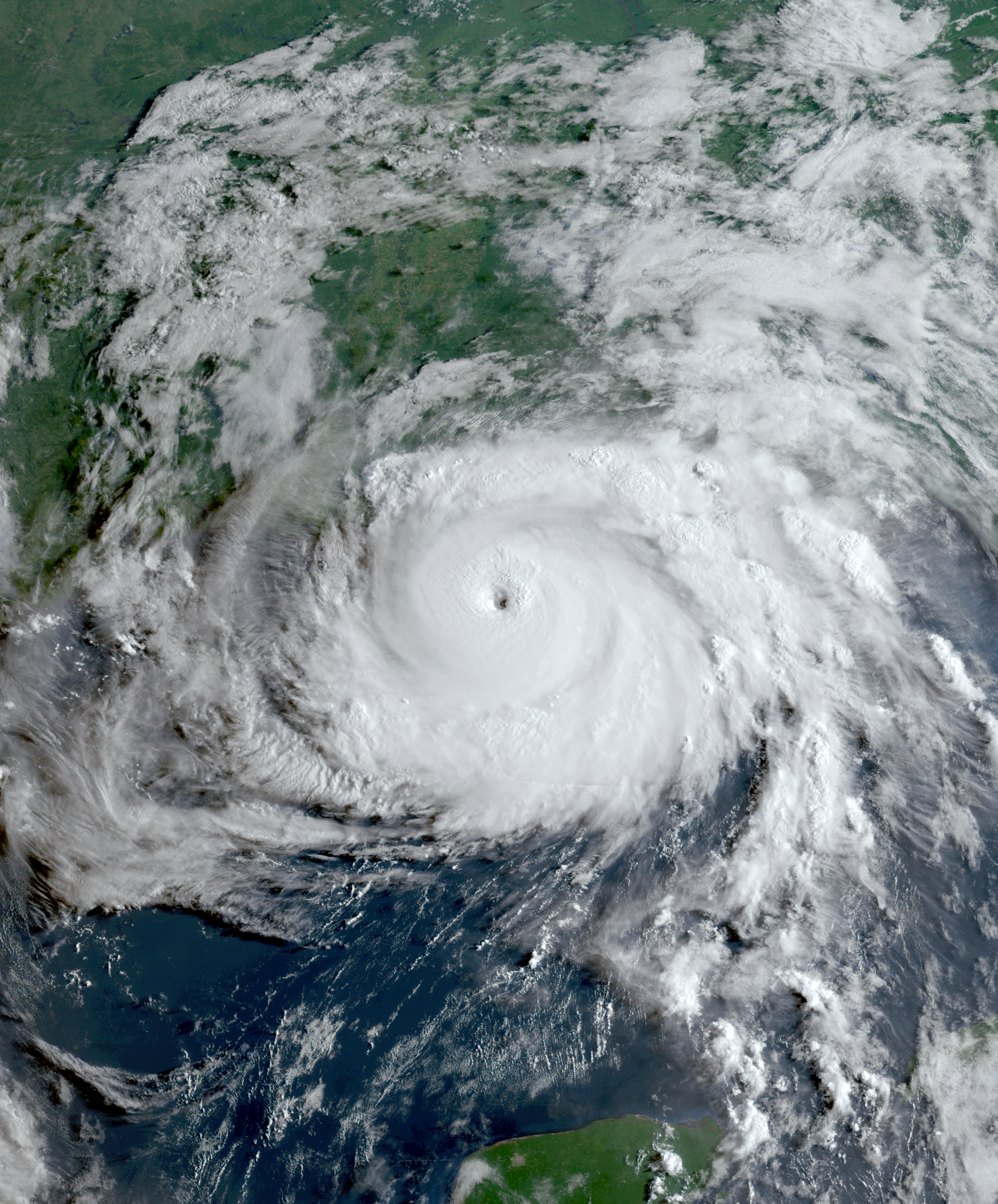
- Hurricane Ida at peak intensity nearing landfall in Louisiana on August 29

Meteorological history
- Formed: August 26, 2021
- Extratropical: September 1, 2021
- Dissipated: September 5, 2021

Category 4 major hurricane
- 1-minute sustained (SSHWS/NWS)
- Highest winds: 150 mph (240 km/h)
- Lowest pressure: 929 mbar (hPa); 27.43 inHg

Overall effects
- Fatalities: 112 total (60 direct, 52 indirect)
- Damage: $75.3 billion (2021 USD) (Seventh-costliest tropical cyclone on record; Fifth-costliest in U.S history)
- Areas affected: Venezuela, Colombia, Jamaica, Cayman Islands, Cuba, Gulf Coast of the United States (mainly Louisiana), East Coast of the United States (mainly the Northeastern U.S.), Atlantic Canada
- IBTrACS
- Part of the 2021 Atlantic hurricane season
- Effects: Tornado outbreak; Northeastern US; Other wikis: Commons: Ida images

Hurricane Ida was a deadly and extremely destructive tropical cyclone that became the second-most damaging and intense hurricane to make landfall in the U.S. state of Louisiana on record, behind Hurricane Katrina in 2005. In terms of maximum sustained winds at landfall (150 mph or 240 km/h), Ida tied with 2020's Hurricane Laura and the 1856 Last Island hurricane as the strongest on record to hit Louisiana. The remnants of the storm also caused a tornado outbreak and catastrophic flooding across the Northeastern United States.

The ninth named storm, fourth hurricane, and second major hurricane of the 2021 Atlantic hurricane season, Ida originated from a tropical wave in the Caribbean Sea on August 23. On August 26, the wave developed into a tropical depression, which organized further and became Tropical Storm Ida later that day, near Grand Cayman. Amid favorable conditions, Ida intensified into a hurricane on August 27, just before moving over western Cuba. A day later, the hurricane underwent rapid intensification over the Gulf of Mexico, and reached its peak intensity as a strong Category 4 hurricane while approaching the northern Gulf Coast, with maximum sustained winds of 150 mph (240 km/h) and a minimum central pressure of 929 millibars (27.4 inHg).

On August 29, Ida made landfall near Port Fourchon, Louisiana, devastating the town of Grand Isle. Ida weakened steadily over land, becoming a tropical depression on August 30, as it turned northeastward. On September 1, Ida transitioned into a post-tropical cyclone as it accelerated through the Northeastern United States, breaking multiple rainfall records in various locations before moving out into the Atlantic on the next day. Afterward, Ida's remnant moved into the Gulf of St. Lawrence and stalled there for a couple of days, before being absorbed into another developing low-pressure area early on September 5.

The precursor to Ida caused catastrophic and deadly flash flooding in Venezuela. Ida knocked down palm trees and destroyed many homes in Cuba during its brief passage over the country. Throughout its path of destruction in Louisiana, more than a million people in total had no electrical power. Widespread heavy infrastructural damage occurred throughout the southeastern portion of the state, as well as extremely heavy flooding in coastal areas. New Orleans' levees survived (unlike during Katrina), though power line damage was extensive throughout the whole city. There was also substantial plant destruction in the state. Numerous tornadoes were spawned by Ida as it moved over the Eastern United States. The remnants of the storm produced unexpectedly severe damage in the Northeastern United States between September 1 and 2. Several intense tornadoes and catastrophic flash flooding swept through the entire region, which had already been impacted by several tropical cyclones, Elsa, Fred, and Henri during July and August. The flooding in New York City prompted the shutdown of much of the transportation system.

Ida is the sixth-costliest tropical cyclone on record, and the fifth-costliest Atlantic hurricane in the United States, having caused at least $75.25 billion (2021 USD) in damages. Of this total, at least $18 billion was in insured losses in Louisiana, $250 million was in Cuba, and $584 million was from agriculture damage in the U.S., surpassing Hurricane Ike of 2008. CoreLogic estimated that Ida caused an estimated $16 to 24 billion in flooding damage in the Northeastern United States, making it the costliest storm to hit the region since Hurricane Sandy in 2012, with an estimated $44 billion in insured loss.

A total of 112 deaths were attributed to Ida, including 92 in the United States and 20 in Venezuela. In the United States, 32 deaths were in New Jersey, 30 in Louisiana, 18 in New York, 5 in Pennsylvania, 2 in Mississippi, 2 in Alabama, 2 in Maryland, 1 in Connecticut, and 1 in Virginia. There was also a remarkable number of hospitalizations and deaths in the Greater New Orleans Area as a result of carbon monoxide poisoning while using portable gas generators with inadequate ventilation, including three in a family of four in Marrero, Louisiana on September 1, 2021.

== Meteorological history ==
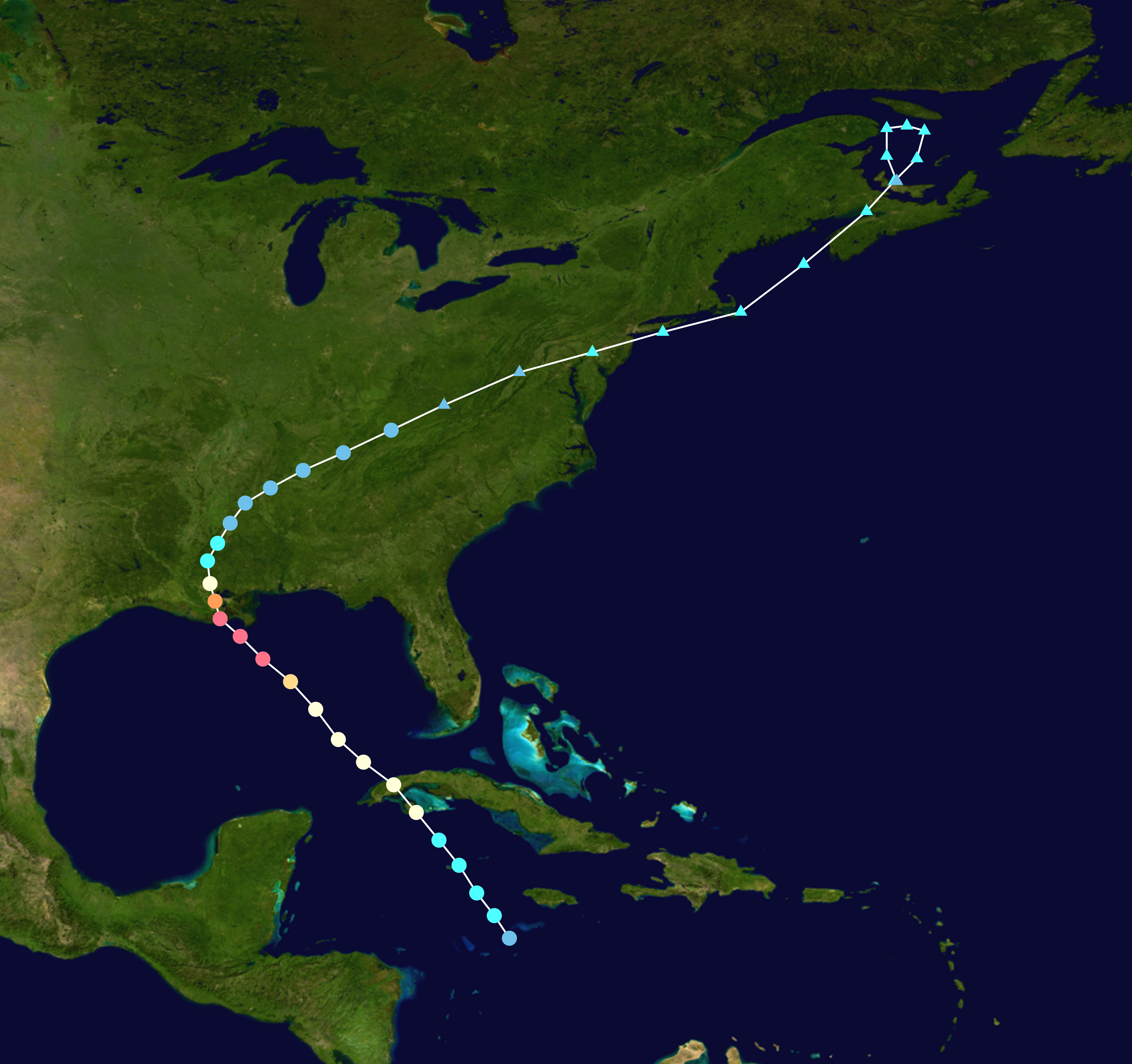
Map plotting the storm's track and intensity, according to the Saffir–Simpson scale Map key Saffir–Simpson scale Tropical depression (≤38 mph, ≤62 km/h) Tropical storm (39–73 mph, 63–118 km/h) Category 1 (74–95 mph, 119–153 km/h) Category 2 (96–110 mph, 154–177 km/h) Category 3 (111–129 mph, 178–208 km/h) Category 4 (130–156 mph, 209–251 km/h) Category 5 (≥157 mph, ≥252 km/h) Unknown Storm type Tropical cyclone Subtropical cyclone Extratropical cyclone, remnant low, tropical disturbance, or monsoon depression

A weak tropical wave moved off the coast of Africa and moved into the Atlantic Ocean on August 14. The wave moved slowly westward through the monsoon trough without showing any signs of organization over the next several days. On August 21, the wave entered a trade wind environment west of 45°W accompanied by a large area of convection, or thunderstorms, that was elongated from east to west. As the wave moved over the Windward Islands, the convective coverage increased at which point the National Hurricane Center (NHC) began to the track the system as it continued westward into the Caribbean Sea. The next day, the wave interacted with a broad area of low-pressure over the north coast of South America, which led to the formation of a much larger broad low-pressure characterized by spots that were near or below 1006 mbar (29.71 inHg) over the southwestern Caribbean Sea by late the same day. On August 25, a vorticity maximum emerged from the eastern side of the larger low-pressure area and convection became concentrated and better organized around it, prompting the NHC to assess this disturbance as a high likelihood of development as it turned north-northwestward. The system continued to further organize and obtain a better defined circulation the next day to the south of Jamaica. At 12:00 UTC on August 26, the system had attained sufficient organization to be classified as Tropical Depression Nine, about 115 mi (185 km) south-southwest of Negril, Jamaica. Upon its development, the depression was moving north-northwestward before turning northwestward a few hours later, steered around the southwestern side of a subtropical ridge located over the western Atlantic Ocean. Favorable factors in the system's further development included warm waters of the northwestern Caribbean Sea, low wind shear, and a moist environment.

Late on August 26, at 18:00 UTC, a Hurricane Hunters flight indicated that the depression intensified into Tropical Storm Ida 130 mi (210 km) Southeast of Grand Cayman, Cayman Islands. Initially, the storm had an asymmetric structure, with its strongest winds and deepest convection located east of the center. This was due to some southwesterly wind shear, which gradually lessened. As Ida moved through the Cayman Islands and toward northwestern Cuba, its structure improved, with more outflow and rainbands. The convection also organized into a central dense overcast (CDO). Ida then rapidly intensified, with its winds increasing by 35 mph (55 km/h) in just over 11 hours. Late on August 27, at 18:00 UTC, the NHC upgraded Ida to Category 1 hurricane status, based on observations made by the Hurricane Hunters. Around the same time, the hurricane made its first landfall on Cuba's Isle of Youth with sustained winds of 80 mph (130 km/h) and a minimum central pressure of 987 mbar (29.15 inHg). After crossing over, Ida made its second landfall at 23:25 UTC at Playa Dayaniguas in Pinar del Río, Cuba, with the same winds speeds and a slightly higher 988 mbar (29.18 inHg) pressure. The system continued northwestward and its center emerged over the southeastern Gulf of Mexico between 01:00–02:00 UTC on August 28. Although it did not lose any strength, land interaction and entrainment of dry air into the hurricane's southwestern quadrant as Ida crossed Cuba inhibited further intensification, and little change in strength occurred during the first several hours after it reached the Gulf.

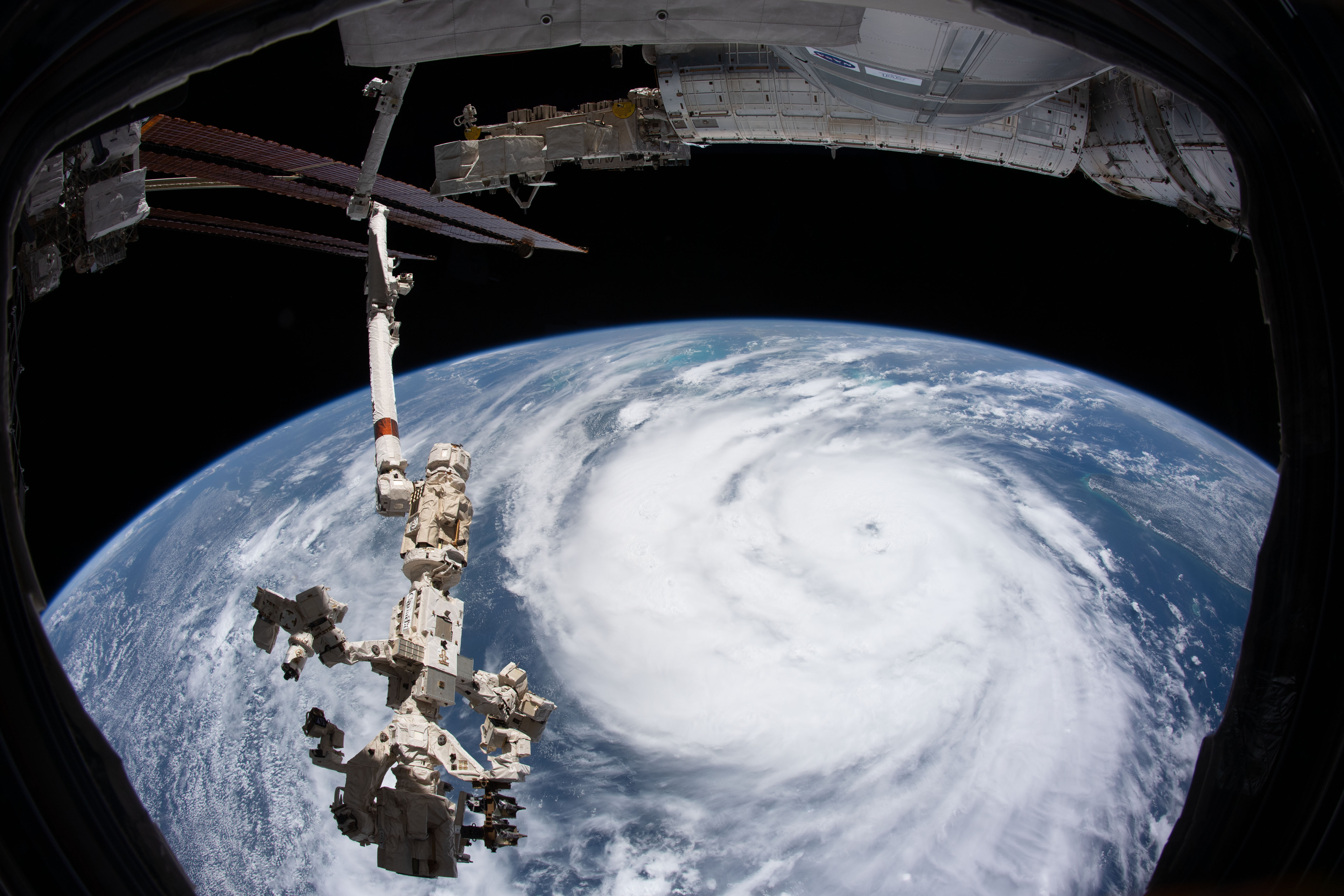
Hurricane Ida rapidly intensifying in the Gulf of Mexico on August 28 viewed from the ISS

During the daytime hours of August 28, microwave satellite imagery and Cuban radar data showed Ida's central core to be reorganizing with the formation of a convective ring around the center. This, combined with the favorable conditions of light vertical wind shear and warm sea surface temperatures, led to a second, and more significant, period of rapid intensification that commenced around 12:00 UTC on August 28. Ida intensified to Category 2 strength by 00:00 UTC on August 29, and into a Category 4 hurricane six hours later, as it moved northwestward toward the Louisiana coast. At around 12:00 UTC that day, Ida reached its peak intensity, with 1-minute sustained wind speeds of 150 mph (240 km/h) and a minimum central barometric pressure of 929 mbar (27.43 inHg), while located not far southwest the mouth of the Mississippi River. During this intensification phase, the maximum winds increased 70 mph (110 km/h) and the central pressure dropped 57 mbar (1.683 inHg). At peak, the hurricane displayed a pronounced satellite presentation, with a near-symmetrical structure and a well-defined eye with an impressive stadium effect visible. Strengthening was then halted as the storm began an eyewall replacement cycle, forming a second, larger eyewall around the first one, but Ida remained near its peak intensity. At 16:55 UTC, Ida made its third, and final, landfall near Port Fourchon, Louisiana, with sustained winds of 150 mph (240 km/h) and a central pressure of 931 mbar (27.49 inHg), tying the 1856 Last Island hurricane and Hurricane Laura as the strongest landfalling hurricane on record in Louisiana, as measured by maximum sustained wind, and trailing only Hurricane Katrina, as measured by central pressure at landfall. A ship at sea near the point of landfall verified this intensity, with reported gusts as high as 172 mph (277 km/h).

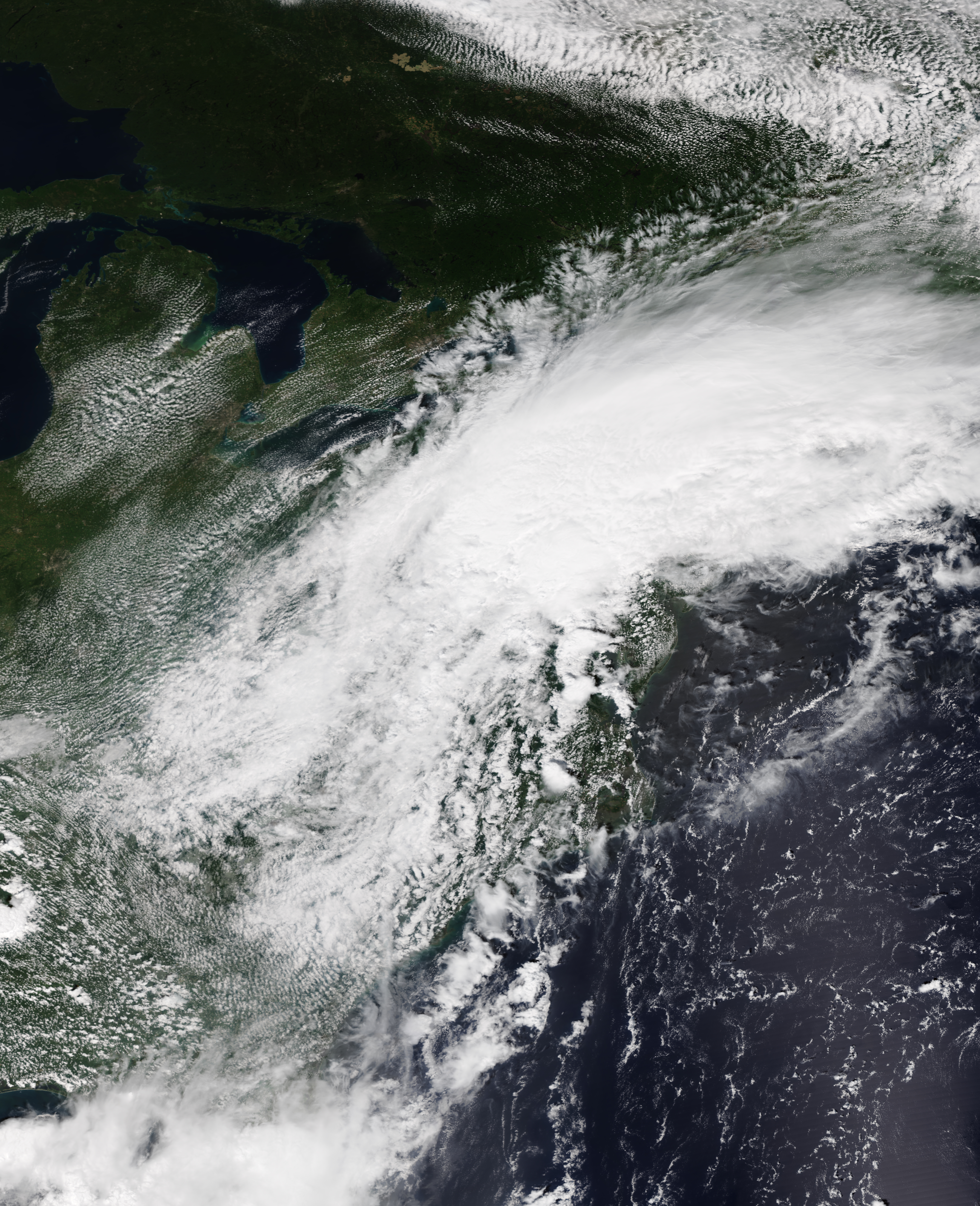
Ida as an extratropical cyclone over the Northeastern United States on September 1

Following landfall, Ida only slowly weakened at first, remaining a dangerous major hurricane. Mesovortices were also visible within the eye. Ida retained Category 4 winds for four hours following landfall, and then Category 3 status for the next four hours, due to the brown ocean effect, as the marshlands and the flat terrain in southern Louisiana allowed Ida to retain its intensity for a longer period of time. As the storm moved further inland, the majority of its cloud cover shifted northeast of the center, and Ida began a period of rapid weakening. It dropped below hurricane strength early on August 30 before weakening to a depression later that day. At that time, the NHC issued their last advisory on Ida, transferring the responsibility for continuing advisories to the Weather Prediction Center (WPC). The system degenerated into an extratropical low two days later, as it moved over the central Appalachian Mountains. As the system moved through the Northeastern United States on September 1–2, it combined with a frontal zone to unleash unprecedented rainfall across the region, regaining tropical-storm-force winds in the process, before moving out into the Atlantic. On the next day, Ida's remnants moved northeastward across Atlantic Canada, bringing heavy rain and gale-force winds to communities throughout the region. Ida's remnants reached the Gulf of St. Lawrence on September 3, where it made a slow, counter clockwise loop while maintaining maximum winds of 45–50 mph (75–85 km/h). The low degenerated to a trough late the next day as a new mid-latitude low formed to the east.

== Preparations ==
=== Caribbean ===
==== Cayman Islands ====
On August 26, 2021, the Cayman Islands were put under a Tropical Storm Warning. With the expectation of a landfall or near landfall on Grand Cayman, schools and businesses were closed, and the government had fully activated the NEOC and the Emergency Services, in addition to deploying the Cayman Islands Regiment and Cayman Islands Coast Guard for the HADR and SAR operations. Many people piled into grocery stores and hardware stores to grab supplies having Hurricane Grace that hit Cayman just a week earlier fresh in everyone's minds. Cayman Airways cancelled some of its flights and rescheduled them for a later day.The utility company had announced that they were planning on little to no power outages.

==== Cuba ====
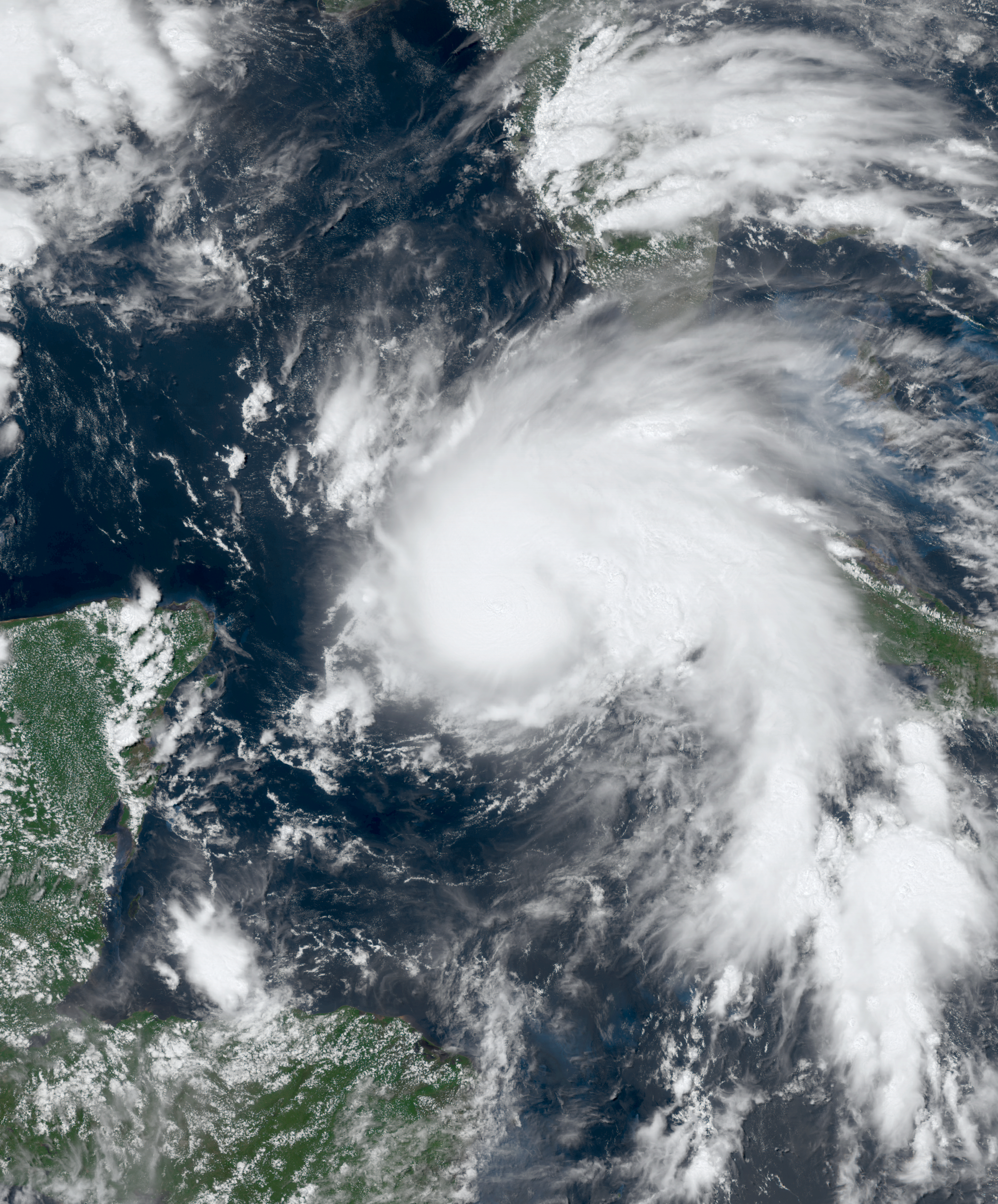
Hurricane Ida making its first landfall in Cuba late on August 27

On August 28, 800 individuals, including teachers and students monitoring turtles on the Guanahacabibes Peninsula, were evacuated due to Ida, according to the head of civil defense in the area. La Palma also sheltered 6,281 people from the storm.

=== United States ===
Tornado watches were issued for parts of Louisiana, Alabama, and Mississippi on August 29. The Storm Prediction Center issued a 5% tornado risk the same day for the three states, which included an overall slight risk. Over 16 ft (4.9 m) of storm surge was anticipated for Louisiana, 6–9 ft (1.8–2.7 m) for Mississippi, 3–5 ft (0.91–1.52 m) for Alabama, and 1–3 ft (0.30–0.91 m) for Florida. A high risk for flash flooding was issued on August 29, encompassing much of New Orleans and surrounding areas. A widespread area of 15–20 in (380–510 mm) of rainfall was forecasted the day Ida made landfall. Approximately 95% of U.S. oil production in the Gulf of Mexico was shut down. As of September 17, the insured damages from Ida in the United States is estimated at $31–44 billion, with $25–35 billion in the Gulf region and $6–9 billion in the Northeast.

==== Louisiana ====
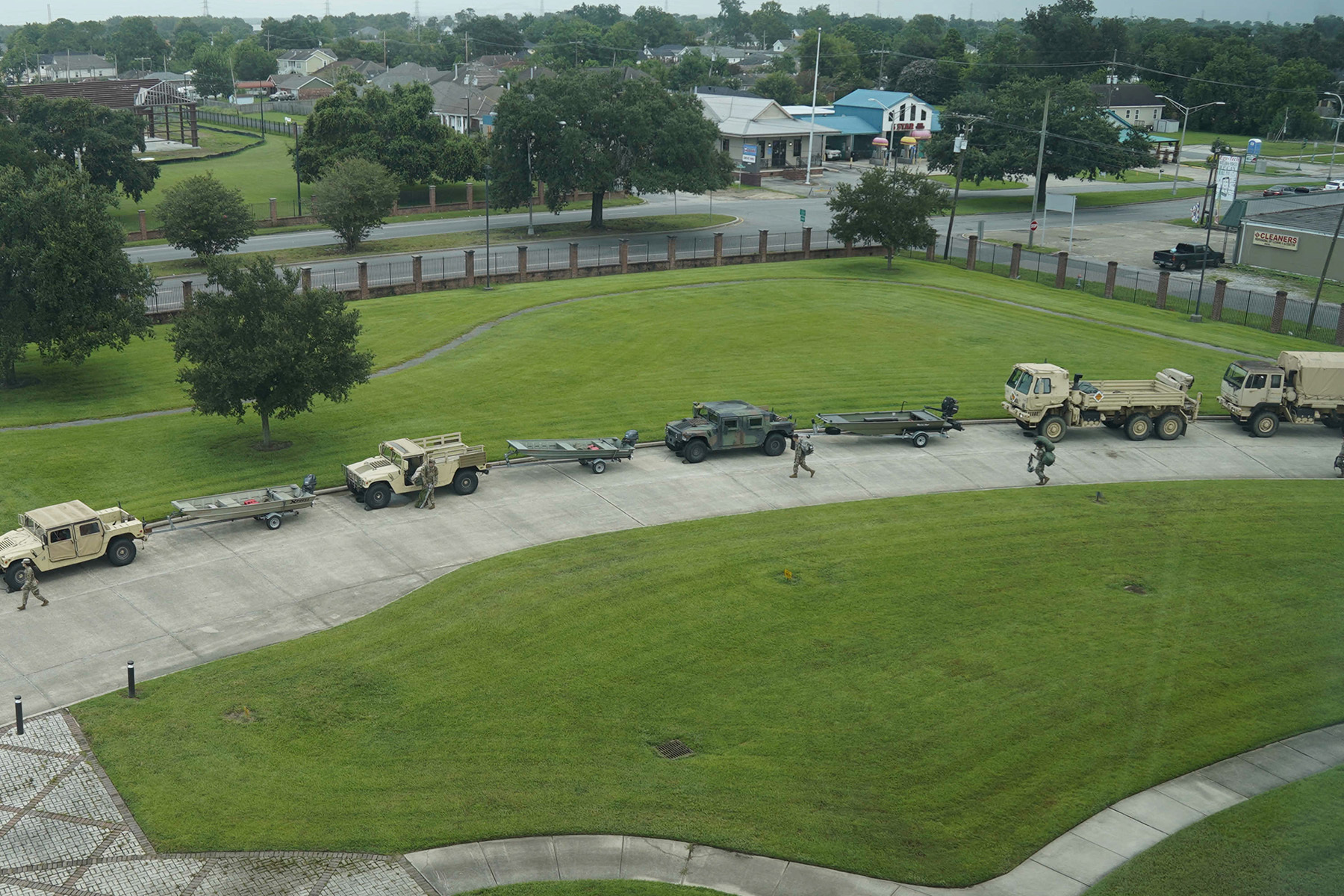
The Louisiana National Guard making preparations for the storm

On August 27, the preseason NFL football game for the Arizona Cardinals and New Orleans Saints, originally scheduled for the next day at Caesars Superdome, was cancelled due to the storm's forecast of being a major hurricane at the time of its landfall. Before this, the game's start was moved to noon CDT from the originally scheduled 7 PM CDT. Governor John Bel Edwards declared a state of emergency in response to the storm. On August 28, New Orleans mayor LaToya Cantrell issued a mandatory evacuation for all parts of the city which are outside of its flood protections area. That same day, President Joe Biden signed an emergency declaration for Louisiana ahead of the storm.

In a briefing that was held on August 28, one day prior to landfall, Edwards anticipated Ida to be one of the strongest hurricanes to affect the state since the 1850s. The Governor also mentioned the levee system in New Orleans, saying Ida "will be the most severe test of that system". This comes after the 2005 levee failures in Greater New Orleans during Katrina. The state's hospital capacities were of concern, due to them already being pushed to near full capacity from the COVID-19 surge that was ongoing at the time. Victims of Ida were expected to fill hospitals in affected areas.

==== Mississippi ====
In Mississippi, at least 15 school districts and universities were ordered to close on Monday, August 30, along with a dozen casinos ahead of the impact of the storm. Entergy Mississippi expected significant damage to the system in the Jackson metropolitan area.

==== Elsewhere ====
On August 30, rains were still expected in southeastern Louisiana, coastal Mississippi, and a warning of heavy rainfall was issued for southwestern Alabama. Similar warnings were issued for the coming hours for the valleys of Tennessee and Ohio as well as the Mid-Atlantic region as the storm moves further north. Tens of millions were at risk for heavy rainfall, flooding, and tornadoes on September 1. More than 14.5 million were put under an enhanced risk that was issued that same day by the SPC. This included a 10% tornado risk. Extreme rainfall was expected for New York City, with Central Park possibly seeing more than September's monthly average in just one day. Flash flood watches were issued at 2 p.m. EDT on September 1 for all five boroughs, including Long Island and Orange, Putnam, Rockland, Ulster, Dutchess, Sullivan, and Westchester counties. The watch extended to Hudson, Bergen, Essex, and Union counties in New Jersey. In Pennsylvania, Governor Tom Wolf signed a proclamation of disaster emergency on August 31 in anticipation of flooding, severe storms, and tornadoes from the remnants of Ida.

== Impact ==
=== Caribbean ===
As a tropical wave, Ida triggered flooding in western Venezuela on August 23, killing 20 people.

In Cuba, numerous palm trees were downed on Isla de la Juventud due to hurricane-force winds that struck the island. La Fe recorded 50 mph (80 km/h) winds and gusts up to 71 mph (114 km/h) on August 27. Many houses were also destroyed by strong winds and branches of trees were snapped in La Coloma, Pinar del Río. Los Palacios, and Consolación del Sur also lost electricity, according to a local newspaper in the province. Despite the hurricane, many hospital workers continued to work during the storm. Overall Ida caused $40 million in insurance loss and $100 million in damage in Cuba.

=== United States ===
Strongest landfalling Atlantic U.S. hurricanes^{†}
Rank	Name^{‡}	Season	Wind speed	
Rank	Name^{‡}	Season	mph	km/h
1	"Labor Day"	1935	185	295
2	Camille	1969	175	280
3	Andrew	1992	165	270
4	"San Felipe II"*	1928	160	260
4	Michael	2018	160	260
6	Maria	2017	155	250
7	"Last Island"	1856	150	240
7	"Indianola"	1886	150	240
7	"Florida Keys"	1919	150	240
7	"Freeport"	1932	150	240
7	Charley	2004	150	240
7	Laura	2020	150	240
7	Ida	2021	150	240
7	Ian	2022	150	240
Source: NHC, AOML/HRD
^{†}Strength refers to maximum sustained wind speed upon striking land.
^{‡}Systems prior to 1950 were not officially named.
*Name given to the storm at its peak landfall.

Impact by state
State	Total	Direct	Indirect	Damage
New Jersey	32	29	3	$8–10 billion
Louisiana	30	4	26	$55 billion
New York	18	17	1	$7.5–9 billion
Pennsylvania	5	5	0	$2.5–3.5 billion
Mississippi	2	2	0	—N/a
Alabama	2	0	2	—N/a
Maryland	2	2	0	—N/a
Connecticut	1	1	0	—N/a
Total	92	60	32	$73–77.5 billion

Extreme damage was recorded in Louisiana, with a very large number of houses being damaged or destroyed, and storm surge and rain causing widespread flooding and water damage. Power outages were extensive through the southeastern portion of the state. As Ida moved to the Northeastern United States, its remnants spawned several tornadoes, with some being damaging and powerful. Record rain and high-level flash flooding occurred through extensive portions of the Northeast. Ida was estimated to have caused at least $65 billion (2021 USD) in damages in the United States. Dozens of residents died, mostly in Louisiana, New Jersey and New York.

==== Louisiana ====
Hurricane Ida at landfall in Port Fourchon, Louisiana, on August 29; an outer eyewall can be seen surrounding the inner eyewall.

Severe damage was recorded across the coastal areas of Louisiana, including in New Orleans, Golden Meadow, Houma, Galliano, LaPlace, Lockport and Grand Isle. In Houma, whiteout conditions were recorded, with flying debris and many houses damaged or destroyed. Wireless services were knocked out temporarily. An urgent flood warning was issued for Braithwaite when one of the levees was overtopped. In Galliano, many homes were destroyed, trees were uprooted, cars overturned and power lines brought down. The Lady of the Sea General Hospital in Galliano was damaged, losing a significant amount of the roof.

Significant damage was recorded in the French Quarter in New Orleans, including destroyed roofs and building collapses. The historic Karnofsky Shop collapsed. All of New Orleans lost electricity, as well as a significant portion of Jefferson Parish, after a 400-foot tower owned by Entergy and Entergy New Orleans located near the Avondale Shipyard on the Westbank collapsed under its own weight. The collapse caused major damage to eight major feeder transmission lines when they fell into the Mississippi River. While power was restored to some neighborhoods 10 days after the "catastrophic failure", some neighborhoods waited significantly longer. The incident has prompted several investigations.

There were at least 10 deaths due to heat related factors directly related to the power outage within New Orleans, including noted photographer Laura Bergerol and several residents in senior housing apartment developments. Approximately one million people throughout the state were left without power. Two drowning deaths were reported, including a man who drowned in New Orleans after attempting to drive his vehicle through floodwater.

One of the ferries used on the Lower Algiers-Chalmette route across the Mississippi River broke free of its mooring during the hurricane, drifted up the river, and then ran aground. One of the sections of the Gulf Outlet Dam was overtopped by the storm surge. The USGS recorded the Mississippi River near Belle Chase flowing in reverse due to the volume of the surge. The St. Stephen Catholic School in New Orleans lost its roof.

After the storm had passed, nearly all of the oil production along the Gulf Coast was shut down. Thousands of emergency crew members were deployed in Louisiana, and hundreds of residents were rescued. Power outages in the most heavily affected areas were expected to last for up to a month. States of emergency were declared for Louisiana and portions of the Northeast. Several sporting events were also moved, delayed, or cancelled due to the storm.

An anemometer in Grand Isle recorded a gust of 148 mph (238 km/h) before being destroyed. In Prairieville, a man was killed when a tree fell on his home during the hurricane. An anemometer in Port Fourchon recorded a gust of 172 mph (277 km/h) when Ida came ashore.

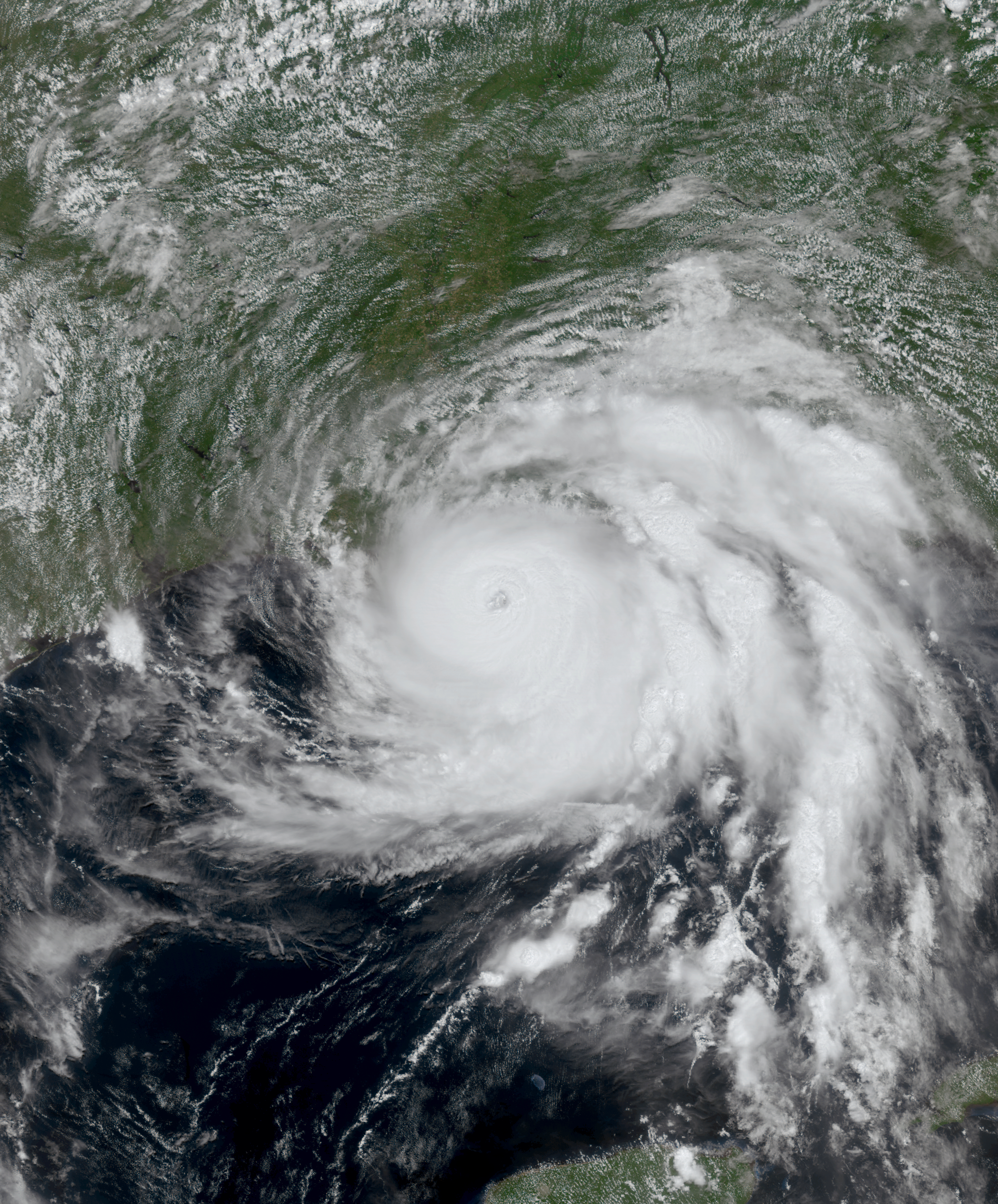
Hurricane Ida making landfall in Louisiana on August 29

Major damage was reported in Jefferson Parish. On August 30, insured damage was estimated to be at least $15 billion. Outside the post-Katrina flood protection system, eight feet (2.4 m) of water overtopped levees in lower Jefferson Parish forcing residents in Lafitte to flee to their rooftops to escape floodwaters. Entergy shut down the Waterford Nuclear Generating Station due to off-site electrical power being lost. Separate energy from emergency diesel generators was used to maintain safe shutdown conditions. The lowest level of alert, "unusual event", was issued. There were no reports of significant equipment damage. Two weak tornadoes, rated EF1 and EF0, struck Eden Isle just south of Slidell, Louisiana, damaging roofs, fences and trees. Two days later in Slidell itself, a 71-year-old man was presumed dead after being mauled by an alligator while walking through floodwaters near his home. On September 13, the alligator was captured and killed by state authorities. Human remains were recovered from inside the alligator's stomach.

Aerial photos and footage was released, which showed large-scale destruction, debris, and flooding throughout affected areas. On August 31, a 24-year-old man was found dead in Uptown New Orleans. The cause of death was assumed to be carbon monoxide (CO) poisoning. The next day, in the same city, 12 people, including 7 children, were hospitalized due to CO poisoning. Three additional CO poisoning deaths were reported on September 2 in Jefferson Parish. In nearby St. Tammany Parish, nine people were hospitalized from the same cause.

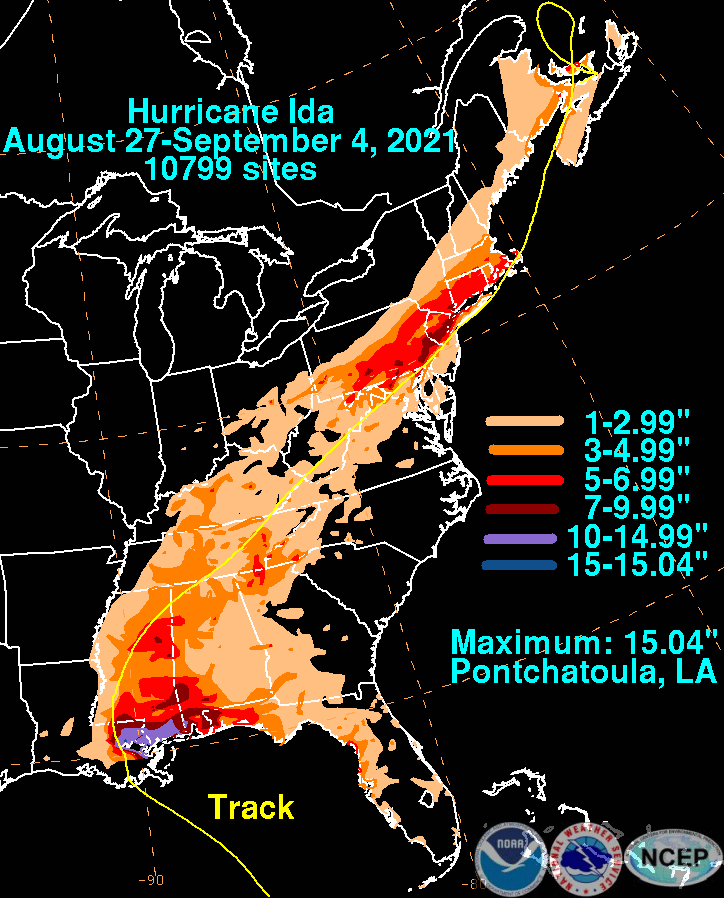
Rainfall totals in the US.

Much of Southeastern Louisiana was devastated by storm surge inundation, which was estimated to be over 6 feet (1.8 m) in many areas. Plaquemines Parish on the east bank of Mississippi River had an estimated storm surge value of at least 14 feet (4.3 m). Grand Isle, which was located just east of the landfall point of Ida, was struck by 10.2 feet (3.1 m) and was rendered uninhabitable after the storm. Up to 12 breaks in its sand levee led to 100% of structures being damaged, with 40% being completely destroyed, or being blocked by piles of debris, and electrical lines were toppled and buried. Parts of the island were covered by up to 3 feet (0.91 m) of sand. The police station was affected, with the roof being torn apart. The chief, Scooter Resweber, called it the "most severe hurricane" he had ever experienced. A St. James Parish man was killed after his backyard shed fell on top of him during Hurricane Ida's heavy winds. Four storm-related deaths were also reported in Tangipahoa Parish among nursing home residents evacuated during Hurricane Ida. As a result of power outages one person died in New Orleans due to heat exhaustion and another person died from a lack of oxygen in St. Tammany Parish. One person also died after falling from a roof while making damage repairs. Total damage to agriculture was estimated at up to $584 million.

On September 7, it was reported that 4 people had died and another 141 people had been hospitalized in the state of Louisiana, due to carbon monoxide poisoning following Ida. According to the Louisiana Department of Health, these deaths were caused by power generators being used indoors, amid power outages following the devastation of the hurricane. The recommendations for using the power generators are to place the generations at least 20 feet (6.1 m) away from homes, and for a carbon monoxide detector or alarm to be set up immediately.

A week after the storm, over a million people in southeast Louisiana were still without power. By the end of September 2021, approximately 90% of the state's power had been restored with the exception of heavily damaged grids from areas closest to the Gulf of Mexico. After the storm, fish kills due to hypoxia were reported across the state.

==== Mississippi ====
Over 113,000 people were without electricity on August 30. On August 31, three people were killed and at least nine others were injured when seven vehicles plunged into a deep hole in a collapsed section of MS 26 in George County. Heavy rains from Ida had caused the highway to collapse. 13 weak tornadoes touched down or moved ashore as waterspouts from August 29–30, affecting virtually the entire coastline. An EF1 tornado caused significant damage to homes and other structures near Pass Christian and Diamondhead. The other 12 tornadoes were rated EF0 with seven of them striking or moving between Gulfport and Biloxi, although the damage from them was minimal. This was thought to be in part due to Hurricane Zeta's impacts from the previous year; many weak and dead trees and substandard structures were removed in that storm, potentially reducing the amount of debris available for Ida to cause damage with. Another EF0 tornado struck Pascagoula causing minor damage to homes and tree limbs.

==== Alabama ====
Seven weak tornadoes touched down in the southern portion of the state. Three people were injured in Saraland by an EF1 tornado that ripped portions of roofs from motels and an industrial buildings and knocked down trees, some of which fell on homes. Another EF1 tornado damaged trees, rolled a mobile home, and tore most of the roof of another home southeast of Jackson. The other five tornadoes were rated EF0. Two electrical workers died in Adger while repairing power grid damage caused by the storm.

==== Northeast ====
===== Mid-Atlantic =====
Two EF1 tornadoes touched down in Montgomery County, Virginia on August 31. The first one damaged a barn and snapped or uprooted several trees southeast of Radford. The second one also snapped and uprooted trees and destroyed a swing northwest of Merrimac. In Buchanan County, one person was found dead after flooding from the storm. In Maryland, A 19-year-old man was confirmed dead after flooding at an apartment complex in Rockville. In Frederick County, 10 students and their bus driver had to be rescued when their school bus was caught in flooding. An EF2 tornado caused considerable damage to homes, businesses, schools, and other structures as well as trees, signs, and power lines in Annapolis. Two other EF0 tornadoes also touched down in the state. In Wilmington, Delaware, over 200 people were rescued from flooding caused by the storm along the Brandywine Creek. On September 1, a planned MLB baseball game between the Philadelphia Phillies and Washington Nationals was postponed due to the rain caused by the remnants of the storm.

====== Pennsylvania ======
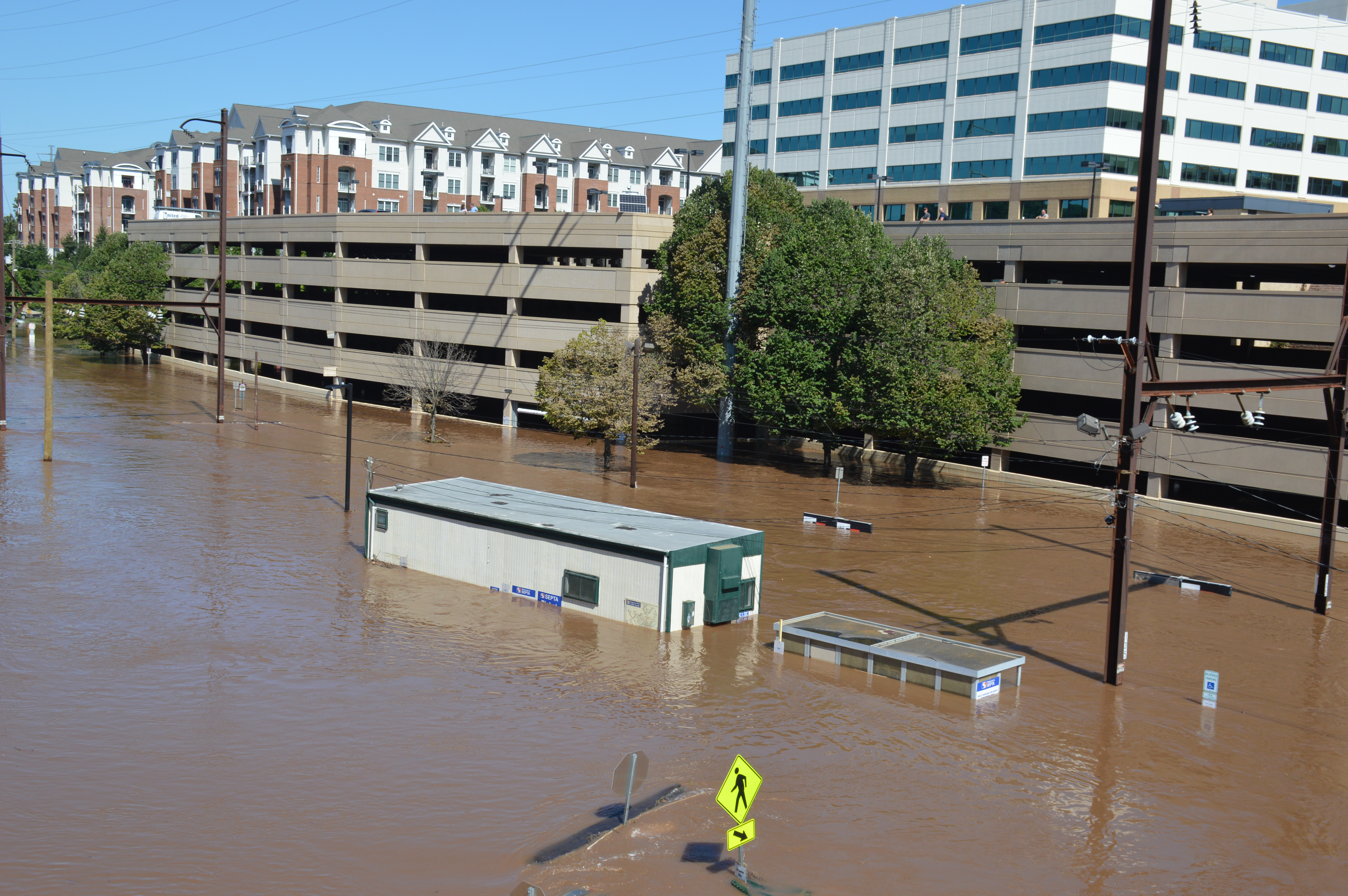
Flooding in Conshohocken, Pennsylvania on September 2, 2021

In Pennsylvania, an EF2 tornado caused damage in Fort Washington, Upper Dublin Township, and Horsham Township in Montgomery County, knocking down trees and power lines and tearing the roof off of the Upper Dublin Police Department. A woman was killed in Upper Dublin Township when the tornado blew a tree down onto her house. An EF1 tornado struck Buckingham Township in Bucks County, an EF1 tornado hit Upper Makefield Township in Bucks County, and an EF2 tornado touched down in Oxford in Chester County as well.

Heavy rain and extensive flooding occurred in Eastern Pennsylvania. The Schuylkill River flooded portions of Philadelphia, with Interstate 676 (Vine Street Expressway) partially covered in water. Flooding from the river also affected the Manayunk neighborhood of Philadelphia, with residents rescued from apartments along Main Street. In Milford Township, a man was found dead after he drowned in his vehicle in the Unami Creek. Flooding from the Schuylkill River caused damage to SEPTA Regional Rail's Manayunk/Norristown Line between Miquon and Norristown, resulting in the suspension of service. Service between Center City Philadelphia and Spring Mill resumed on September 7 while service along the entire length of the line to Norristown resumed on September 13. Overall, Ida caused up to $100 million in Southern Pennsylvania as a result.

====== New Jersey and New York ======
Radar reflectivity depicting the remnants of Ida producing severe weather and flash flooding in the Northeastern United States on September 1.

The impact of Ida in New Jersey and New York was unusually intense and deadly. Ida was the third tropical system in as many weeks to soak the Northeastern United States, after Fred and Henri, which left the soil saturated and a greater risk of flooding. Numerous flash flood warnings and flash flood emergencies were issued across the area as well. Tornado warnings were also issued in parts of the New York City Metropolitan Area, including Westchester County, New York, and parts of Fairfield and Ridgefield in Connecticut. The National Weather Service's New York City office issued its first ever flash flood emergency in response to severe flooding in northeastern New Jersey, followed an hour later by the first flash flood emergency ever for New York City itself.

An EF3 tornado destroyed multiple homes in Mullica Hill, New Jersey. The same storm produced an EF1 tornado that tracked from Edgewater Park, New Jersey, to Bristol, Pennsylvania, and prompted a rare tornado emergency for Bristol and Croydon, Pennsylvania, as well as Burlington, New Jersey. The same storm also produced an EF0 tornado that caused tree damage in Princeton, New Jersey. Portions of Trenton, New Jersey, were evacuated due to flooding caused by the storm. At least 27 people died in New Jersey, including one person who drowned inside their car in Passaic, New Jersey, and five others who died in their apartment complex in Elizabeth, New Jersey. Over 81,740 power outages were reported on the night of September 1 in New Jersey. In Hunterdon County rain fall topped 11 inches Six people were killed and 300 plus people were rescued from the flood waters. New Jersey Task Force One and the Burlington County OEM responded to assist local agencies with over 300 water rescues. One victim's truck was swept 1.8 miles down stream in Milford, NJ.

Widespread flooding shut down much of the New York City Subway system as well as large portions of the NJ Transit, Long Island Rail Road, and Metro-North Railroad commuter rail systems and Amtrak intercity services. A tennis match at the 2021 U.S. Open was delayed when strong winds and rain came through the spaces of the naturally ventilated roof of Louis Armstrong Stadium. Eighteen storm-related deaths were also reported in New York. Most people who died in New York City, including a family of three in Woodside, Queens, lived in basement apartments that flooded. Overall, Ida wrought $8–10 billion in damage across New Jersey and $7.5–9 billion in New York. Over 4,700 property damage claims were filed against New York City. Claimants argued that it was the city's negligence of its sewer system, which led to wide spread flooding. The New York City Comptroller's office denied all claims, based on a 1907 legal decision that does not hold municipal governments responsible for damage due to “extraordinary or excessive” rainfall.

===== New England =====
Up to 9 in (230 mm) of rain fell over parts of Connecticut, resulting in widespread flooding. A Connecticut state trooper died after he and his police cruiser were swept away by floodwaters from the Pomperaug River in Woodbury. Similar rainfall total were recorded in neighboring Rhode Island, and rivers in the state rose towards moderate flood stage. In southeastern Massachusetts, New Bedford received 9.5 in (240 mm) of rain and an EF0 tornado touched down at Dennis, on Cape Cod.

=== Atlantic Canada ===
Heavy rain from Ida's remnants inundated Canada's Maritime provinces on September 2, and several power outages were reported. Brier Island, in the Bay of Fundy, just off the coast of Nova Scotia received 4.8 in (121 mm) of rain. Wind gusts reached 53 mph (85 km/h) at Lunenburg, Nova Scotia. Environment Canada reported that 5.07 in (128.8 mm) of rain fell in Charlottetown, Prince Edward Island. More rain fell in just 24 hours throughout the province than in any average month. Wind gusts in and around the Northumberland Strait reached as high as 62 mph (100 km/h).

In Quebec, 3.9 in (100 mm) of rain fell on the Magdalen Islands on September 3, washing out various sections of road, especially near L'Étang-du-Nord and in the Havre-Aubert sectors. The schools suspended their classes for September 3. Elsewhere, 2.0–3.9 in (50–100 mm) of rain fell across the Gaspé Peninsula, Anticosti Island and the Lower North Shore, according to the Meteorological Service of Canada. The rains caused flooding, forced the evacuation of several houses and a retirement home, as well as road closures, in the Grande-Vallée to Rivière-au-Renard region of the Gaspé where the accumulations exceeded 3.9 in (100 mm). In addition, winds reached 50–68 mph (80–110 km/h) in these regions causing a strong storm surge.

In Newfoundland and Labrador, 1.2–2.4 in (30–60 mm) of rain fell over central and western parts of Newfoundland, with 2.63 in (66.8 mm) recorded at the La Scie station (near Baie Verte). Winds reached 68 mph (110 km/h) in Wreckhouse and 55 mph (88 km/h) in Stephenville in the southwest.

== Aftermath ==
=== United States ===
Costliest U.S. Atlantic hurricanes (Note: The storm category color indicates the intensity of the hurricane when landfalling in the U.S.)
Rank	Hurricane	Season	Damage
1	3 Katrina	2005	$125 billion
1	4 Harvey	2017	$125 billion
3	4 Ian	2022	$112 billion
4	4 Maria	2017	$90 billion
5	4 Helene	2024	$78.7 billion
6	4 Ida	2021	$75 billion
7	ET Sandy	2012	$65 billion
8	4 Irma	2017	$52.1 billion
9	3 Milton	2024	$34.3 billion
10	2 Ike	2008	$30 billion

The storm shut down nearly all Gulf Coast oil production, accounting for about 15% of the U.S. total. Louisiana's mainland refineries were also shut down, which account for 12.5% of the nation's capacity. The Colonial Pipeline was partially shut down as a result of the hurricane. This combination of factors caused prices to rise for oil and gasoline products across the United States. Early estimates of insured losses were from $15 billion to $25 billion. The offshore and onshore of the Gulf Region is up to $35 billion in Insured loss.

==== Louisiana ====
Recovering from the massive blackout in New Orleans was originally estimated to take weeks but most power was restored within 10 days by repairing a transmission line from Slidell and bringing the New Orleans Power Station online in tandem. The Massachusetts Task Force sent an 80-member team to Baton Rouge to help with the impacts of Ida on August 29. The team was composed of emergency medical technicians, doctors, structure, communication and logistics specialists, and emergency room technicians, among others. People in lower-income communities affected by Ida had trouble affording to leave. States such as Texas and South Carolina and national non-profits also gathered donations to distribute to victims and to help in the search and rescue operations.

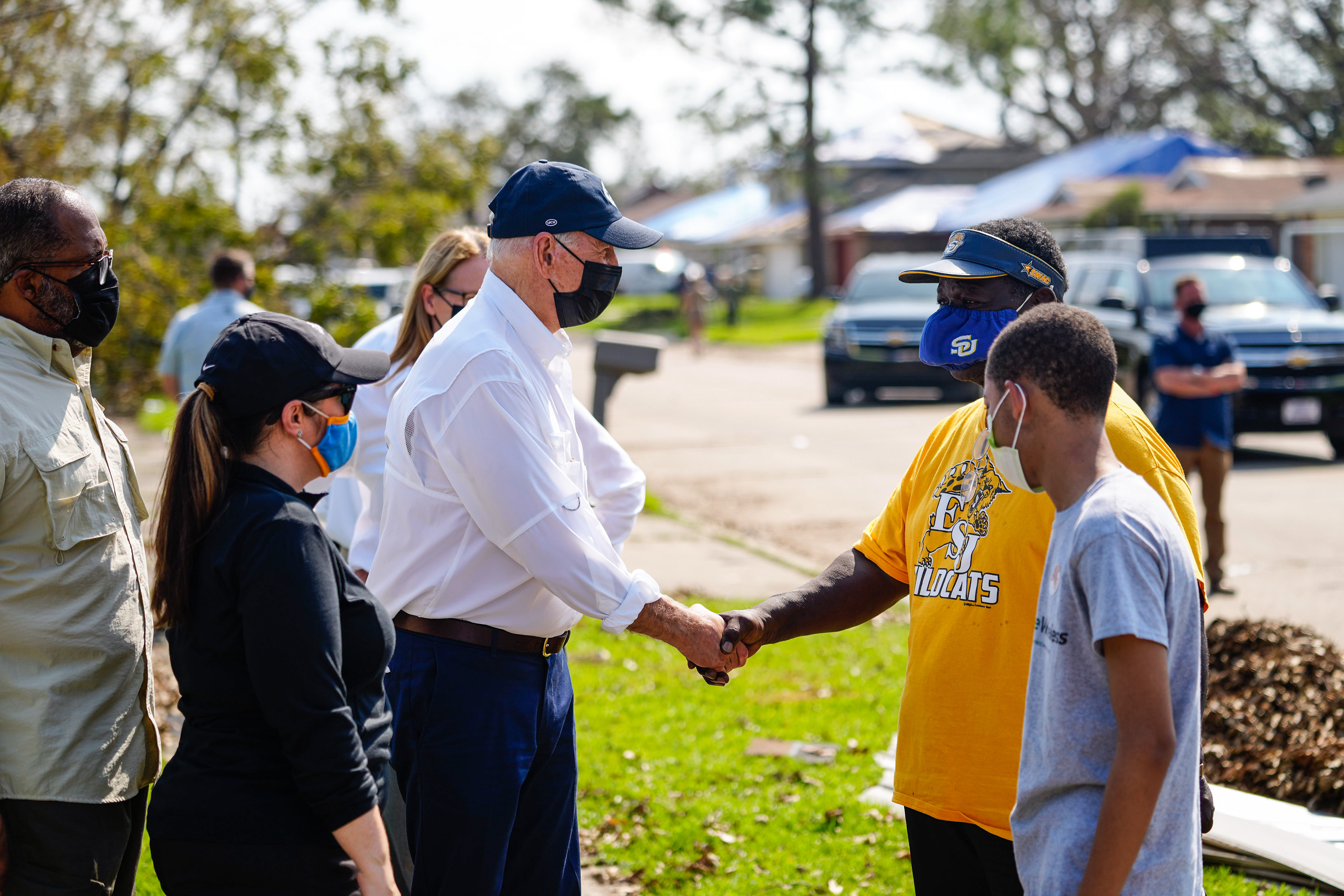
U.S. President Joe Biden meets with residents of LaPlace, Louisiana on September 3

Over 5,000 national guard members were deployed, and more than 25,000 workers nationwide came in support of recovery efforts. U.S. President Joe Biden declared a major disaster in the state, which allowed for extra funding and recovery. Sweltering weather conditions following Ida worsened the living quality of many surviving residents without power and food. More than 2 million were placed under heat advisories after Ida passed. Officials said that power may not be restored to some for up to a month, a delay that could be life-threatening because of intense heat.

The Louisiana National Guard activated 4,900 guard personnel, and dispatched about 200 high-water vehicles, along with more than 70 rescue boats and 30 helicopters. By the afternoon of August 30, 191 people and 27 pets were rescued after crews checked 400 homes. Governor John Bel Edwards said the damage was "catastrophic" and that officials believe the death toll "could rise considerably". Tulane University announced plans to evacuate its campus of all remaining students and to take them to Houston. Many people fled to stores to get food and water, and to gas stations to get fuel. John Bel Edwards said in a preliminary survey of the state's levees that they worked as intended and held water out.

On August 30, it was announced that the college football game between Tulane and Oklahoma scheduled for September 4 was being moved from New Orleans to Norman, Oklahoma, although Tulane would still be considered the home team. On September 3, Tulane's second home game against Morgan State scheduled for September 11 was moved to Legion Field in Birmingham, Alabama. Tulane volleyball's tournament scheduled for September 17–18 against UAB, Sam Houston and Texas Tech was also moved to Birmingham with inside UAB's Bartow Arena. All fans were allowed to attend the two events free of charge. On August 31, the New Orleans Saints announced they were planning to use an interim facility in the Dallas-Fort Worth area for the first four weeks of the 2021 NFL season. The next day, their season opener against the Green Bay Packers on September 12 was moved to TIAA Bank Field in Jacksonville, Florida.

After being shut down for almost two years, Grand Isle State Park reopened on June 1, 2023.

==== Northeast ====
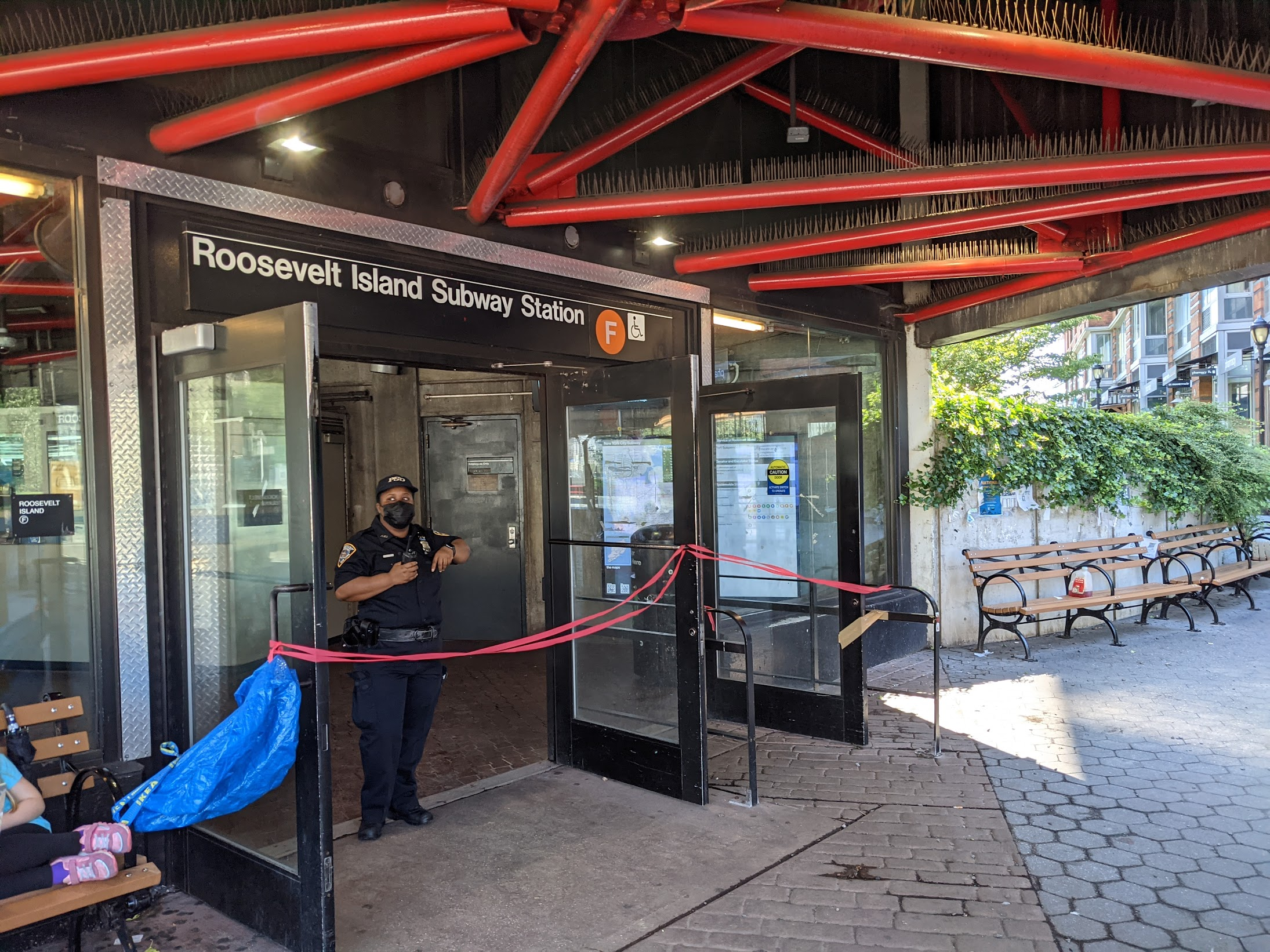
The remnants of Hurricane Ida inundated many New York City Subway tunnels, shutting down much of the Metropolitan Transportation Authority system.

States of emergency were declared in New York, including in New York City, as well as in New Jersey by governors Kathy Hochul and Phil Murphy. Several New Jersey public school districts delayed or cancelled classes because of flooding or severe weather damage. Newark Liberty International Airport suffered flooding in the terminals, and all departures were grounded. Operations continued the following morning, with flight delays and cancellations. On September 2, it was announced that due to the major flooding around SHI Stadium, the college football opening game between Rutgers and Temple scheduled for that day would be postponed to September 4. Connecticut Governor Ned Lamont also declared a State of Emergency for the entire state following widespread flooding.

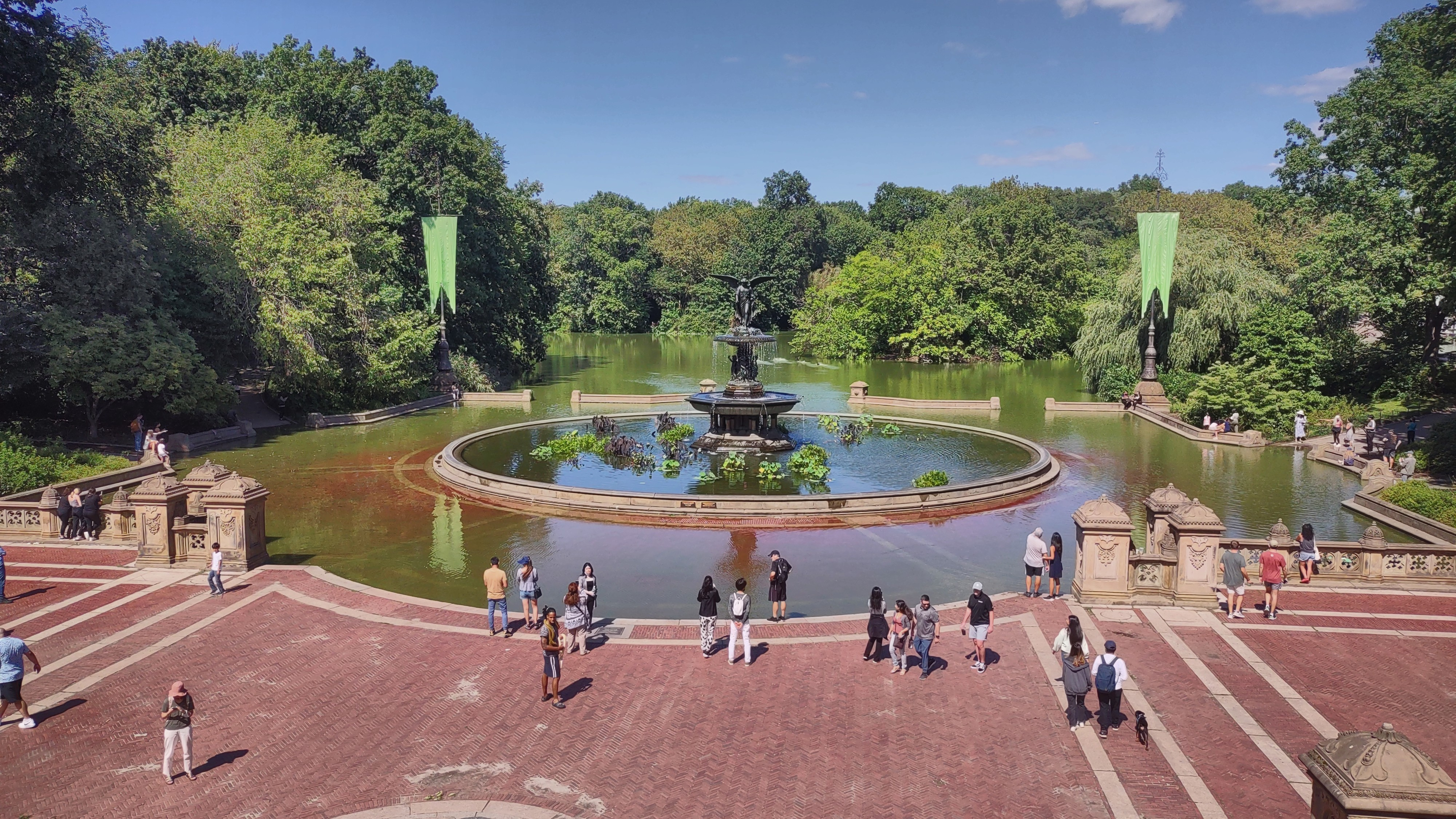
Bethesda Terrace after the flooding had mostly receded

Many rescue crews were sent in boats through flooded streets the day after the storm in Philadelphia, northern Delaware, and portions of New York state. Thousands of rescues had happened in Pennsylvania alone that day, and first responders helped bring communities to safety from halted subway trains the night of the flooding in New York City. Some were stranded overnight. The city also saw its share of hundreds of rescues the next day.

Major flooding caused several homes and businesses in Manville, New Jersey to catch fire. They burned for hours after exploding from utility damage. Fire crews were unable to reach them due to the high flood waters. Manville was said to have the worst flooding in the entire state. Other notable flooding in the state occurred in Woodbridge Township, Carteret, Rahway, Perth Amboy, Newark, Jersey City, and Paterson.

President Joe Biden commented on the flooding rains from the storms remnants, stating that New York recorded more rain Wednesday than "it usually sees the entire month of September". Mayor Bill de Blasio of New York City said Ida was "unlike anything we've seen before". Most of the city's deaths were in Queens. Rainfall in Central Park broke a 94-year record, while Newark, New Jersey, broke a 62-year record. Estimated damages are $16–24 billion from the northeast.

=== Retirement ===
Due to the extreme damage and number of deaths the hurricane caused across a large section of the United States, the World Meteorological Organization retired the name Ida from its rotating name lists in April 2022, and it will never be used again for another Atlantic tropical cyclone. It was replaced with Imani, which will first appear on the 2027 season list.

== See also ==
- Weather of 2021
- Tropical cyclones in 2021
- List of Category 4 Atlantic hurricanes
