= Jones Town =

Jones Town may refer to:

- Jones Town, an area within the city of Kingston, Jamaica
- Jones Town, a settlement in West Grand Bahama

See also:

- Jonestown (disambiguation)
