= Saint Johnstown =

Saint (or St) Johnstown, Johnstoun, Johnston or Johnstone may refer to:

== Ireland ==
- St Johnston, County Donegal, a village
  - St Johnstown (County Donegal) (Parliament of Ireland constituency)
- Saint Johnstown or Ballinalee, County Longford, a village
  - St Johnstown (County Longford) (Parliament of Ireland constituency)

== Scotland ==
- Perth, Scotland, originally known as Saint John's Toun or St Johnstone
  - St Johnstone F.C., a football club based in Perth

== United States ==
- Saint Johnstown, Delaware, a stop on the now defunct Queen Anne's Railroad line between Ellendale and Greenwood

== See also ==
- Johnston (disambiguation)
- Johnstown (disambiguation)
- Saint John (disambiguation)
- Saint John's (disambiguation)
