= Hurricane Ida tornado outbreak =

2021 tornado outbreak

- The remnants of Ida producing severe weather and flash flooding in the Northeastern United States on September 1, 2021

Meteorological history
- Formed: August 29, 2021
- Dissipated: September 2, 2021

Tornado outbreak
- Tornadoes: 36
- Max. rating: EF3 tornado
- Duration: 79 hours, 15 minutes
- Highest winds: 150 mph (240 km/h); EF3 tornado in Mullica Hill, New Jersey

Overall effects
- Fatalities: 1
- Injuries: 7
- Damage: >$72.098 million (2021 USD)
- Areas affected: Southeastern United States and Northeastern United States
- Part of the tornado outbreaks of 2021 and Hurricane Ida

Hurricane Ida generated a tornado outbreak as it traversed the Southeastern, Mid-Atlantic, and Northeastern United States. Thirty-six confirmed tornadoes touched down from Mississippi to Massachusetts; one person was killed in Upper Dublin Township, Pennsylvania, and several people were injured in Alabama, New Jersey, and Pennsylvania. The most active and destructive part of the outbreak occurred during the afternoon of September 1, when several strong tornadoes struck Maryland, New Jersey, and Pennsylvania, including an EF3 tornado which impacted Mullica Hill, New Jersey. The same storm later dropped an EF1 tornado that prompted a tornado emergency for Burlington, New Jersey and Croydon, and Bristol, Pennsylvania, the first of its kind in the Northeast, as well as the first such alert associated with a tropical cyclone or its remnants. This outbreak severely impacted New Jersey and the Philadelphia Metropolitan Area, a region which had been significantly impacted by strong tornadoes from another outbreak that occurred just over a month prior, as well as several weak tornadoes from the remnants of Tropical Storm Fred two weeks earlier. Overall, the 36 tornadoes killed one person and injured seven others.

== Meteorological synopsis ==
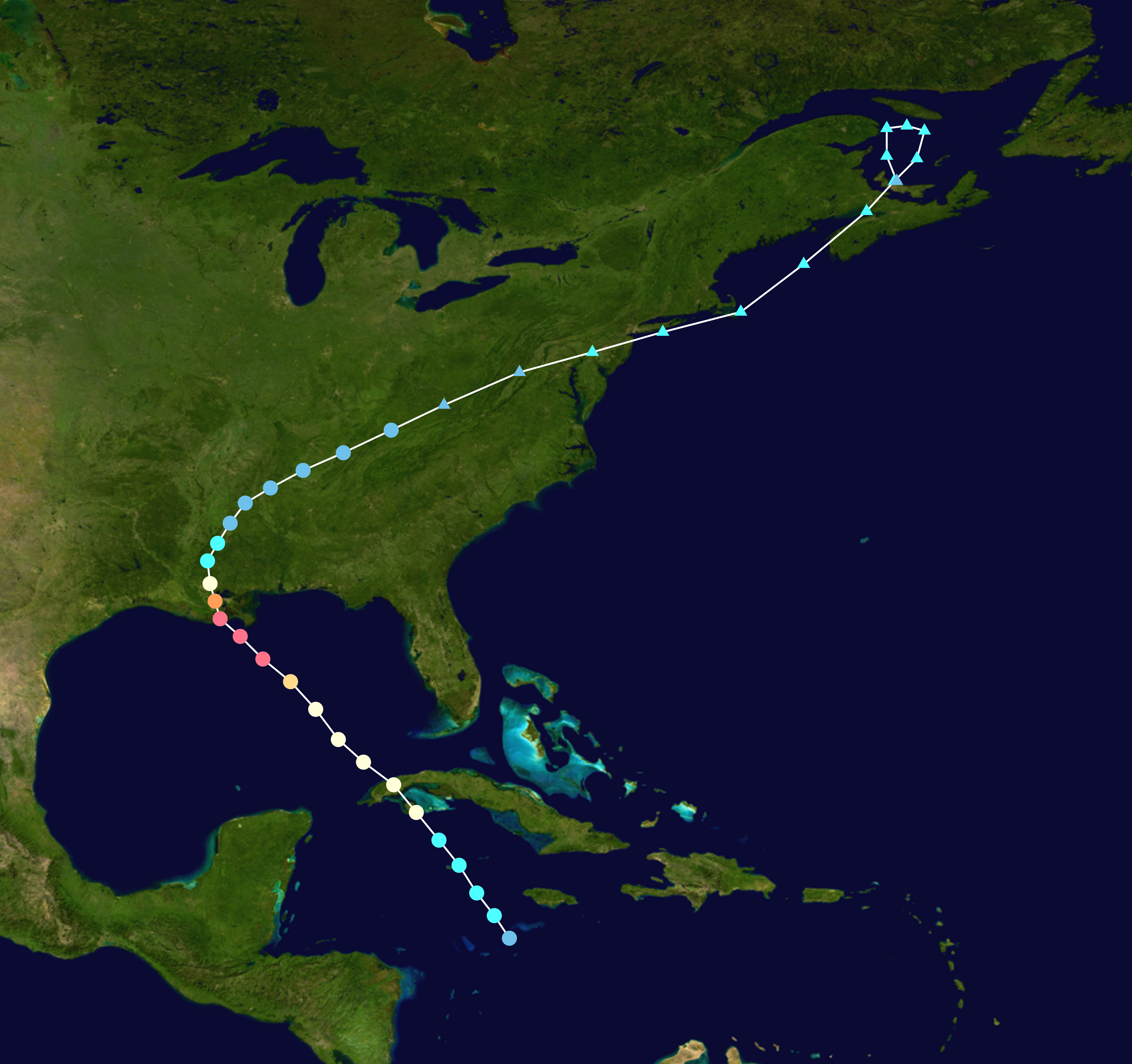
Map plotting the storm's track and intensity, according to the Saffir–Simpson scale Map key Saffir–Simpson scale Tropical depression (≤38 mph, ≤62 km/h) Tropical storm (39–73 mph, 63–118 km/h) Category 1 (74–95 mph, 119–153 km/h) Category 2 (96–110 mph, 154–177 km/h) Category 3 (111–129 mph, 178–208 km/h) Category 4 (130–156 mph, 209–251 km/h) Category 5 (≥157 mph, ≥252 km/h) Unknown Storm type Tropical cyclone Subtropical cyclone Extratropical cyclone, remnant low, tropical disturbance, or monsoon depression

At 16:55 UTC on August 29, Hurricane Ida made landfall near Port Fourchon, Louisiana, with sustained winds of 150 mph (240 km/h) and a central pressure of 930 mbar (27 inHg). Strong low-level shear, daytime boundary heating, and weak inland buoyancy led to an increasing risk for tornadoes across the Southeastern United States. The Storm Prediction Center (SPC) issued a slight risk for severe weather for the Central Gulf Coast for three straight days between August 29-31. Numerous weak tornadoes touched down in Mississippi, Louisiana, and Alabama during this time. One EF1 tornado caused considerable damage in Saraland, Alabama on August 30, injuring three people. A small slight risk was also issued in the Mid-Atlantic for the Southern Delmarva Peninsula on August 31, where a confluence zone was expected to have an increasing westerly mid-level flow in response to Ida, although it was not the only influence in this area. Two weak tornadoes occurred in Southwest Virginia that afternoon.

As Ida became extratropical and moved into the Northeastern United States on September 1, a strengthening low-level jet (LLJ) along and south of a warm front coupled with a very moist atmosphere and sufficient surface heating led to a more substantial risk for tornadoes between Washington, D.C., and New York City and the SPC issued a tornado-driven enhanced risk for severe weather for this region. This included a 10% tornado risk with a 30% damaging wind risk added later on. That afternoon, several supercells formed across the D.C. metropolitan area and quickly became tornadic as they moved northeast. An EF2 tornado struck Annapolis, Maryland, causing significant structural and tree damage throughout the city. Another EF2 tornado caused severe damage in a residential neighborhood in Oxford, Pennsylvania. Later, a large EF2 tornado struck Upper Dublin Township, Pennsylvania, severely damaging buildings, homes, and trees, killing one person and causing a few minor injuries. An intense EF3 wedge tornado destroyed several homes and a dairy farm in Mullica Hill, New Jersey as well, injuring two people. An EF1 tornado produced by the same storm prompted the issuance of the first ever tornado emergency the Northeast, as well as the first such alert associated with a tropical cyclone. A few other weak tornadoes also touched down later that evening and into September 2 before the remnants of Ida moved offshore, ending the outbreak.

== Confirmed tornadoes ==
Confirmed tornadoes by Enhanced Fujita rating
EFU	EF0	EF1	EF2	EF3	EF4	EF5	Total
0	22	10	3	1	0	0	36

=== August 29 event ===
List of confirmed tornadoes – Sunday, August 29, 2021 (Note: All dates are based on the local time zone where the tornado touched down; however, all times are in Coordinated Universal Time for consistency.)
EF#	Location	County / Parish	State	Start Coord.	Time (UTC)	Path length	Max width
EF1	WSW of Pass Christian to SW of Diamondhead	Harrison, Hancock	MS	30.3156°N 89.2582°W	11:23–11:28	3.8 mi (6.1 km)	150 yd (140 m)
EF1	A waterspout moved onshore from the Gulf of Mexico damaging several homes, with one sustaining extensive roof damage. It continued to damage homes as it tracked northwest into the Bay of St. Louis. The tornado tracked near Diamondhead as it moved onshore from the bay. Shingles were removed from the roof of a nursing center as the tornado crossed I-10 before dissipating shortly thereafter. Trees were snapped or uprooted along the path as well.						
EF0	Gulfport	Harrison	MS	30.3777°N 89.0646°W	22:15–22:19	0.74 mi (1.19 km)	50 yd (46 m)
EF0	Numerous trees and tree limbs were downed, including one large tree that was uprooted onto two houses. A house, a strip mall, and another building sustained roof damage as well.						
EF1	Eden Isle (1st tornado)	St. Tammany	LA	30.2112°N 89.7729°W	23:33–23:38	4.92 mi (7.92 km)	175 yd (160 m)
EF1	Two buildings at a condominium complex had their roofs partially torn off. Numerous houses were damaged and trees were downed.						
EF0	SE to NW of Pearlington	Hancock	MS	30.2061°N 89.5074°W	23:59–00:09	10.55 mi (16.98 km)	75 yd (69 m)
EF0	A waterspout moved onshore, blowing down road signs and posts. Trees and roofs of homes were damaged.						
EF0	Eden Isle (2nd tornado)	St. Tammany	LA	30.2197°N 89.7942°W	01:56–01:57	0.88 mi (1.42 km)	100 yd (91 m)
EF0	A brief tornado damage roofs and fences and uprooted trees.						
EF0	ESE of Waveland to Shoreline Park	Hancock	MS	30.2664°N 89.3864°W	03:11–03:14	3.34 mi (5.38 km)	200 yd (180 m)
EF0	A waterspout moved onshore and caused minor damage to the roofs of several homes and an apartment complex. Several trees were also snapped or uprooted.						
EF0	NE of Waveland to NE of Shoreline Park	Hancock	MS	30.2955°N 89.3658°W	03:15–03:18	2.88 mi (4.63 km)	200 yd (180 m)
EF0	A waterspout moved onshore, where the roofs of several homes sustained minor damage. Several trees were snapped or uprooted as well.						
EF0	Henderson Point	Harrison	MS	30.3081°N 89.2822°W	03:37–03:38	0.51 mi (0.82 km)	75 yd (69 m)
EF0	A waterspout formed over the Mississippi Sound and moved inland. Several homes and a detached garage were damaged, trees were snapped or uprooted, and power lines were snapped.						

=== August 30 event ===
List of confirmed tornadoes – Monday, August 30, 2021
EF#	Location	County / Parish	State	Start Coord.	Time (UTC)	Path length	Max width
EF0	Biloxi (1st tornado)	Harrison	MS	30.3973°N 88.9332°W	09:18–09:19	0.17 mi (0.27 km)	150 yd (140 m)
EF0	A very brief tornado caused minor damage to several homes and several apartment buildings.						
EF0	Biloxi (2nd tornado)	Harrison	MS	30.3966°N 88.8788°W	10:55–10:56	0.53 mi (0.85 km)	100 yd (91 m)
EF0	A brief tornado inflicted minor damage to several homes and a small office complex. Large tree limbs were snapped.						
EF0	NW of Mississippi City	Harrison	MS	30.3868°N 89.0565°W	12:44–12:45	0.52 mi (0.84 km)	100 yd (91 m)
EF0	A brief tornado damaged the roofs of several homes and snapped numerous trees.						
EF0	E of Gulfport to WSW of Biloxi	Harrison	MS	30.391°N 89.0061°W	12:49–12:51	1.04 mi (1.67 km)	200 yd (180 m)
EF0	Trees were snapped and uprooted at a golf club. Several homes sustained damage, and a warehouse lost some of its roof panels.						
EF0	Biloxi (3rd tornado)	Harrison	MS	30.3971°N 88.9928°W	12:50–12:55	3.47 mi (5.58 km)	125 yd (114 m)
EF0	Trees were downed and several houses sustained roof damage. The tornado crossed Big Lake and caused minor damage more homes.						
EF0	Biloxi (4th tornado)	Harrison	MS	30.3974°N 88.9737°W	12:56–12:58	1.05 mi (1.69 km)	150 yd (140 m)
EF0	Several homes sustained minor roof damage. Portions of roofing were torn off at a bank and a restaurant, and trees and fences were damaged along the tornado's path.						
EF0	Pascagoula to SE of Helena	Jackson	MS	30.3499°N 88.5583°W	14:37–14:57	10.19 mi (16.40 km)	50 yd (46 m)
EF0	A waterspout moved ashore, causing light damage to multiple homes. Tree limbs were damaged.						
EF1	Saraland to E of Bucks	Mobile, Baldwin	AL	30.7951°N 88.0731°W	17:20–17:43	16.62 mi (26.75 km)	175 yd (160 m)
EF1	The roof of a motel was partially removed just west of US 43 in Saraland, and several sections of another motel's roof were removed. The roof of an industrial building was partially removed and an 18-wheeler was overturned. Trees were uprooted or snapped along the path, including some that fell onto a home near I-65. Three people were injured. In November 2023, this tornado was reanalyzed and had its path length adjusted from 9.96 mi (16.03 km) to 16.62 mi (26.75 km) due to a narrow swath of uprooted and snapped trees noted on Planet and Worldview satellite imagery. The ending point was also extended further to the northeast into the Mobile River delta.						
EF1	E of Malcolm	Clarke, Baldwin	AL	31.21°N 87.86°W	18:05–18:10	3.53 mi (5.68 km)	175 yd (160 m)
EF1	In November 2023, a new tornado was found along the Alabama River based on a narrow swath of tree damage noted on Planet and Worldview satellite imagery.						
EF1	ESE of Rockville to WSW of Alma	Clarke	AL	31.4064°N 87.7922°W	18:25–18:28	3.5 mi (5.6 km)	150 yd (140 m)
EF1	A mobile home was rolled and another home lost much of its roof. Trees were snapped or uprooted as the tornado tracked through a heavily wooded area.						
EF0	SE of Troy	Pike	AL	31.7266°N 85.9109°W	19:02–19:09	3.18 mi (5.12 km)	75 yd (69 m)
EF0	A few trees were downed or had limbs snapped off.						
EF0	SE of Tuskegee	Macon	AL	32.3979°N 85.5981°W	20:45–20:46	0.48 mi (0.77 km)	75 yd (69 m)
EF0	Trees and tree limbs were blown down, and a home sustained siding damage.						

=== August 31 event ===
List of confirmed tornadoes – Tuesday, August 31, 2021
EF#	Location	County / Parish	State	Start Coord.	Time (UTC)	Path length	Max width
EF0	SW of Peterman to Jones Crossroads	Houston	AL	31.1999°N 85.4894°W	20:59–21:08	0.89 mi (1.43 km)	20 yd (18 m)
EF0	Trees were downed onto a mobile home. Farther along the path, the doors and siding of a warehouse were damaged and the roof of a shed was peeled off.						
EF1	SE of Radford	Montgomery	VA	37.0808°N 80.5188°W	22:34–22:38	1.9 mi (3.1 km)	75 yd (69 m)
EF1	A barn was damaged and several trees were snapped or uprooted.						
EF1	NW of Merrimac	Montgomery	VA	37.1974°N 80.4376°W	22:59–23:00	0.22 mi (0.35 km)	75 yd (69 m)
EF1	Several trees were uprooted and snapped, and a swing was destroyed.						
EF0	Midland City	Dale	AL	31.3194°N 85.5045°W	23:14–23:17	0.65 mi (1.05 km)	125 yd (114 m)
EF0	Bleachers and a dugout at the Dale City High School were damaged. Numerous homes in Midland City sustained minor roof damage, and trampolines were lofted into the air. Several trees were also blown down, some of which fell onto and damaged a home.						
EF0	N of Bailey Crossroad	Geneva, Houston	AL	31.1884°N 85.614°W	23:34–23:40	2.29 mi (3.69 km)	25 yd (23 m)
EF0	This tornado moved through open fields before damaging a barn near the end of its path.						

=== September 1 event ===
List of confirmed tornadoes – Wednesday, September 1, 2021
EF#	Location	County / Parish	State	Start Coord.	Time (UTC)	Path length	Max width
EF2	Owensville to western Annapolis	Anne Arundel	MD	38.85°N 76.596°W	18:01–18:23	11.43 mi (18.39 km)	200 yd (180 m)
EF2	This damaging tornado first touched down in Owensville before moving north-northeastward, downing trees and tree branches. As it entered the south side of Edgewater, it strengthened and struck a subdivision, where multiple homes had large sections of their roofs torn off, and one was unroofed entirely. The Center of Applied Technology South and South River High School both sustained roof damage, while the concession stand and football field grandstands were also damaged. Many homes suffered considerable roof, siding, and porch damage as the tornado moved farther north-northeast through residential areas. After crossing the South River, the tornado reached peak strength and struck several neighborhoods in Annapolis. Numerous homes, apartment buildings, businesses, warehouses, and restaurants had their roofs ripped off or sustained significant roof and siding damage, including a warehouse that sustained some collapse of exterior walls. Numerous windows were also shattered, signs were destroyed, and many power lines and trees were downed, some of which landed on homes. The tornado weakened and caused additional tree and roof damage as it approached US 301/US 50 before lifting just after crossing it.						
EF0	E of Edgemere	Baltimore	MD	39.197°N 76.442°W	18:48–19:00	6.73 mi (10.83 km)	75 yd (69 m)
EF0	A high-end EF0 tornado developed at the confluence of the Patapsco River and Chesapeake Bay and moved north-northeastward, crossing the Shallow Creek, Back River, and Browns Creek. Trees and branches were snapped along the path before it dissipated near the Middle River.						
EF2	Eastern Oxford to NE of Russellville	Chester	PA	39.77°N 75.97°W	20:15–20:22	5.92 mi (9.53 km)	350 yd (320 m)
EF2	This low-end EF2 tornado first caused significant damage in the Wiltshire subdivision at the east edge of Oxford. A home lost an exterior wall, another home lost a large part of its roof and much of its siding, and several other homes were damaged to a lesser degree. An outbuilding was damaged and an RV was flipped at a business near the subdivision as well. The tornado weakened as it continued to the north, damaging a metal storage building, turkey pens, outbuildings, power poles, trees, and crops before dissipating. Damage totaled $500,000.						
EF0	W of Hurlock	Dorchester	MD	38.67°N 75.86°W	20:45–20:58	3.82 mi (6.15 km)	50 yd (46 m)
EF0	A 40 ft (12 m) section of roofing was torn off of a metal building. Several large irrigation systems were flipped, and damage to soybean and corn crops also occurred.						
EF2	Fort Washington to Horsham	Montgomery	PA	40.107°N 75.238°W	21:35–21:49	8.28 mi (13.33 km)	400 yd (370 m)
EF2	1 death – This rain-wrapped, strong tornado touched down near the Philadelphia Cricket Club southwest of Whitemarsh, where minor low-end EF1 tree damage occurred. Additional minor damage occurred to homes and trees in and around Fort Washington State Park. The tornado strengthened to high-end EF1 intensity as it moved through Whitemarsh, crossed the Pennsylvania Turnpike, and moved into a more residential area as it entered Fort Washington, where many trees were snapped, and numerous homes sustained minor to moderate roof and siding damage. The tornado then rapidly intensified and reached its peak intensity of high-end EF2 as it crossed PA 309 in Upper Dublin. Numerous homes and apartment buildings sustained partial to total loss of their roofs, and one sustained collapse of some exterior walls. Almost all trees in this area were uprooted or snapped, and cars were flipped or damaged by flying debris. Upper Dublin High School sustained roof damage, a large building adjacent to the school lost a significant portion of its roof, and power poles were snapped. Homes near the school were damaged, and one woman was killed when a large tree fell onto her house on Kenyon Drive. The tornado weakened to high-end EF1 strength as it continued to move to the northeast, flattening a wide swath of trees in a wooded area and causing severe roof damage to buildings on the campus of Temple University Ambler. Homes were damaged in a nearby neighborhood as well, a few of which also had large sections of roofing torn off. Many additional trees were downed, and mostly minor roof damage to homes, commercial buildings, and a veterinary hospital occurred in Maple Glen before the tornado quickly dissipated near the Bucks County line. Damage totaled $5 million and two people were injured.						
EF1	S of Doylestown to Buckingham Township	Bucks	PA	40.27°N 75.11°W	21:59–22:06	4.31 mi (6.94 km)	300 yd (270 m)
EF1	This tornado came from the same storm that produced the previous tornado above. It moved through a forested area, damaging and knocking down trees, some of which blocked roads.						
EF3	E of Harrisonville to Mullica Hill to Deptford	Gloucester	NJ	39.6769°N 75.2500°W	22:10–22:30	12.37 mi (19.91 km)	400 yd (370 m)
EF3	See section for this tornado – Two people were injured.						
EF1	Upper Makefield Township	Bucks	PA	40.298°N 74.938°W	22:30–22:35	1.6 mi (2.6 km)	250 yd (230 m)
EF1	Some trees were uprooted at the Jericho National Golf Club. Additional tree damage was found along with several flipped soccer goals at Brownsburg Park. The tornado dissipated just before crossing the Delaware River.						
EF1	Edgewater Park, NJ to Bristol, PA	Burlington (NJ), Bucks (PA)	NJ, PA	40.06°N 74.89°W	22:59–23:04	2.98 mi (4.80 km)	200 yd (180 m)
EF1	This tornado came from the same storm that produced the Mullica Hill EF3 tornado. Trees and power lines were damaged along the path and a few homes sustained minor damage. Several pictures and videos were taken, particularly as the tornado crossed the Delaware River between Burlington and Bristol. A tornado emergency was issued for this tornado, the first of its kind to be issued in the Northeast.						
EF0	Princeton	Mercer	NJ	40.31°N 74.67°W	23:32–23:35	2.61 mi (4.20 km)	100 yd (91 m)
EF0	This tornado was the last produced by the Mullica Hill supercell. Trees and branches were snapped and uprooted in town, but no structural damage occurred.						

=== September 2 event ===
List of confirmed tornadoes – Thursday, September 2, 2021
EF#	Location	County / Parish	State	Start Coord.	Time (UTC)	Path length	Max width
EF0	Dennis	Barnstable	MA	41.7413°N 70.2135°W	05:30–05:31	0.1 mi (0.16 km)	15 yd (14 m)
EF0	A weak tornado caused minor damage to two homes in town, and knocked down three large oak trees.						

=== Cedar Grove–Mullica Hill–Wenonah–Deptford, New Jersey ===
Cedar Grove–Mullica Hill–Mantua-Wenonah–Deptford, New Jersey
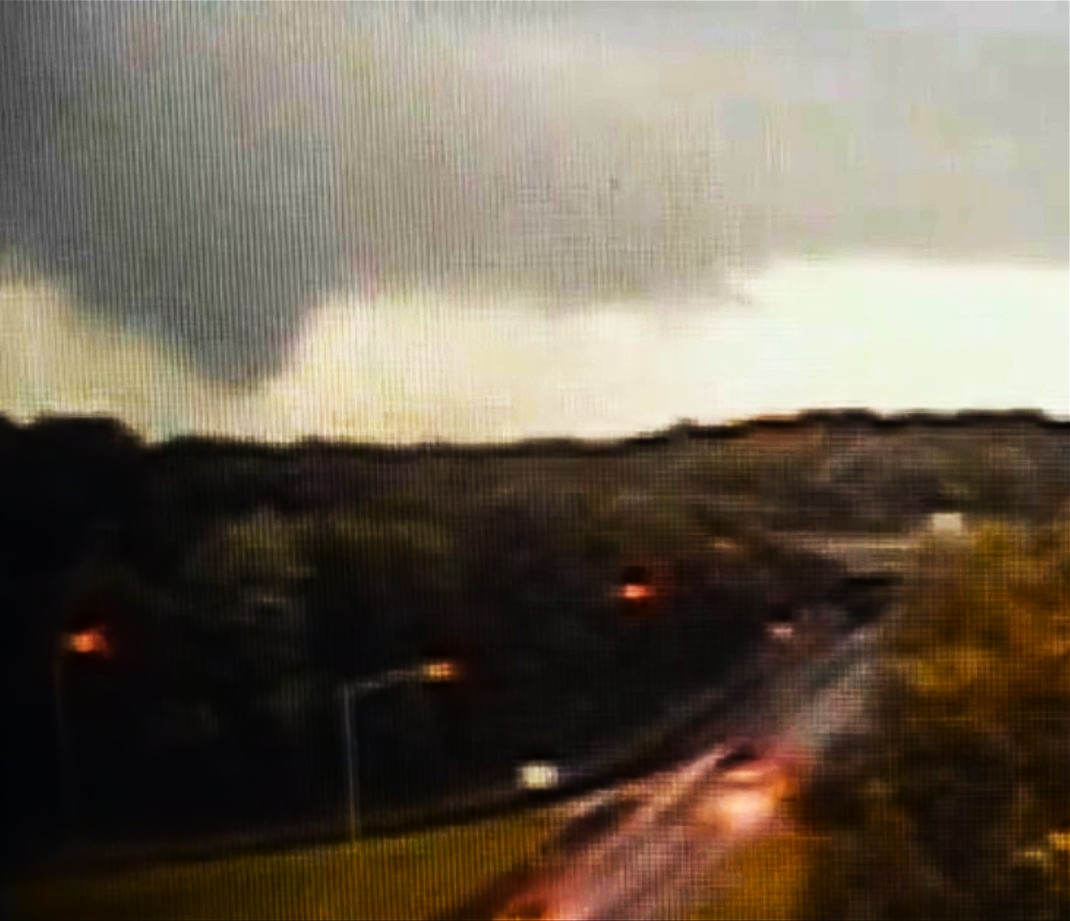
- A traffic camera still of the tornado near Deptford Township.

Meteorological history
- Formed: September 1, 2021, 6:10 p.m. EDT (UTC−04:00)
- Dissipated: September 1, 2021, 6:30 p.m. EDT (UTC−04:00)
- Duration: 20 minutes

EF3 tornado
- on the Enhanced Fujita scale
- Highest winds: 150 mph (240 km/h)

Overall effects
- Injuries: 2
- Damage: >$64 million (2023 USD)

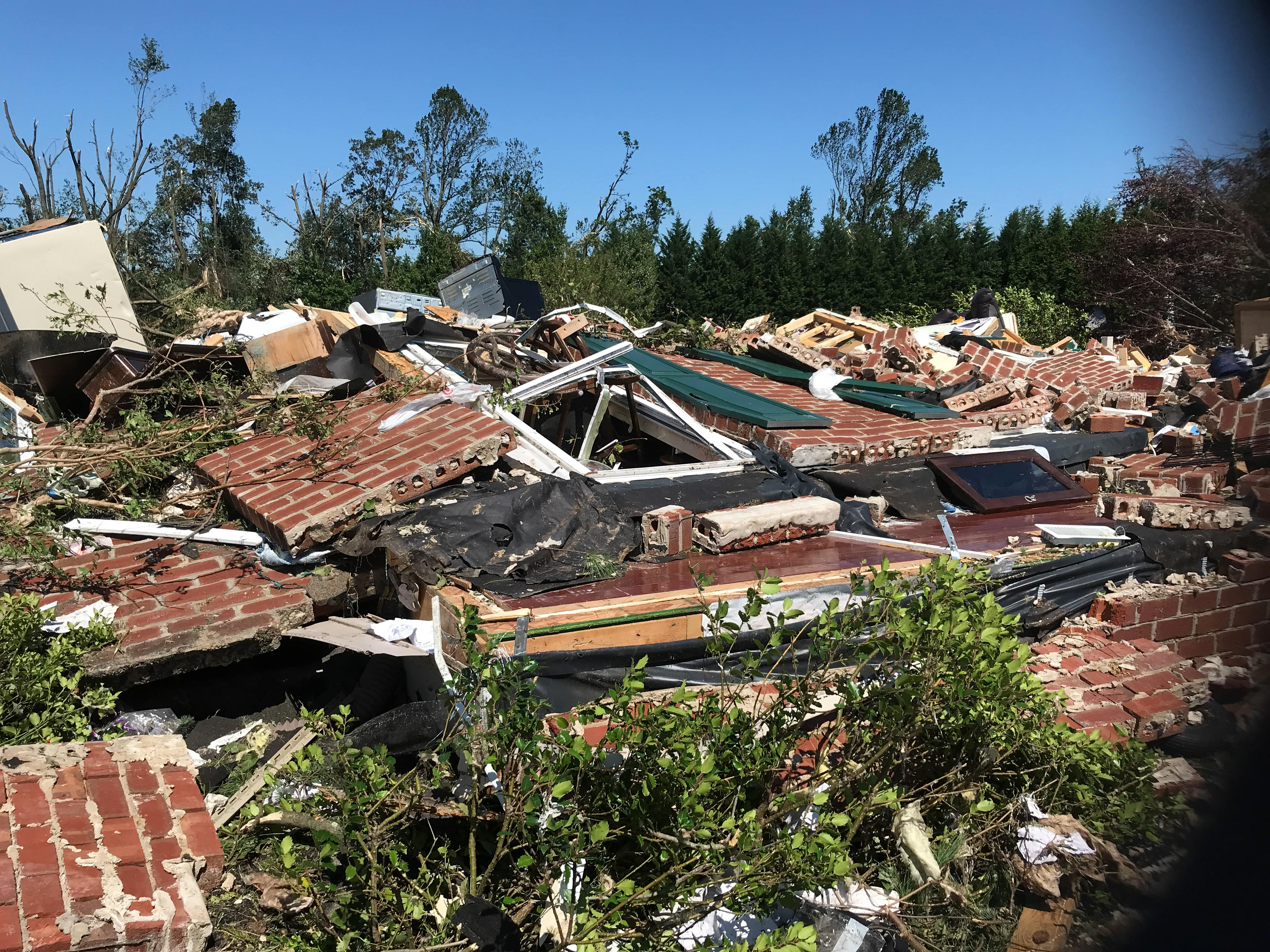
A home that was completely leveled at EF3 intensity on the east side of Mullica Hill, New Jersey

This intense wedge tornado caused major damage as it paralleled Route 45 to its west in Gloucester County. It first touched down at 6:10 p.m. EDT (22:10 UTC), east-southeast of Harrisonville, initially causing minor tree damage. Tree damage became more significant as it moved northeast into the eastern side of Cedar Grove, and dozens of trees were downed at EF1 intensity in the small community. The tornado became strong and destructive as it struck the Willow Oaks subdivision at the northeast edge of Cedar Grove, where multiple homes sustained significant structural damage on Marvin Lane. Roofs were ripped off, exterior walls were collapsed, vehicles were moved and damaged, and one home was left with only a few walls left standing, with the damage in this area being rated EF3. The tornado then weakened momentarily as it struck a commercial farm along Route 77 at the south edge of Mullica Hill, destroying barns and storage buildings at EF1 to EF2 intensity before strengthening again and moving through a subdivision in the eastern part of town.

The tornado reached its peak intensity of mid-range EF3 at this location as it moved over Salvatore Lane and Clems Run. Several two-story homes sustained total roof and exterior wall loss in this area, and cars were tossed around. One house was completely leveled, though it was not well-anchored and nearby trees did not sustain damage consistent with a tornado stronger than EF3 strength. Crossing US 322 past Mullica Hill, the tornado maintained its strength as it destroyed barns and silos at a large dairy farm, and completely mowed down a wide swath of large trees as it moved through a wooded area. In the worst affected area, every tree in the direct path was snapped near the base. The tornado then briefly weakened to EF1 intensity before regaining EF2 intensity as it moved into Mantua Township and passed west of Barnsboro, where many trees were downed, homes sustained roof damage, and a large commercial greenhouse was partially destroyed. Continuing to the northeast, it remained at EF2 strength as it impacted Wenonah, where garages were destroyed, a fire station was damaged, and some homes had roofs and exterior walls ripped off.

The tornado then narrowed and gradually weakened, causing mostly minor damage to trees, fences, roofs and siding occurred in Woodbury Heights and Deptford before dissipating at 6:30 p.m. EDT (22:30 UTC). It traveled 12.37 miles (19.91 km) and reached a maximum path width of 400 yards (370 m). Two people were injured. This was the first F3/EF3 rated tornado in the state of New Jersey since 1990, and one of only four ever confirmed in the state. Damages exceeded $64 million.

== See also ==
- List of North American tornadoes and tornado outbreaks
- Hurricane Katrina tornado outbreak
- Hurricane Rita tornado outbreak
