= Johnstown Flood (disambiguation) =

The Johnstown Flood was a disaster that occurred in Johnstown, Pennsylvania, United States on May 31, 1889.

Johnstown Flood may also refer to:

- Johnstown flood of 1936, a disaster that occurred in Johnstown in 1936
- Johnstown flood of 1977, a disaster that occurred in Johnstown in 1977
- 2021 Johnstown flooding caused by Hurricane Ida
- Johnstown Flood Museum, a history museum in Johnstown, Pennsylvania
- Johnstown Flood National Memorial, a memorial near South Fork, Pennsylvania that commemorates the 1889 flood
- The Johnstown Flood (1926 film), a silent drama film
- The Johnstown Flood (1989 film), a short documentary film
- The Johnstown Flood (book), a 1968 book by David McCullough about the 1889 flood
