= Johnston =

Johnston may refer to the surname Johnston or people with that name. It may also refer to:

== Places ==
=== Australia ===
- Johnston, Northern Territory
  - Electoral division of Johnston, an electoral division in the Northern Territory

=== United Kingdom ===
- Johnston, Pembrokeshire, Wales, United Kingdom
- Johnstown, Wrexham, Wales, United Kingdom
  - Johnston railway station, serves the village of Johnston in Pembrokeshire, Wales

=== United States ===
- Johnston, Iowa
- Johnston, Pennsylvania
- Johnston, Rhode Island
- Johnston, South Carolina
- Johnston County, North Carolina
- Johnston County, Oklahoma
- Port Johnston Coal Docks at Constable Hook

+ Johnston High School, Johnston, Iowa

- A.S. Johnston High School, Austin, Texas

=== Elsewhere ===
- Johnston Atoll, in the central Pacific Ocean
- Johnston Parish, New Brunswick, Canada

== People with given name ==
- Johnston McCulley (1883–1958), American writer best known as the creator of Zorro

== Other uses ==
- Johnston (typeface), the typeface used on the London Underground
- Johnston Press, a newspaper publishing company in the UK
- Johnston Model D1918 machine gun
- USS Johnston, two ships named in honor of United States Navy officer Johnston

== See also ==
- The Johnstons, Irish band
- Johnstone
  - Johnstone (surname)
- Johnson (disambiguation)
- Johnstown (disambiguation)
