= Johntown, Georgia =

Coordinates: 34°31′33.33″N 84°15′7.70″W

Johntown is an extinct town in the north-west region of Dawson County, in the U.S. state of Georgia., the town was mainly populated between the 1890s into the 1950s, with two schools being built, those being Antioch school, and Mount Pleasant, both being built at different periods, the remains of both are visible on Johntown Rd, Antioch being rock pillars, and Mount Pleasant being a floor joist and clapboard siding.

The town spanned from the start of Johntown Rd (Which was a pig trail at the time) to the start of Faussets Lake Rd

As of today, downtown Johntown has fully faded into the forest behind a house on Faussets Lake Rd, although Johntown Rd itself still exists, with a good number of people living in newer cabins built in the 80s-90s.

== History ==
A post office called Johntown was established in 1879 and remained in operation until 1944. The community was named after John S. Holden, an early postmaster.
