= Johnstown, Wisconsin =

Johnstown is the name of some places in the U.S. state of Wisconsin:

- Johnstown, Pepin County, Wisconsin, an unincorporated community
- Johnstown, Polk County, Wisconsin, a town
- Johnstown, Rock County, Wisconsin, a town
  - Johnstown (community), Wisconsin, an unincorporated community
  - Johnstown Center, Wisconsin, an unincorporated community
