= Johnsontown, Virginia =

Human settlement in Northampton County, Virginia, United States

Coordinates: 37°25′31″N 75°54′51″W

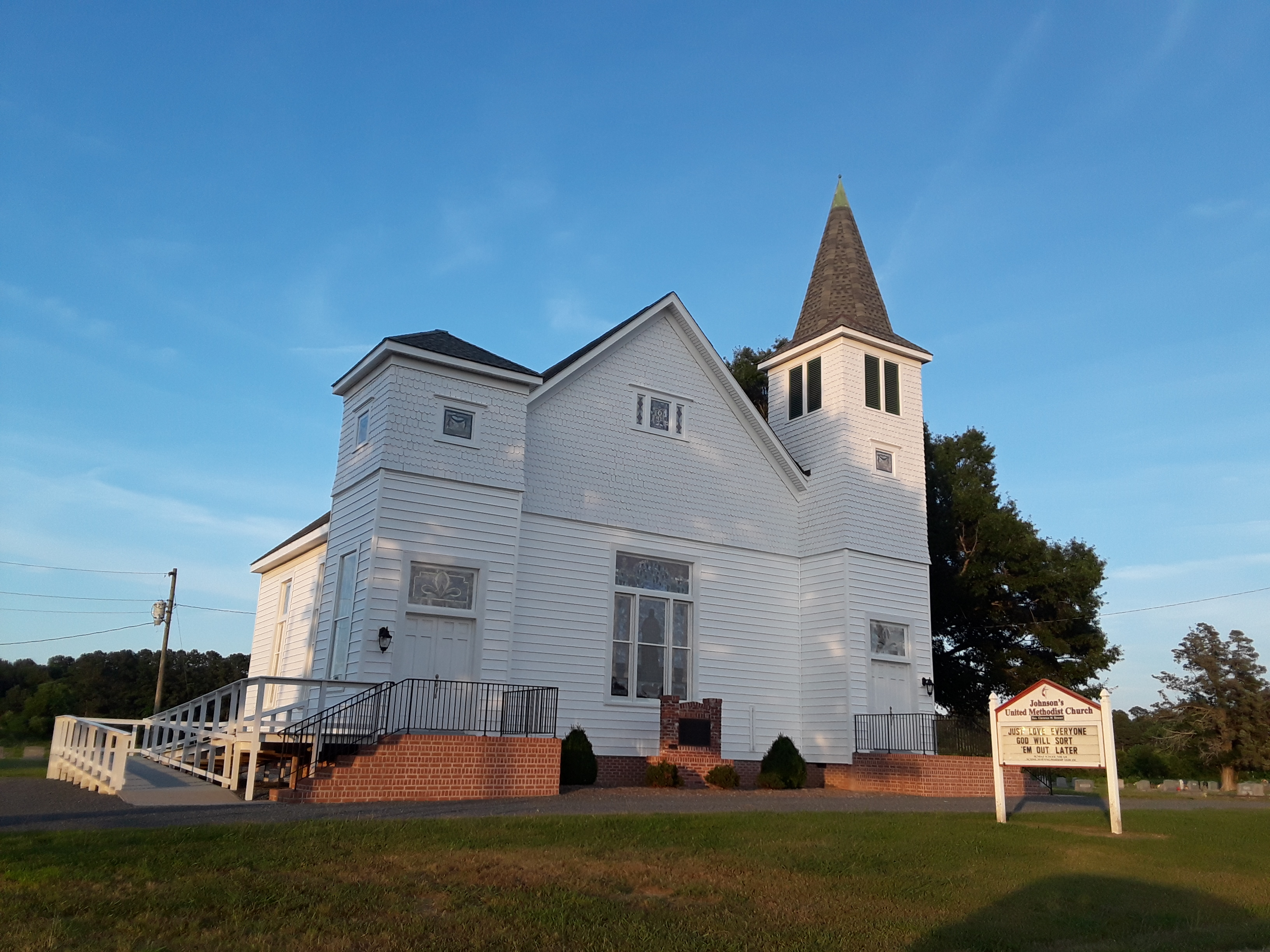
Johnson's United Methodist Church building in July 2018

Johnsontown is an unincorporated community in Northampton County, Virginia, United States.
