= Johnsontown, Louisville =

Neighborhood in Louisville, Kentucky

Johnsontown is a neighborhood of Louisville, Kentucky located along Dixie Highway (US 31W) and Johnsontown Road.

== Geography ==
Johnsontown, Louisville is located at 38°7′16″N 85°51′22″W.
