= Eden Isles, Louisiana =

Eden Isles, Louisiana Eden Isles
- Census-designated place
- Location of Eden Isles in Louisiana
- Coordinates: 30°13′27″N 89°48′01″W
- Country: United States
- State: Louisiana
- Parish: St. Tammany

Area
  - Total: 5.01 sq mi (12.98 km^{2})
  - Land: 3.04 sq mi (7.87 km^{2})
  - Water: 1.98 sq mi (5.12 km^{2})
- Elevation: 7 ft (2.1 m)

Population (2020)
  - Total: 6,983
  - Density: 2,562.6/sq mi (989.42/km^{2})
- Time zone: UTC-6 (CST)
  - Summer (DST): UTC-5 (CDT)
- Area code: 985
- FIPS code: 22-22722

Eden Isles is a census-designated place (CDP) in St. Tammany Parish, Louisiana, United States, on the northeast shore of Lake Pontchartrain. The population was 6,983 at the 2010 census, and 7,782 in 2020. It is part of the New Orleans–Metairie–Kenner metropolitan statistical area. The area consists of census tracts 408.04 and 408.05 in the 70458-9021 postal code.

Eden Isles is a residential community with homes built on a system of canals connecting to eastern Lake Pontchartrain, which also includes businesses along the Interstate-10 and Highway 11 commercial corridors as well as restaurants and marina services within the residential section.

== Geography ==
Eden Isles is located at 30°13′27″N 89°48′1″W (30.224116, -89.800390).

According to the United States Census Bureau, the CDP has a total area of 4.2 square miles (10.8 km^{2}), of which 3.2 square miles (8.4 km^{2}) is land and 0.97 square miles (2.5 km^{2}), or 22.82%, is water.

The area was devastated by Hurricane Katrina in August 2005.

Originally, the land was a marsh with a canal and levee bordering a pine forest behind Salmen High School and Our Lady of Lourdes Catholic Church and School. The marsh was drained and filled over a period of several years prior to the development of the community.

== Demographics ==
Historical population
| Census | Pop. | Note | %± |
|---|---|---|---|
| 1990 | 3,768 | | — |
| 2000 | 6,261 | | 66.2% |
| 2010 | 7,041 | | 12.5% |
| 2020 | 7,782 | | 10.5% |
U.S. Decennial Census; 1950 1960 1970 1980; 1990 2000 2010

Eden Isle first appeared as a census designated place the 1990 U.S. census.

Eden Isles racial composition as of 2020
| Race | Number | Percentage |
|---|---|---|
| White (non-Hispanic) | 5,778 | 74.25% |
| Black or African American (non-Hispanic) | 862 | 11.08% |
| Native American | 27 | 0.35% |
| Asian | 320 | 4.11% |
| Pacific Islander | 3 | 0.04% |
| Other/Mixed | 313 | 4.02% |
| Hispanic or Latino | 479 | 6.16% |

As of the 2020 United States census, there were 7,782 people, 3,225 households, and 2,105 families residing in the CDP.

== Education ==
It is within St. Tammany Parish Public Schools.

The community is zoned to Abney Elementary School, St. Tammany Junior High School, and Salmen High School.

St. Tammany Parish is within the service areas of two community colleges: Northshore Technical Community College and Delgado Community College.
