= Beardstown, Illinois =

Beardstown
- City
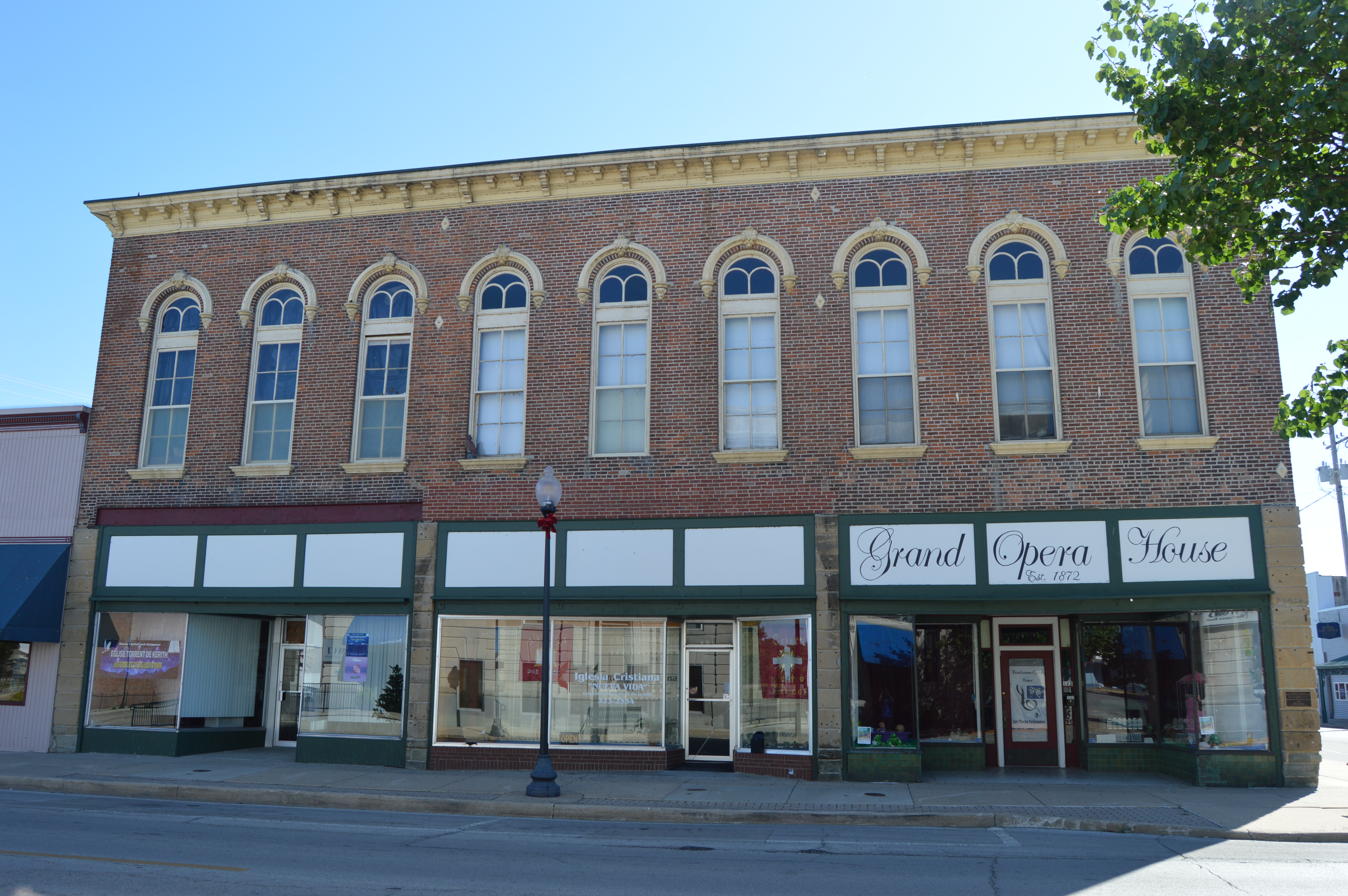
- The Beardstown Grand Opera House, a site on the National Register of Historic Places

- Location of Beardstown in Cass County, Illinois.
- Coordinates: 40°0′25″N 90°25′12″W
- Country: United States
- State: Illinois
- County: Cass

Area
  - Total: 3.65 sq mi (9.45 km^{2})
  - Land: 3.62 sq mi (9.37 km^{2})
  - Water: 0.027 sq mi (0.07 km^{2})
- Elevation: 449 ft (137 m)

Population (2020)
  - Total: 5,951
  - Density: 1,620.41/sq mi (625.64/km^{2})
- Time zone: UTC-6 (CST)
  - Summer (DST): UTC-5 (CDT)
- ZIP Code: 62618
- Area code(s): 217, 447
- FIPS code: 17-04351
- GNIS feature ID: 2394096
- Website: http://cityofbeardstown.org/

Beardstown is a city in Cass County, Illinois, United States. The population was 5,951 at the 2020 census. The public schools are in Beardstown Community Unit School District 15.

== Geography ==
Beardstown is located on the Illinois River.

According to the 2021 census gazetteer files, Beardstown has a total area of 3.65 square miles (9.45 km^{2}), of which 3.62 square miles (9.38 km^{2}) (or 99.21%) is land and 0.03 square miles (0.08 km^{2}) (or 0.79%) is water.

== Economy ==
Beardstown is located on the Illinois River, which plays an important role in the economy and history of the community, and is the site of two grain terminals where farm products are transferred to barges for transport. Hunting, fishing, and outdoor recreation along the river contribute to the local economy.

A large pork slaughterhouse, formerly owned by Kraft and Cargill and now by JBS, is a major employer and has attracted a substantial immigrant population to Beardstown in recent years.

The slaughterhouse and the people employed there were the focus of an economic and urban planning analysis by Faranak Miraftab, an Iranian-American urban scholar and professor of Urban and Regional Planning at the University of Illinois Urbana-Champaign. Her book, Global Heartland: Displaced Labor, Transnational Lives and Local Placemaking, discusses the economic and political forces that brought emigrants and immigrants to Beardstown.

== Demographics ==
Historical population
Census	Pop.	Note	%±
1870	2,528		—
1880	3,135		24.0%
1890	4,226		34.8%
1900	4,827		14.2%
1910	6,107		26.5%
1920	7,111		16.4%
1930	6,344		−10.8%
1940	6,505		2.5%
1950	6,080		−6.5%
1960	6,294		3.5%
1970	6,222		−1.1%
1980	6,338		1.9%
1990	5,270		−16.9%
2000	5,766		9.4%
2010	6,123		6.2%
2020	5,951		−2.8%
U.S. Decennial Census

=== Racial and ethnic composition ===
Beardstown city, Illinois – Racial and ethnic composition Note: the US Census treats Hispanic/Latino as an ethnic category. This table excludes Latinos from the racial categories and assigns them to a separate category. Hispanics/Latinos may be of any race.
Race / Ethnicity (NH = Non-Hispanic)	Pop 2000	Pop 2010	Pop 2020	% 2000	% 2010	% 2020
White alone (NH)	4,650	3,741	2,636	80.65%	61.10%	44.30%
Black or African American alone (NH)	28	322	659	0.49%	5.26%	11.07%
Native American or Alaska Native alone (NH)	13	7	17	0.23%	0.11%	0.29%
Asian alone (NH)	19	20	90	0.33%	0.33%	1.51%
Native Hawaiian or Pacific Islander alone (NH)	2	1	28	0.03%	0.02%	0.47%
Other race alone (NH)	2	3	9	0.03%	0.05%	0.15%
Mixed race or Multiracial (NH)	20	35	106	0.35%	0.57%	1.78%
Hispanic or Latino (any race)	1,032	1,994	2,406	17.90%	32.57%	40.43%
Total	5,766	6,123	5,951	100.00%	100.00%	100.00%

=== 2020 census ===
As of the 2020 census, Beardstown had a population of 5,951. The median age was 33.7 years. 28.8% of residents were under the age of 18 and 12.3% of residents were 65 years of age or older. For every 100 females there were 101.3 males, and for every 100 females age 18 and over there were 98.7 males age 18 and over.

99.8% of residents lived in urban areas, while 0.2% lived in rural areas.

There were 2,133 households in Beardstown, of which 40.5% had children under the age of 18 living in them. Of all households, 39.8% were married-couple households, 20.5% were households with a male householder and no spouse or partner present, and 29.2% were households with a female householder and no spouse or partner present. About 28.3% of all households were made up of individuals and 12.7% had someone living alone who was 65 years of age or older.

As of the 2020 census, there were 1,352 families residing in the city. The population density was 1,631.30 inhabitants per square mile (629.85/km^{2}). There were 2,368 housing units at an average density of 649.12 per square mile (250.63/km^{2}).

There were 2,368 housing units, of which 9.9% were vacant. The homeowner vacancy rate was 2.2% and the rental vacancy rate was 11.7%.

Racial composition as of the 2020 census
Race	Number	Percent
White	3,009	50.6%
Black or African American	678	11.4%
American Indian and Alaska Native	102	1.7%
Asian	90	1.5%
Native Hawaiian and Other Pacific Islander	29	0.5%
Some other race	1,411	23.7%
Two or more races	632	10.6%
Hispanic or Latino (of any race)	2,406	40.4%

=== Income and poverty ===
The median income for a household in the city was $43,425, and the median income for a family was $49,500. Males had a median income of $36,764 versus $25,108 for females. The per capita income for the city was $20,599. About 20.2% of families and 22.4% of the population were below the poverty line, including 25.1% of those under age 18 and 10.0% of those age 65 or over.

== History ==
Beardstown was first settled by Thomas Beard in 1819; he erected a log cabin at the edge of the Illinois River, from which he traded with the local Native Americans and ran a ferry. The town was laid out in 1827 and was incorporated as a city in 1896. During the Black Hawk War in 1832, it was a base of supplies for the Illinois troops.

Thomas Beard's son, Edward "Red" Beard, a noted gambler and saloon keeper of the Old West, was killed in a gunfight in Kansas in 1873 by "Rowdy Joe" Lowe. Earlier, he had built a two-story brick building which was used for 85 years as a store and inn. This inn is alleged to have sheltered Abraham Lincoln on his visits to Beardstown, but that is legend and unconfirmed. The building was demolished and replaced by a post office. William Henry Herndon, Lincoln's Springfield law partner, claimed that Lincoln contracted syphilis from a prostitute in Beardstown, an incident author Gore Vidal colorfully recounts in his historical novel Lincoln (1984).

The Beardstown Courthouse was the site of a famous trial which helped build Abraham Lincoln's reputation as a lawyer after he used a copy of a farmer's almanac to undermine the credibility of the prosecution's key witness. The scene was later depicted in a painting by Norman Rockwell. A Lincoln Museum is on the second floor of the courthouse along with many Native American relics.

== The Beardstown Ladies ==
From 1984 to 1993, a group of 16 late-aged women were picking stocks in the Dow Jones and over the course of nine years were claiming returns of 23.4% on their stocks. Once they went public with the amazing returns, they gained national recognition for their success. The Beardstown Ladies, with an average age of 70 (1994), were asked to appear on The Donahue Show, CBS's Morning Show, NBC's The Today Show, and ABC's Good Morning America. For six straight years they were honored by the National Association of Investors Corp's "All-Star Investment Clubs". In 1993, they produced their first home video for investors called, The Beardstown Ladies: Cooking Up Profits on Wall Street. By 1994, they wrote their first book, The Beardstown Ladies' Common-Sense Investment Guide, which sold over 800,000 copies by 1998 and was a New York Times Best Seller. The Beardstown Ladies become a global phenomenon and TV stations from Germany, Brazil, and Japan were interviewing them and taping their monthly meetings in Beardstown. The seeds of scandal were planted in late 1998: a Chicago magazine noticed that the group's returns included the fees the women paid every month. Without them, the returns dwindled to just 9%, underperforming the Dow. An article in The Wall Street Journal led the ladies to hire an outside auditor, which proved they had indeed misstated their returns. Time jokingly stated that they should be jailed for fraud and misrepresentation. As of 2006, the Beardstown Ladies were still buying stocks.

== Notable people ==
- William "Duff" Armstrong, accused murderer, tried in Beardstown, defended by Abraham Lincoln.
- Walter Flanigan, co-founder of National Football League, born in Beardstown.
- Stanley J. Korsmeyer, physician, born in Beardstown
- Frank McErlane spent his last years here
- Richard Henry Mills, (born 1929) Judge of the U. S. District Court for the Central District of Illinois.
- Red Norvo, jazz vibraphone pioneer, born in Beardstown.
- Janice O'Hara, All-American Girls Professional Baseball League player, born in Beardstown.
- Glen Seator (1956–2002), visual artist and architectural sculptor.
- Jesse Wallace, United States Navy Captain and the 27th Governor of American Samoa

== See also ==
- Beardstown Community Unit School District 15
- Beardstown Grand Opera House
- List of photographs of Abraham Lincoln
- Fourth principal meridian
