= USS Eldorado =

United States Navy command ship

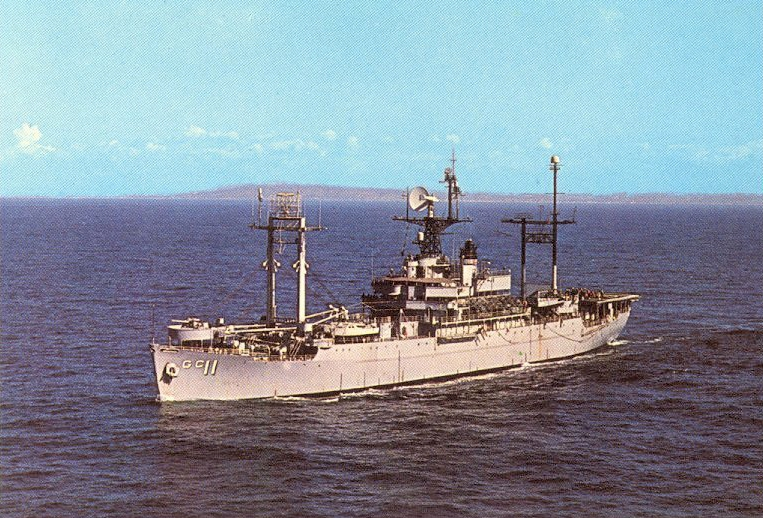
- USS Eldorado (LCC-11)

History

United States
- Name: USS Eldorado
- Namesake: Eldorado Mountains in Nevada
- Builder: North Carolina Shipbuilding Company, Wilmington, North Carolina
- Launched: 26 October 1943
- Acquired: 1 February 1944
- Commissioned: 25 August 1944
- Decommissioned: 8 November 1972
- Stricken: 16 November 1972
- Honours and awards: WWII: 2 battle stars; Korea: 8 battle stars; Vietnam: Meritorious Unit Commendation and 10 campaign stars
- Fate: Sold by Defense Reutilization and Marketing Service (DRMS) for scrapping, 1 December 1976

General characteristics
- Class & type: Mount McKinley-class amphibious command ship
- Displacement: 7,234 long tons (7,350 t)
- Length: 459 ft 2 in (139.95 m)
- Beam: 63 ft (19 m)
- Draft: 28 ft 3 in (8.61 m)
- Speed: 16 knots (30 km/h; 18 mph)
- Complement: 684
- Armament: 2 × 5"/38 caliber guns (2×1)

USS Eldorado (AGC-11) was a Mount McKinley-class amphibious force command ship, named after a mountain range in Nevada. The ship was designed as an amphibious force flagship, a floating command post with advanced communications equipment and extensive combat information spaces to be used by the amphibious forces commander and landing force commander during large-scale operations.

== WW II, commissioning ==
The Eldorado was launched on 26 October 1943 as Monsoon by the North Carolina Shipbuilding Company in Wilmington, North Carolina, under a Maritime Commission contract, sponsored by Mrs. P. A. Peeples; transferred to the US Navy on 1 February 1944; converted by Bethlehem Steel Corporation in Brooklyn, New York; and commissioned on 25 August 1944, with Captain Jesse Wallace in command.

1944

The Eldorado sailed from Naval Station Norfolk on 15 September 1944, and arrived at San Diego on 29 September to embark Rear Admiral Lawrence F. Reifsnider who broke his flag as Commander, Amphibious Group 4. In November, it sailed to Pearl Harbor and there became the flagship for Vice Admiral Richmond K. Turner, Commander, Amphibious Forces, Pacific.

1945

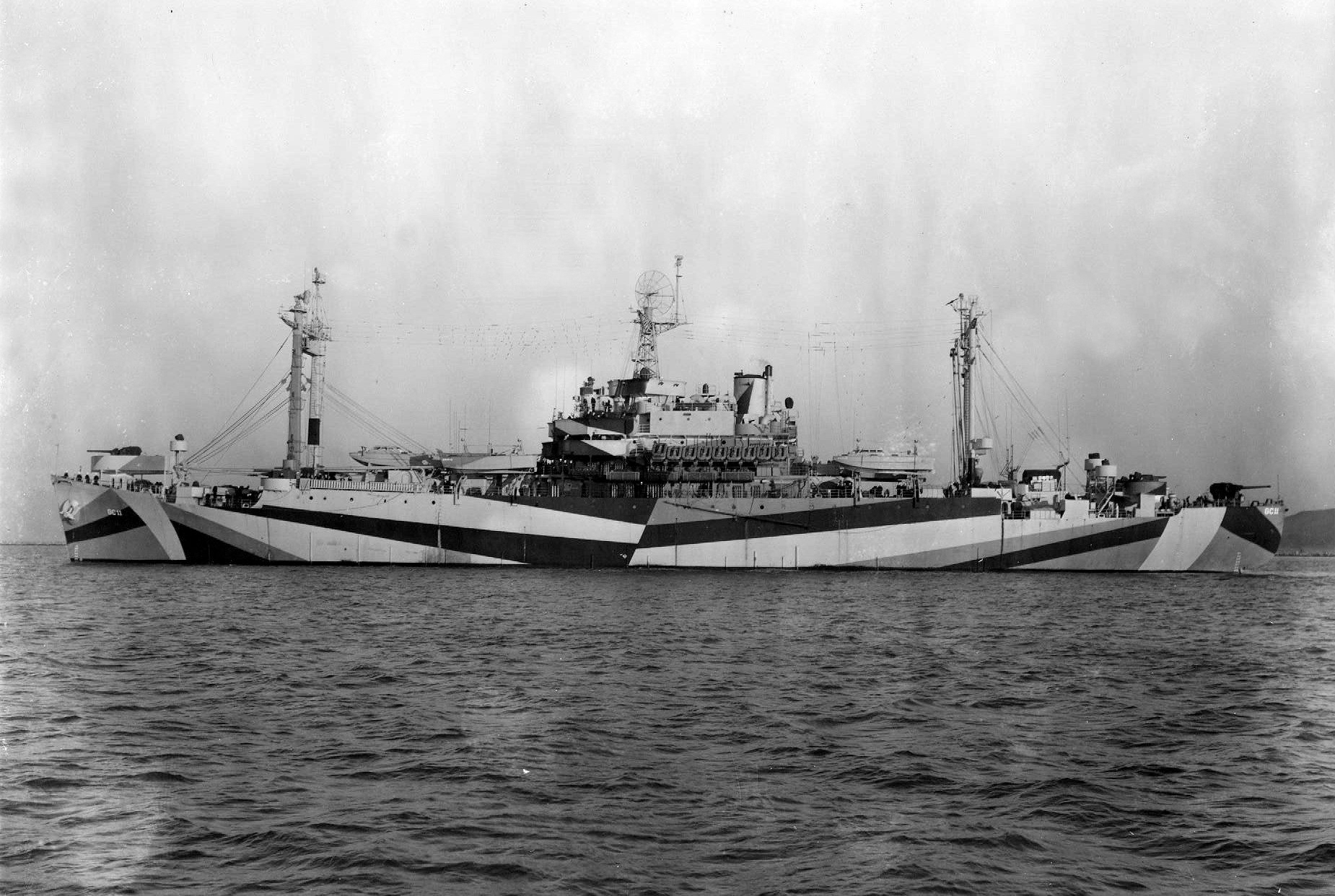
Eldorado in November 1944.

On 27 January 1945, after rehearsal landings in Hawaii, the command ship sailed for the Marianas and further preparations for the landing on Iwo Jima. The ship also carried General Holland Smith, USMC, and his staff, and Secretary of the Navy James Forrestal and his party when it sailed from Saipan on 16 February for Iwo Jima. The Eldorado lay off Iwo Jima from 19 February to 9 March, its passengers directing operations ashore and afloat. It served as headquarters for war correspondents, and broadcast directly from the beachhead to the people at home through its facilities. One of these correspondents was Joe Rosenthal of the Associated Press, who took the famous American flag-raising photo on Mount Suribachi.

The Eldorado arrived at Guam on 12 March 1945, and embarked Lieutenant General Simon B. Buckner, Commanding General of the 10th Army, then after rehearsals at Leyte in the Philippines, sailed off to the Hagushi Beaches, Okinawa, for the initial invasion landings on 1 April. The ship carried out the same type of duties it had performed at Iwo Jima. Since both the Commander, Air Support Control Unit, and the Force Fighter Director Officer were embarked, Eldorado's combat information center was the central unit in the air defense against the day and night air raids. General Buckner and his staff debarked on 18 April to establish headquarters on the island itself, and until the ship's departure on 18 May, it was visited by several guests, including Admirals Chester W. Nimitz, William F. Halsey, Jr. and Raymond A. Spruance and war correspondent Ernie Pyle.

== Post-war ==
In 1945, at the end of the war, the Eldorado was at Manila preparing for the proposed invasion of the Japanese home islands. It returned to Pearl Harbor in October where Admiral Turner and his staff debarked.

Alternately at Pearl Harbor and at west coast ports, the Eldorado continued to serve as the flagship for succeeding amphibious commanders in the Pacific. There were two exceptions: From April to September 1947 and again from January to July 1949, it flew the flag of Commander, Naval Forces, Western Pacific, and cruised to Chinese waters. During the second tour, the Eldorado departed Shanghai only a short time before that city fell to the Communists.

== Korean War ==
With the outbreak of the Korean War in June 1950, the Eldorado was ordered to the Far East. The Eldorado was the flagship for Rear Admiral Lyman A. Thackrey, Commander, Amphibious Group 3, and it acted as standby for the USS Mount McKinley during the invasion of Inchon, South Korea, and coordinated and controlled the logistics operations. In October 1950, it sailed to Riwon to support the continued northwest advance of United Nations troops. Returning to Japan in November, the Eldorado was ordered again to Inchon to direct the evacuation. It was at Inchon again in the spring and summer of 1951, and in June hoisted the flag of Vice Admiral Ingolf N. Kiland, Commander, Amphibious Forces, Pacific Fleet. The Eldorado was visited by Generals Matthew B. Ridgway and Van Fleet, and the commanding generals of the British troops and Turkish Brigades during its stay at Inchon, and sent the first pictures of the Korean Armistice Agreement talks to the outside world.

The Eldorado returned to the States and became the flagship for Rear Admiral W. E. Moore, Commander, Amphibious Group 1, in October 1952. It sailed for the Far East where Admiral Moore assumed command of TF 90's amphibious forces. During this tour, the Eldorado assisted the Japanese Government during the floods at Fukuoka, and directed Operation Big Switch, the transportation of Chinese and Korean prisoners of war from the camps at Cheju Do and Koje-do to the port of Inchon for repatriation.

== Post-war ==
The Eldorado returned to the west coast in the fall of 1953, and continued to serve as the flagship for Amphibious Group 1, now commanded by Rear Admiral Lorenzo Sabin, Jr., until June 1954. It embarked Vice Admiral Thomas G. W. Settle, Commander, Amphibious Forces, Pacific, until August. On 15 February 1955, the Eldorado sailed for Keeling, Formosa, where it operated as the flagship for Vice Admiral Alfred M. Pride, Commander, 7th Fleet, until 17 August. The Eldorado returned to San Diego for amphibious exercises, and on 13 December, Rear Admiral George C. Towner broke his flag on board as Commander, Amphibious Group 3 and Eastern Pacific.

In the summer of 1956, the Eldorado sailed to arctic waters with Army officers embarked, to resupply bases at Wainwright, Alaska, and Point Barrow, Alaska. From December 1956 to January 1957, it was the flagship for Vice Admiral Carl F. Espe, Commander, Amphibious Forces, Pacific, and during the next month, for Vice Admiral Robert L. Dennison, Commander, United States First Fleet. From June 1957 through 1960, the Eldorado served as the flagship for four successive commanders of Amphibious Group 1, Rear Admirals Frederick C. Stelter, Jr., Charles K. Duncan, Charles O. Triebel, and Charles C. Kirkpatrick. The only interruption to this service was in October and November 1958, when it served Vice Admiral John Sylvester, Commander, Amphibious Forces, Pacific, as flagship.

In addition to operations along the west coast from her home port at San Diego, the Eldorado took part in Arctic supply operations once more in the summer of 1957, and cruised to the Far East from January to May 1958, and again from December 1959 into 1960. During the second of these, as the flagship, the Eldorado participated in exercise "Blue Star," a joint Navy-Marine and Nationalist Chinese Navy-Marine amphibious operation off southern Taiwan. In April and May, the Eldorado visited ports in Indonesia and Australia, participating in Australia's 18th annual celebration of the Battle of the Coral Sea before returning to San Diego on 31 May where it remained. The Eldorado was the flagship for the eight-week expedition for the 5th MEB during the Cuban Missile Crisis and then participating in local operations through 1962.

== Vietnam War ==
The Eldorado served as the flagship for the Commander Amphibious Forces Pacific Fleet in rotation with USS Estes and Mount McKinley during the Vietnam War. In 1967, the ship received the Navy Meritorious Unit Commendation for its role in twelve amphibious assaults in Vietnam, in conjunction with the Amphibious Ready Group and the Marine Special Landing Force.

In January 1969, Eldorado's designation was changed to LCC-11. Also, in 1969, USS Eldorado LCC11 was awarded the Navy Unit Commendation for her actions concerning command and control during Operation Bold Mariner, the largest amphibious landing since WWII. The operation occurred in the Batangan Peninsula area of South Vietnam.

During the Eldorado's decommissioning in November 1972, it was berthed adjacent to the USS Blue Ridge at the 32nd Street Naval Station in San Diego, and transferred much of her equipment to its successor prior to scrapping.

The Eldorado received two battle stars for its World War II service and eight battle stars for its Korean War service.
