= Jesse Wallace =

United States Navy officer and Governor of American Samoa

Jesse Rink Wallace
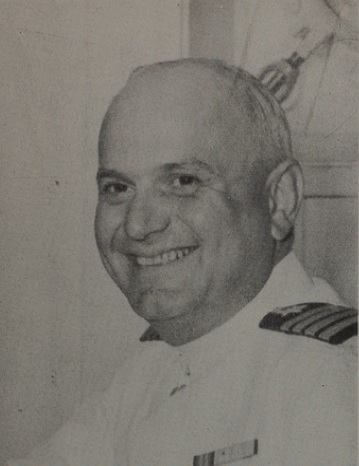
- Wallace in 1944

Governor of American Samoa
- In office July 30, 1940 – August 8, 1940
- Preceded by: Edward Hanson
- Succeeded by: Laurence Wild

Personal details
- Born: July 17, 1899 Beardstown, Illinois
- Died: January 29, 1961 (aged 61) Milwaukee, Wisconsin
- Resting place: United States Naval Academy Cemetery
- Spouse: Mary Wallace
- Education: United States Naval Academy
- Occupation: Naval officer
- Awards: Legion of Merit

Military service
- Allegiance: United States
- Branch/service: United States Navy
- Years of service: 1922–1952
- Rank: Rear admiral
- Commands: Eldorado; Cushing
- Battles/wars: World War II: Battle of Iwo Jima; Battle of Okinawa

Jesse Rink Wallace (July 17, 1899 – January 29, 1961) was a United States Navy Rear admiral and the Governor of American Samoa. He served as governor for a period of only ten days from July 30, 1940, to August 8, 1940. After his brief time as governor, Wallace served with the Office of Judge Advocate General of the Navy until August 1944, when he was ordered to the Pacific Theater as commanding officer of the Amphibious command ship Eldorado. He led that ship during the Iwo Jima and Okinawa campaigns while serving as flagship of Vice admiral Richmond K. Turner.

Following the war, he became the Chief of Staff of the U.S. Naval Academy from 1946 to 1949 and later became chief of staff and aide to the commandant of the Ninth Naval District before retiring in 1952.

== Early career ==
Jesse Rink Wallace was born on July 17, 1899, in Beardstown, Illinois, as the son of Burlington Railroad's Division accountant George C. Wallace and his wife, Clara. Young Jesse graduated from Beardstown High School in summer 1918 and passed the competitive examinations to the United States Naval Academy at Annapolis, Maryland, receiving an appointment in June 1918. While at the academy, Wallace was active in soccer, football and track.

Wallace graduated with a Bachelor of Science degree on June 3, 1922, and was assigned to the destroyer tender Denebole one month later. He took part in the cruise to the Mediterranean, visiting ports in Turkey, Tunisia, Gibraltar, and the Azores, before returning to New York City in late December 1923. Wallace was later transferred to the battleship Wyoming and took part in the cruises in the Atlantic and a midshipman training cruise to Europe. He was promoted to Lieutenant (junior grade) on June 3, 1925.

In 1927, Wallace was transferred to the armored cruiser Seattle and participated in the cruise along the East coast, and, while aboard, he was promoted to lieutenant on September 15, 1928. Wallace was ordered to the George Washington University in Washington, D.C., in July 1929 and graduated with a law degree in June 1932.

Upon his graduation, Wallace was ordered to Pearl Harbor, Hawaii, and assigned to the staff, Commander, Minecraft, Battle Force under Rear admiral William C. Watts. He served in that capacity until June 1935, when he was transferred to the Office of Judge Advocate General of the Navy under Rear admiral Claude C. Bloch. He continued in that post under new Judge Advocate General, Rear admiral Gilbert J. Rowcliff until summer 1937.

In August 1937, Wallace was ordered to San Diego, California, and assumed command of destroyer Cushing. He was promoted to lieutenant commander on October 13, 1937, and then took part in the training exercises, tactics, and fleet problems. Except for brief periods of training at Pearl Harbor and one cruise to the Caribbean, Cushing cruised the west coast from San Diego for exercises and training.

Wallace was detached from Cushing in late May 1940 and ordered to Naval Station Tutuila, American Samoa for duty as attorney general on the staff of Governor, Commander Edward Hanson. When Hanson completed his term at the end of July that year, Wallace assumed temporary duty as Governor of American Samoa, holding that office for one week before Laurence Wild arrived.

== World War II ==
Following the Japanese Attack on Pearl Harbor and the United States entry into World War II, Wallace was promoted to commander on January 1, 1942, and to the temporary rank of captain on June 21 that year. He served consecutively in the Office of Judge Advocate General of the Navy in Washington, D.C., under Rear admirals Walter B. Woodson and Thomas L. Gatch. From February to April 1944, Wallace served as counsel to Admiral Thomas C. Hart during the Court of Inquiry into the Pearl Harbor attack.

In August 1944, Wallace was ordered to the Bethlehem Steel Corporation in Brooklyn, New York, and assumed command of newly commissioned Amphibious command ship Eldorado. He embarked with his ship via Panama Canal Zone for San Diego, California, arriving in late September and becoming the flagship of Commander, Amphibious Group 4 under Rear admiral Lawrence F. Reifsnider. Wallace subsequently sailed for Hawaii where Eldorado became the flagship of Vice Admiral Richmond K. Turner, Commander, Amphibious Forces, Pacific.

Wallace then commanded Eldorado during the amphibious landings on Iwo Jima in February 1945 and Okinawa in April that year and took part in the preparations for the proposed invasion of the Japanese home islands. He was relieved by Captain Murray J. Tichenor in late July 1945 and ordered back to the United States. For his service in Pacific, Wallace received the Legion of Merit.

== Postwar service ==
Following the Surrender of Japan, Wallace assumed duty as Chief of Staff and Aide to the Superintendent of the United States Naval Academy, Rear admiral James L. Holloway Jr. and later was transferred to for duty as Chief of staff to the Commandant, Ninth Naval District, Rear admiral J. Cary Jones at Naval Station Great Lakes, Illinois. While in this capacity, he was co-responsible for the administration of naval facilities and units in Ohio, Michigan, Kentucky, Indiana, Illinois, Wisconsin, Minnesota, Iowa, Missouri, North Dakota, South Dakota, Nebraska, and Kansas.

Wallace retired from active duty on July 1, 1952, completing 30 years of service and was advanced to the rank of rear admiral on the retired list for having been specially commended in combat.

== Retirement ==
Upon his retirement from the Navy, Wallace joined the manufacturer of heavy equipment A.O. Smith Corporation in Milwaukee, Wisconsin, as assistant treasurer, a position he held until his promotion to company's secretary in 1954. Beside his job with A.O. Smith Corporation, he served as a member of the board of directors of several firms in Milwaukee, a trustee of Downer College, and also was active in the Junior Achievement organization and American Red Cross.

Wallace served with A.O. Smith Corporation until his death of heart attack on January 29, 1961. He was buried with full military honors at the United States Naval Academy Cemetery. Wallace was survived by his wife Mary; son Jesse T., and two daughters Meridee and Anne.
