= Operation Passage to Freedom =

Relocation of people from North to South Vietnam (1954–1955)

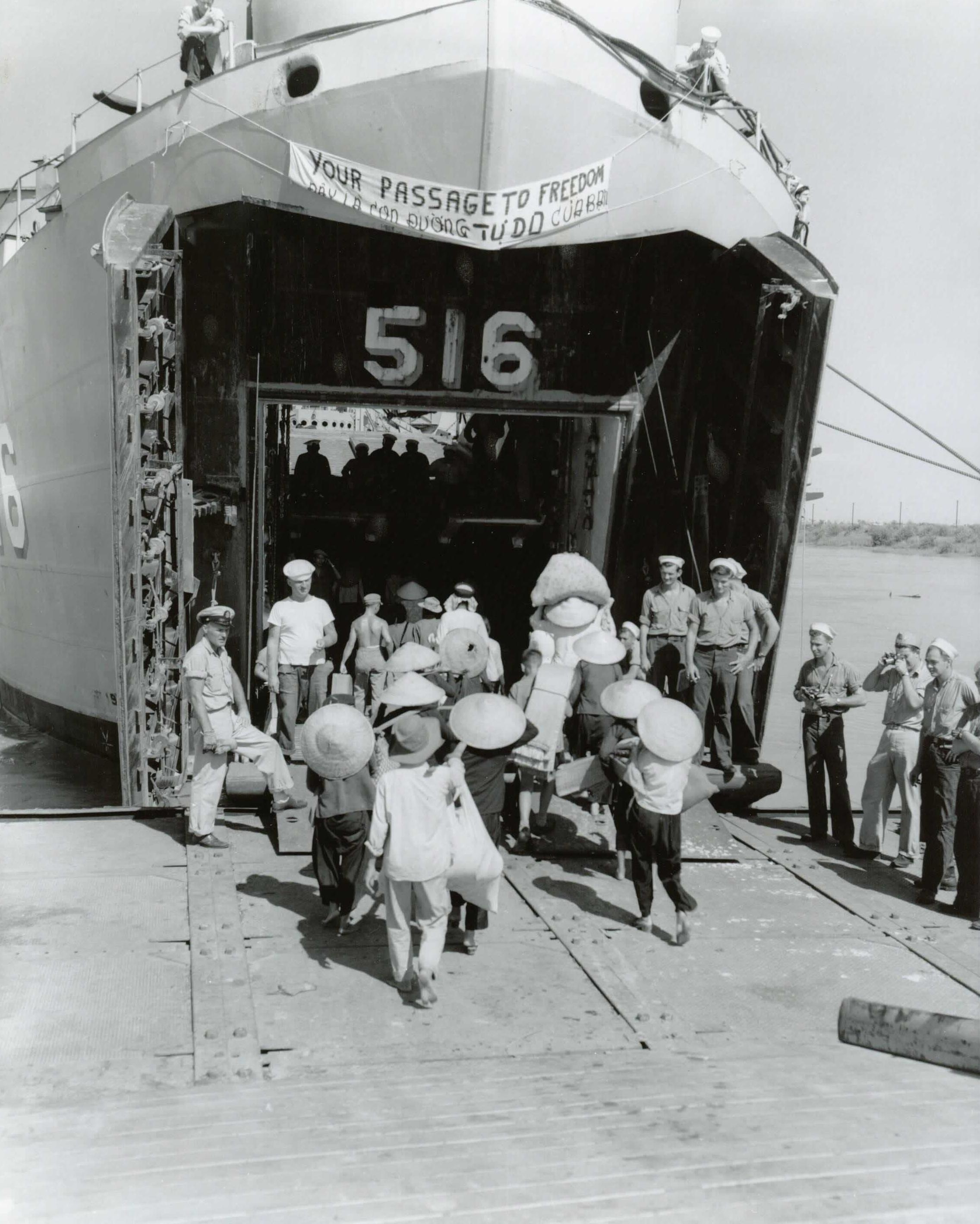
Up to a million people (about 800 thousand of them are Catholics) left communist North Vietnam during Operation Passage to Freedom after the country was partitioned (USS Calaveras County).

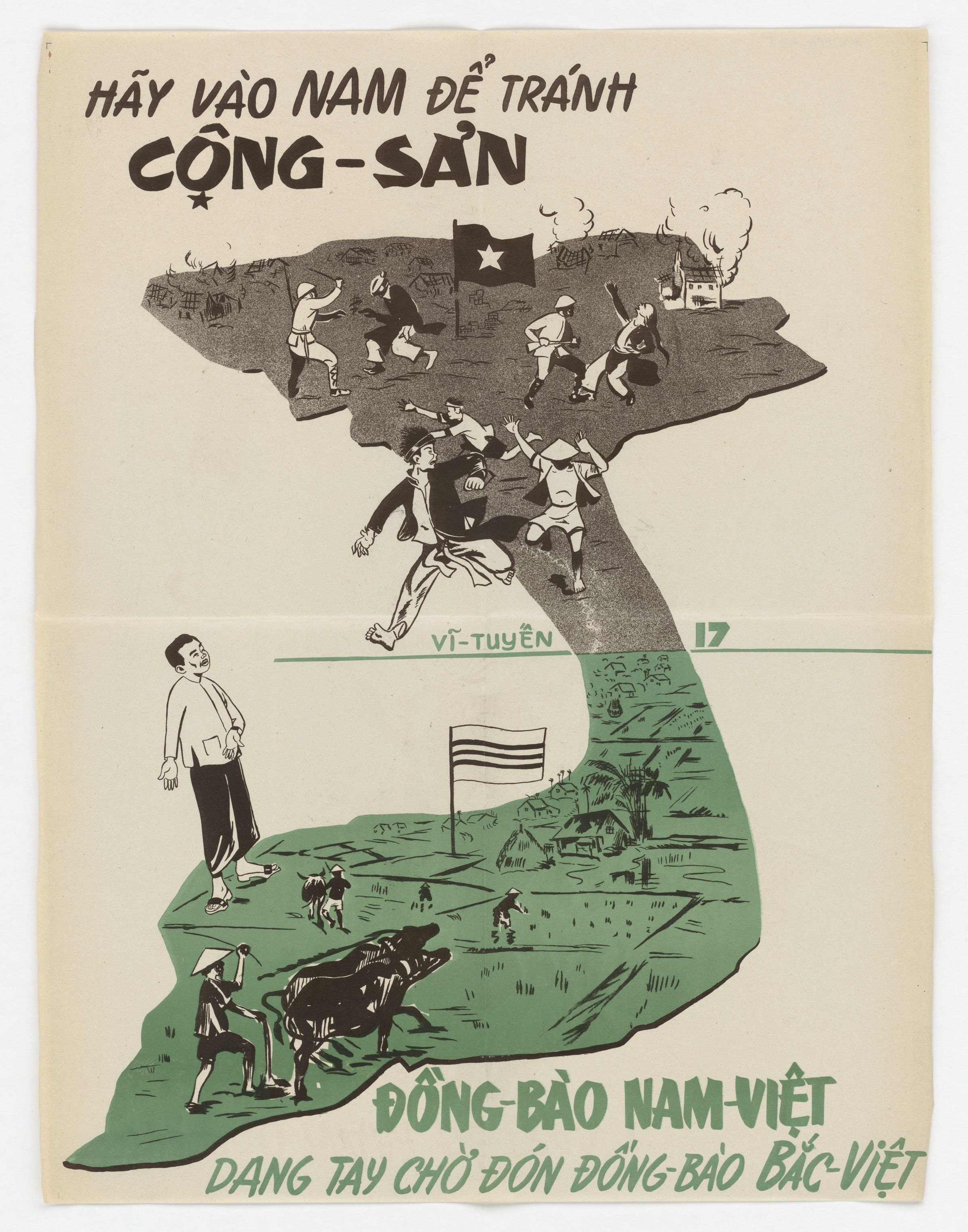
Propaganda poster exhorting Northerners to move South-title: "Go South to avoid Communism". Bottom caption: "Southern compatriots are welcoming Northern brothers and sisters with open arms."

Operation Passage to Freedom was a term used by the United States Navy to describe the propaganda effort and the assistance in transporting 310,000 Vietnamese civilians, soldiers and non-Vietnamese members of the French Army from communist North Vietnam (the Democratic Republic of Vietnam) to non-communist South Vietnam (the State of Vietnam, later to become the Republic of Vietnam) between the years 1954 and 1955. The French and other countries may have transported a further 500,000. In the wake of the French defeat at the Battle of Dien Bien Phu, the Geneva Accords of 1954 decided the fate of French Indochina after eight years of war between the French Union forces and the Viet Minh, which fought for Vietnamese independence under communist rule. The accords resulted in the partition of Vietnam at the 17th parallel north, with Ho Chi Minh's communist Viet Minh in control of the north and the French-backed State of Vietnam in the south. The agreements allowed a 300-day period of grace, ending on May 18, 1955, in which people could move freely between the two Vietnams before the border was sealed. The partition was intended to be temporary, pending elections in 1956 to reunify the country under a national government. Between 600,000 and one million people moved south, including more than 200,000 French citizens and soldiers in the French army while between 14,000 and 45,000 civilians and approximately 100,000 Viet Minh fighters moved in the opposite direction.

The 1954–1955 Great Migration of Northerners was facilitated primarily by the French Air Force and Navy. American naval vessels supplemented the French in evacuating northerners to Saigon, the southern capital. The operation was accompanied by a large humanitarian relief effort, bankrolled mainly by the United States government in an attempt to absorb a large tent city of refugees that had sprung up outside Saigon. For the US, the migration was a public relations coup, generating wide coverage of the flight of Vietnamese from the perceived oppression of communism to the "free world" in the south. The period was marked by a Central Intelligence Agency-backed propaganda campaign on behalf of South Vietnam's Catholic Prime Minister Ngo Dinh Diem. The campaign was usually viewed to exhort Catholics to flee "impending religious persecution" under communism, and around 60% of the north's 1.14 million Catholics immigrated. The Viet Minh also tried to forcefully prevent would-be refugees from leaving, especially in rural areas where there were no French or American military forces.

The migration was conventionally supposed to boost the Catholic power base of Diem; whereas the majority of Vietnam's Catholics previously lived in the north, now most were in the south. Fearing a communist victory, Diem cancelled the elections. Believing the newly arrived Catholics to be a bastion of solid anti-communist support, Diem supposedly treated the new constituents as a special interest group. In the long run, the northern Catholics never fully integrated into Southern society and Diem's alleged favouritism toward them were often thought to cause tension that culminated in the Buddhist crisis of 1963, which ended with his downfall and assassination. In fact, Catholics moving to the South were foremost the active agents of their own lives, not because of the CIA or Ngô Đình Diệm's efforts. About 25% of the migrants were non-Catholic and a number of Catholics who moved to the South did not do so because of their religion. Northern Catholic émigrés actually brought complex challenges to the Church in South Vietnam, and Ngô Đình Diệm also did not resettle northern Catholics in and around Sài Gòn as a deliberate and strategic policy. As Vietnamese Catholics were far from monolithic, and were not in any way unified in their political stances, it is a myth to conflate "Catholic refugees with all Catholics, with all refugees or with staunch supporters of Ngô Đình Diệm". In reality, the Personalist Revolution under Diệm's regime promoted religious freedom and diversity to oppose communism's atheism. However, this framework itself ultimately enabled Buddhist activists to threaten the state that supported their religious liberty.

== Background ==
At the end of World War II, the Viet Minh had proclaimed independence under the Democratic Republic of Vietnam (DRV) in September 1945. This occurred after the withdrawal of Imperial Japan, which had seized control of French Indochina during World War II. The military struggle restarted in November 1946 when France attempted to reassert control over Indochina with an attack on the northern port city of Haiphong. The DRV was recognised by the Soviet Union and the People's Republic of China (PRC), while the western powers recognised the French-backed State of Vietnam, nominally led by Emperor Bảo Đại, but with a French-trained Vietnamese National Army (VNA) which was loyal to the French Union forces. In May 1954, after eight years of fighting, the French were surrounded and defeated in a mountainous northern fortress at the Battle of Dien Bien Phu. France's withdrawal from Indochina was finalised in the Geneva Accords of July 1954, after two months of negotiations between Ho's DRV, France, the PRC and the Soviet Union. Under the terms of the agreement, Vietnam was temporarily divided at the 17th parallel north pending elections in 1956 to choose a national government that would administer a reunified country.

The communist Viet Minh were left in control of North Vietnam, while the State of Vietnam controlled the south. French Union forces would gradually withdraw from Vietnam as the situation stabilised. Both Vietnamese sides were unsatisfied with the outcome at Geneva; Ngo Dinh Diem, Prime Minister of the State of Vietnam, denounced France's agreement and ordered his delegation not to sign. He stated "We cannot recognise the seizure by Soviet China . . . of over half of our national territory" and that "We can neither concur in the brutal enslavement of millions of compatriots". North Vietnamese Prime Minister Phạm Văn Đồng expressed bitterness after his Soviet and Chinese backers threatened to cut support if he did not agree to the peace terms; Dong had wanted to press home the Viet Minh's military advantage so they could lay claim to more territory at the negotiating table.

Under the accords, there was to be a period in which free civilian movement was allowed between the two zones, whereas military forces were compelled to relocate to their respective sides. All French Far East Expeditionary Corps and VNA forces in the north were to be evacuated south of the 17th parallel, while all Viet Minh fighters had to relocate to the north. The accords stipulated that civilians were to be given the opportunity to move to their preferred half of Vietnam. Article 14(d) of the accords stated that:

Any civilians residing in a district controlled by one party who wish to go and live in the zone assigned to the other party shall be permitted and helped to do so.

Article 14(d) allowed for a 300-day period of free movement between the two Vietnams, ending on May 18, 1955. The parties had given little thought to the logistics of the population resettlement during the negotiations at Geneva, and assumed the matter would be minor. Despite claiming that his northern compatriots had been "enslaved", Diem expected no more than 10,000 refugees. General Paul Ely, the French Commissioner-General of Indochina, expected that around 30,000 landlords and business executives would move south and proclaimed that he would take responsibility for transporting any Vietnamese who wanted to move to territory controlled by the French Union, such as South Vietnam. French Prime Minister Pierre Mendès France and his government had planned to provide aid for around 50,000 displaced persons. Mendes-France was sure that the FFEEC would be able to handle the work all by itself. The Americans saw the period as an opportunity to weaken the communist north.

== Evacuation ==
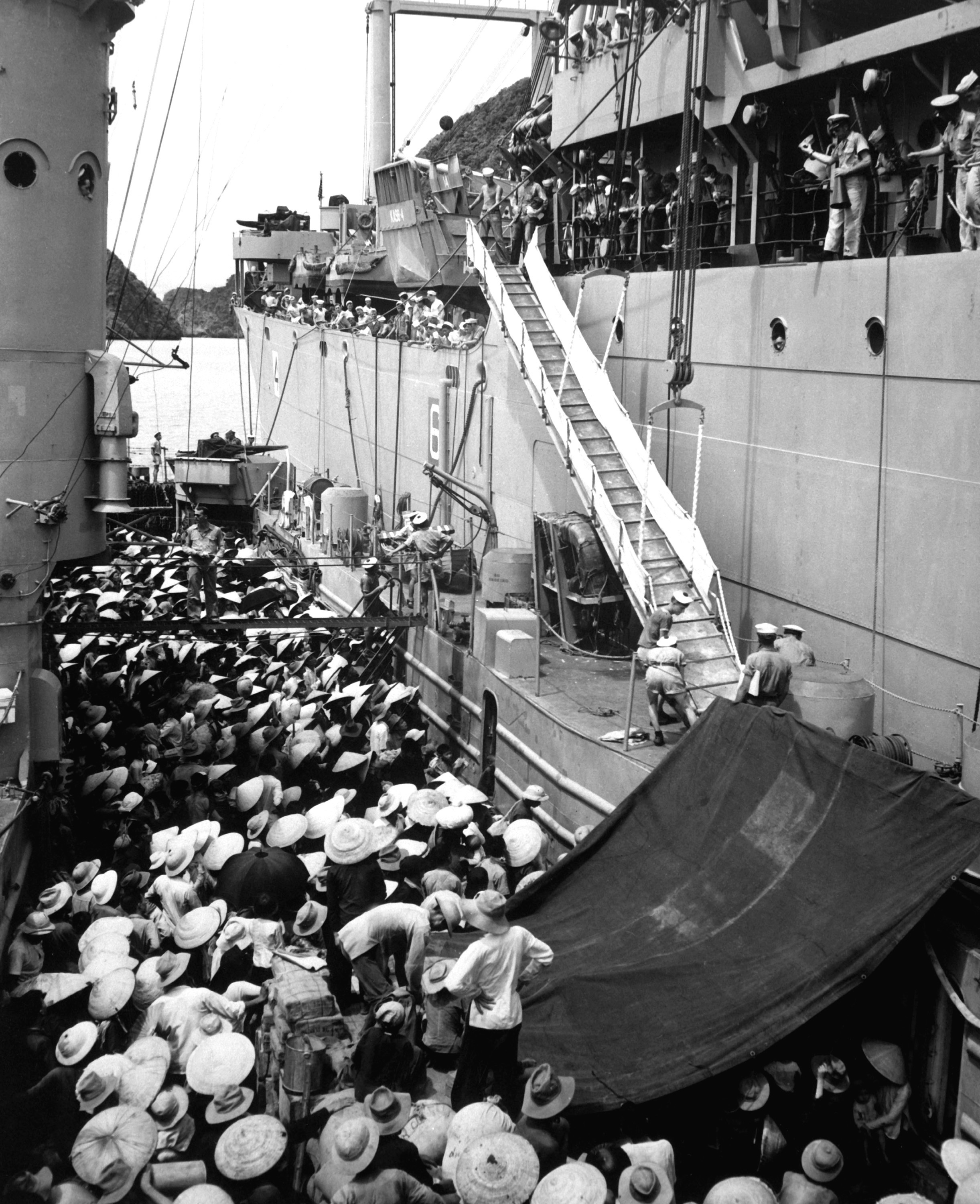
North Vietnamese refugees move from a French landing ship to the USS Montague during Operation Passage to Freedom in August 1954.

The predictions made by Diem and Ely were extremely inaccurate. There had been heavy fighting in northern Vietnam, where the Vietminh were at their strongest, and many people had been forced to abandon their homes. Although French charities had been operating in the north, the refugee camps were disorganised and were able to provide little more than shelter. As a result, there was a great number of northerners who wanted to leave and start a new life in the south.

The French started their evacuation with their pre-conceived notion that few would want to head south. As knowledge of the migration program spread through the communist-controlled north, thousands of predominantly northern Catholic asylum-seekers descended on the capital Hanoi and the port of Haiphong, both of which were still in French control. This led to anarchy and confusion as the emigrants fought over limited shelter, food, medicine and places on the ships and planes that were bound for the south. By early August, there were over 200,000 evacuees waiting in Hanoi and Haiphong. Initially the ad hoc camps had insufficient sanitation and water quality control, leading to the possibility of outbreaks of disease. Some American representatives said that they were the worst conditions they had seen, with open sewers of human waste frequented by rodents, vermin and flies a common sight. The conditions continued to be poor and chaotic after the evacuation got into full swing, and did not improve significantly for a month. There was no organization infrastructure as far as registration or medical records and immunization of the waiting evacuees. The communists thus sent their propaganda activists through the camps and said that the lack of organisation proved that life for prospective refugees would be even worse in the south, where they would be completely under the control of South Vietnam.

The French Navy and Air Force had been depleted during World War II. They were unable to deal with the unexpectedly large number of refugees. This was exacerbated by their unwillingness to allow civilian evacuees to travel on trains from outlying districts to Hanoi and Haiphong, as their priority was evacuating their military personnel and equipment. France asked Washington for assistance, so the US Department of Defense ordered the US Navy to mobilise an evacuation task force.

The American government saw the evacuation as an opportunity to weaken the communists by providing for and thereby winning the loyalty of the refugees to the anti-communist cause. The United States Operation Mission proposed that aside from helping to evacuate refugees to the south and thereby draining the communist population base, the Americans should provide free healthcare, shelter, food and clothing in order to help the anti-communists win the fidelity of their compatriots. Another benefit of participating in the evacuation was that American personnel would be on the ground in North Vietnam, allowing them to gather intelligence on communist activities.

Accordingly, Task Force 90 (CTF-90) was inaugurated under the command of Rear Admiral Lorenzo Sabin. US servicemen renovated and transformed cargo vessels and tank carriers to house the thousands of Vietnamese who would be evacuated in them. The repairs were frequently done en route to Haiphong from their bases at Subic Bay in the Philippines. Sabin had no prior involvement in humanitarian matters, and he and his staff prepared Operation Order 2–54—the 114-page policy framework for the operation—in the space of a week during their sea voyage from Japan to Vietnam.

The first US vessel to participate in the mass evacuation was the Menard, which left Haiphong on August 17. It carried 1,924 refugees for a 1,600 kilometre, three-day journey to the southern capital. By this time, there were already 132,000 people registered at the waiting areas, although very few had any identification. As a result, there would be more work to be done in identifying their needs once they arrived in the south. The Montrose followed on the next day, with 2,100 passengers. Both were originally built as attack transport vessels. In August, the US policy was liberalised so that Vietnamese and French military personnel could also be evacuated at the discretion of CTF-90 and the Chief Military Assistance Advisory Group (CHMAAG). To cope with the rising volume of southbound sea transport, CHMAAG established a refugee debarkation site at Vũng Tàu, a coastal port at the entrance of the Saigon River. This site relieved congestion in the Saigon refugee camps and decreased the traffic bottlenecks along the river. A setback occurred when a typhoon struck the Haiphong area, destroying almost half of the refugee staging area. Despite the problems, by September 3, the US Navy had evacuated 47,000 northerners after only two weeks of operations. The high rate of evacuation caused the South Vietnamese government to order that only one shipment of at most 2,500 passengers was to arrive in Saigon or Vũng Tàu per day, until September 25. The population pressure in the south was eased as incoming numbers fell due to Viet Minh propaganda campaigns and forcible detention, combined with the rice harvesting season, which had prompted some to delay their departure. Some were even waiting to finish all their business deals before moving in the Lunar New Year. On October 10, the Viet Minh were given full control of Hanoi, closing off one point of evacuation for those who wanted out. Some also decided to stay behind and see how the Viet Minh would treat the inhabitants of Hanoi before making a decision on whether to leave their ancestral lands. On October 20, the French authorities that were still in control of the ports decided to waive docking fees on US vessels engaged in the evacuation. Because of the high demand, the naval vessels had to travel quickly; one ship completed one round trip in a record of only six days. The record for the most passengers taken in one journey was set by the USS General Black, which sailed on October 29 with 5,224 Vietnamese aboard. In November, the evacuation was further hampered by another typhoon, while the entire crew of one American vessel were struck down by a scabies outbreak. In December, because of Viet Minh obstruction, which prevented people from rural and regional areas from travelling to Hanoi and Haiphong to emigrate, the French Navy sent ships to hover just off the coast near the regional town of Vinh to evacuate refugees.

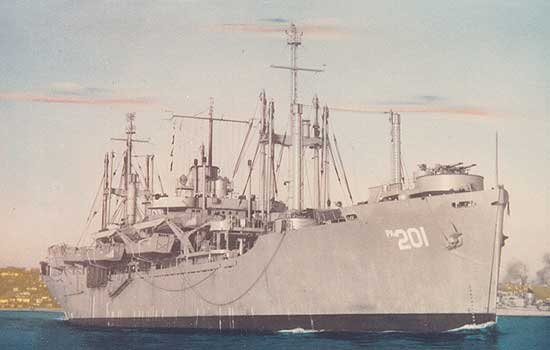
USS Menard, the first American ship to participate in the naval evacuation

According to COMIGAL, the South Vietnamese government agency responsible for the migration, French aircraft made 4,280 trips, carrying a total of 213,635 refugees. A total of 555,037 passengers were recorded on 505 sea trips. The French Navy accounted for the vast majority of the naval evacuees, with 388 voyages, while the US Navy made 109. British, Taiwanese and Polish ships made two, two and four journeys respectively. The official figures reported that a total of 768,672 people had migrated under military supervision. Of this number around 190,000 were French and Saigon soldiers and returned prisoners; some 43,000 were military dependents, "15,000–25,000 Nung tribesmen who were military auxiliaries, between 25,000 and 40,000 French citizens, and about 45,000 Chinese residents." It also included several thousand people who had worked for the French and Vietnamese administrations in the North. The official figures recorded that more than 109,000 people journeyed into the south by their own means, some arriving outside the 300-day period. These people typically crossed the river that divided the zones on makeshift rafts, sailed on improvised watercraft into a southern port, or trekked through Laos. As of 1957, the South Vietnamese government claimed a total of 928,152 refugees, of whom 98.3% were ethnic Vietnamese. The 1957 report said that 85% were engaged in farming or fishing for their livelihood and 85% were Catholics, while the remainder were Buddhists or Protestants. However, an October 1955 government report claimed that 76.3% were Catholics, 23.5% were Buddhists and 0.2% Protestants. In 1959, however, the head of COMIGAL, Bui Van Luong, admitted that the actual number of refugees could have been as low as 600,000. The official data excluded approximately 120,000 anti-communist military personnel and claimed that only 4,358 people moved north, though no historians consider this number credible. The northward migration was attributed to itinerant workers from rubber plantations who returned north for family reasons.

An independent study by the French historian Bernard B. Fall determined that the US Navy transported around 310,000 refugees. The French were credited with around 214,000 airlifted refugees, 270,000 seaborne refugees and 120,000 and 80,000 Vietnamese and French military evacuees respectively. During the US Navy voyages, 54 people died on board, and 111 babies were born. Fall felt than some fell overboard meaning the number of deaths fell far short of the truth. Fall believed that of the 109,000 refugees who went south by their own means, a large number hitchhiked on southbound French transport vessels that were not related to the migration operation. Fall felt that the figures were likely to have been overestimated, due to immigration fraud. Some refugees would travel south and register themselves, before smuggling themselves onto vessels returning north for another shipment of humans. They would then return south and re-register to claim another aid package. Likewise, with instances of entire villages moving south, the authorities frequently did not explicitly count the number of villagers, but simply took the word of the village leaders. The chiefs would often inflate the population figures to claim more aid rations. The mass exodus did not disrupt the north largely because whole villages often emigrated, instead of half a village moving and leaving the remainder of the community in disarray. Fall felt that around 120,000 Viet Minh troops and their dependents went north. Most of these evacuations were attributed to Viet Minh military strategy, with some being ordered to stay behind in readiness for future guerrilla activities. The northward movement was facilitated by vessels leaving from assembly areas at Qui Nhơn and Cà Mau at the southernmost extremity of Vietnam. The voyages to North Vietnam were provided by empty French ships heading back north to fetch more southbound anti-communists, as well vessels from communist nations such as Poland. The Viet Minh also actively cultivated the Montagnard indigenous people of Vietnam, whose land in the Central Highlands was encroached upon by incoming northern settlers. The communists spread propaganda through broadcasts in tribal languages and infiltrated the highland areas. According to a study by the Michigan State University Group, some 6,000 tribespeople went north with the communists, accompanied by some Viet Minh who had adopted the indigenous culture.

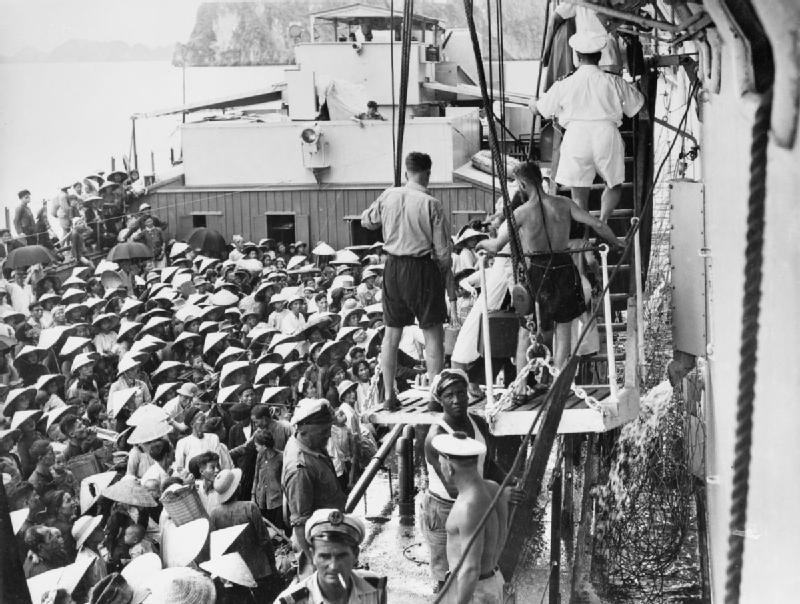
Refugees transfer from a French LCT landing craft to British carrier HMS Warrior at the port of Haiphong during the operation 4 September 1954

The largest numbers of Catholic refugees came from the two northern dioceses with the highest percentage of Catholics in Vietnam. These were Phát Diêm and Bùi Chu, mainly located in modern-day Ninh Bình and Nam Định Provinces respectively. The bishops of the dioceses had been strident opponents of the communists, and both had organised Catholic paramilitary groups that fought against the Viet Minh, which had long identified Catholics with colonial collaborationism. When the communists had gained the upper hand in the north, many Catholics had already begun making preparations to move to the south, where the communists were less influential, and large movements began immediately when news of the partition came through. After the defeat of French Union forces at Dien Bien Phu, French officers had evacuated their troops from Bui Chu and Phat Diem to reinforce the area between Hanoi and Haiphong which they still controlled, making it very easy for the communists to progress through the Catholic strongholds. The French withdrawal was not announced and was supposed to be secret, but the local church leadership found out quickly and the local Catholic community had already begun to move to the ports before end of talks in Geneva. By the time the accords were signed, 45,000 Catholic refugees were already waiting in Hanoi, Haiphong or Hải Dương. According to the records of the Catholic Church, over 70% of Catholics in Bui Chu and Phat Diem left, compared to around 50% in most other areas. The Catholic records claim that only a third of Hanoi Catholics left, and that around 80% of all clergy left. In all areas, a higher proportion of priests left than laypeople, which has been attributed to the communists inflicting heavier punishments on more prominent opposition figures, such as clerics. The departure rate was also lower in areas further removed from the coastal areas and departure ports; in Hưng Hóa, only 11.8% of Catholics were recorded by their diocese as have migrated. It has been speculated that the low rate of Hanoi residents choosing to depart may have been because the city was relatively untouched by the decade of fighting, and that the varying and high rate of departures among rural Catholics was due to the influence of the local clergy; priests in northern Vietnam were noted to be more theocratic and involved in civic decision-making. They used a variety of ways to persuade their disciples to migrate; some explained their belief that circumstances would be difficult for people who did not immigrate, some simply gave dogmatic reasons such as "God is not here any more", while others gave no reason at all and made declarations such as "We are leaving tomorrow" in the expectation that their followers would obey without question. Surveys on the immigrants suggested they were largely content to follow the recommendation of the local priest. In some areas, the bishop in charge of the diocese told Catholics to stay, but laypeople were more likely to leave or stay depending on the stance of the local priest with whom they had regular contact; in many cases, such as in Hanoi, a majority of priests ignored their bishop and left anyway.

In many cases, families left some members behind in the hope that they would retain land for the family, while there were reports that a minority of Catholics with links to the communists decided to stay willingly.

The US provided emergency food, medical care, clothing and shelter at reception centres in Saigon and elsewhere in the south. American sources donating through the United States Operations Mission (USOM) were responsible for 97% of the aid. The USOM sent public health professionals to help with sanitation in an attempt to prevent the spread of disease. Doctors and nurses were sent to help train local workers in healthcare procedures, so that they would eventually be able to take care of the medical needs refugees. In order of contributions to the aid efforts, the US were followed by France, United Kingdom, Australia, West Germany, New Zealand and the Netherlands. Australian sent farming equipment and accompanying technical instructors under the Colombo Plan.

With most of the refugees being Catholic, the voluntary agencies most prominent in helping the US and French governments with humanitarian relief efforts were Catholic. The National Catholic Welfare Conference and Catholic Relief Services contributed over US$35 million ($420 million as of 2025) and sent hundreds of aid workers to South Vietnam. US clerics such as Joseph Harnett spent more than a year supervising the establishment of humanitarian and religious projects in Saigon. These included the establishment and maintenance of orphanages, hospitals, schools and churches. Harnett's volunteers fed rice and warm milk to 100,000 refugees on a daily basis. Tens of thousands of blankets donated by the American Catholic organisations served as beds, makeshift roofs against monsoonal downpours and as temporary walls in mass housing facilities. The United Nations Children's Fund contributed technical assistance and helped to distribute merchandise, foodstuffs and various other gifts.

== Role of propaganda campaigns ==
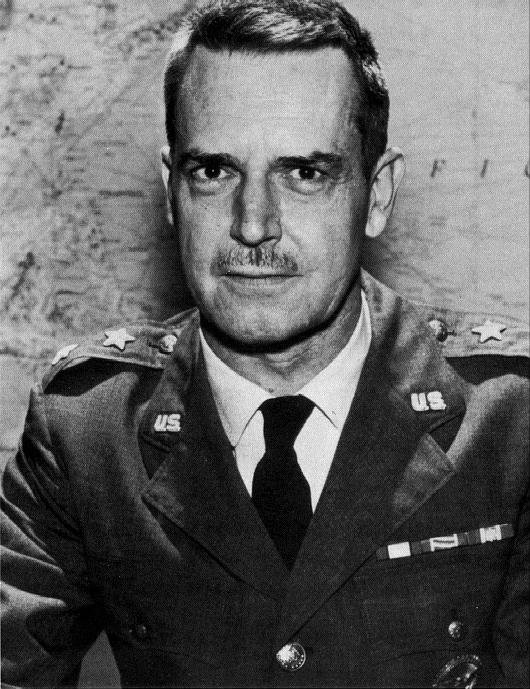
Colonel Edward Lansdale

The US ran a propaganda campaign through the Central Intelligence Agency (CIA) to enhance the size of the southward exodus. The program was directed by Colonel Edward Lansdale, who masqueraded as the assistant US air attaché in Saigon while leading a covert group that specialised in psychological warfare. Lansdale had advised Diem that it was imperative to maximise the population in the south in preparation for the national reunification elections. When Diem noted the limited ability of the south to absorb refugees, Lansdale assured him that the US would bear the burden. Diem thus authorised Lansdale to launch the propaganda campaign. According to the historian Seth Jacobs, the campaign "ranked with the most audacious enterprises in the history of covert action". Lansdale recollected that "U.S. officials wanted to make sure that as many persons as possible, particularly the strongly anti-communist Catholics, relocated in the South". While many Diem supporters claimed that the mass exodus was proof of the popularity of Diem and the people's hatred of communism, the CIA operative Chester Cooper said "the vast movement of Catholics to South Vietnam was not spontaneous". However, while Lansdale is often credited by historians—usually those critical of his influence—with the large exodus of refugees due to superstition, he rejected the notion that his campaign had much effect on popular sentiment, saying in later years: "People don’t just pull up their roots and transplant themselves because of slogans. They honestly feared what might happen to them, and their emotion was strong enough to overcome their attachment to their land, their homes, and their ancestral graves. So the initiative was very much theirs—and we mainly made the transportation possible." Some northerners who stayed behind and were interviewed half a century later said that they had not come across any pro-migration propaganda and said that their decisions were based on discussions with fellow locals. They said that concerns over the possible effects of communist rule were discussed among themselves independent of outside information.

Lansdale employed a variety of stunts to encourage more northerners to move south. South Vietnamese soldiers in civilian clothing infiltrated the north, spreading rumours of impending doom. One story was that the communists had a deal with Vietnam's traditional enemy China, allowing two communist Chinese divisions to invade the north. The story reported that the Chinese were raping and pillaging with the tacit approval of the communists. Lansdale hired counterfeiters to produce bogus Viet Minh leaflets on how to behave under communist rule, advising them to create a list of their material possessions, so that the communists would be able to confiscate them more easily, thereby fomenting peasant discontent.

Lansdale's men forged documents allegedly issued by the Vietminh that promised to seize all private property. He claimed that "The day following distribution of these leatlets, refugee registration tripled". The Central Evacuation Committee in Haiphong, an American-funded group, issued pamphlets claiming that in South Vietnam, "the cost of living is three times less", and that there would be welfare payments and free ricelands, the latter two of which were false. They also said that "By remaining in the North you will experience famine and will damn your souls. Set out now, brothers and sisters!" The most inflammatory rumour spread by agents of the CIA was that Washington would launch an attack to liberate the north when all anti-communists had fled south. It claimed that the Americans would use atomic bombs and that the only way of avoiding death in a nuclear holocaust was to move south. Lansdale had CIA artists create pamphlets showing three mushroom clouds superimposed on a map of Hanoi, and CIA assets were infiltrated into North Vietnam and disseminated the pamphlets. Lansdale's saboteurs also poured sugar into the petrol tanks of Viet Minh vehicles. Soothsayers were bribed to predict disaster under communism, and prosperity for those who went south.

Lansdale's campaign focused on northern Catholics, who were known for their strongly anti-communist tendencies. His staff printed tens of thousands of pamphlets with slogans such as "Christ has gone south" and "the Virgin Mary has departed from the North", alleging anti-Catholic persecution under Ho Chi Minh. Posters depicting communists closing a cathedral and forcing the congregation to pray in front of Ho, adorned with a caption "make your choice", were pasted around Hanoi and Haiphong. Diem himself went to Hanoi several times in 1954 while the French were still garrisoned there to encourage Catholics to move, portraying himself as a savior of Catholics. The campaign resonated with northern Catholic priests, who told their disciples that Ho would end freedom of worship, that sacraments would no longer be given and that anyone who stayed behind would endanger their souls. A survey of refugees some five decades later confirmed that they felt their interests would be best served under a Catholic leader and that Diem had substantial personal appeal due to his religion. Some have argued that the Catholics would have left regardless of Lansdale's activities, as they had first-hand experiences of their priests and co-religionists being captured, brutally beaten, starved, interrogated, tortured and eventually executed for resisting the communist revolution.

The "Psywar theory" itself was not advanced by Lansdale and his supporters, but by Vietnamese communist officials. They claimed that Catholics were forced and seduced to immigrate by American imperialists and Ngô Đình Diệm clique. In fact, propaganda by Lansdale did not have much influence on Catholics' decision to move. The reasons why some Catholics moved to the South had little or nothing to do with Catholicism. They could be a diversity of concerns and motives just like about 25% of the migrants who were non-Catholic.

Regardless of the impact of the propaganda campaigns, the Catholic immigrants helped to strengthen Diem's support base. Before the partition, most of Vietnam's Catholic population lived in the north. After the borders were sealed, the majority were now under Diem's rule. The Catholics implicitly trusted Diem due to their common faith and were a source of loyal political support. One of Diem's main objections to the Geneva Accords—which the State of Vietnam refused to sign—was that it deprived him of the Catholic regions of North Vietnam, and he had unsuccessfully called for Bui Chu and Phat Diem to be omitted from the communist zone. With entire Catholic provinces moving south en masse, in 1956 the Diocese of Saigon had more Catholics than Paris and Rome. Of Vietnam's 1.45 million Catholics, over a million lived in the south, 55% of whom were northern refugees. Prior to this, only 520,000 Catholics lived in the Dioceses of Saigon and Huế combined. Lansdale employed the refugee movements as a cover for paramilitary activities from his Saigon Military Mission.

Apart from anti-communist campaigning, economics was another factor in moving south. The US gave handouts of US$89 (equivalent to $1,067 in 2025) for each refugee who moved; the per capita income in Vietnam at the time was only $85 per year (equivalent to $1,019 in 2025). Others have pointed to natural geographic factors unrelated to and uncontrollable by political regimes. They point to the fact that the land in the south was seen as being more productive, and memories of the Great Vietnamese Famine of 1945, which killed millions in the north, as reasons independent of politics that motivated migrants. In the mid-1950s, northern Vietnam again suffered food shortages, and some migrants have cited food security as motive for relocation. Adding to this was a general perception that Saigon was a more modern city with more economic vibrancy. Earlier in the 20th century, there had also been instances of campaigns by Catholics to encourage southerly migration to exploit underdeveloped land in the south, so it was not a new concept for them.

The Viet Minh engaged in counter-propaganda campaigns in an attempt to deter the exodus from the north. They moved through the neighbourhoods of Hanoi and Haiphong on a daily basis, passing out their pamphlets. Evacuees reported being ridiculed by the Viet Minh, who claimed that they would be sadistically tortured before being killed by the French and American authorities in Haiphong. The communists depicted the personnel of Task Force 90 as cannibals who would eat their babies, predicting disaster in the jungles, beaches and mountains of South Vietnam. They further said that the Americans would throw them overboard to drown in the ocean. The Viet Minh boasted to the emigrants that it was a high and futile risk, asserting that the 1956 reunification elections would result in a decisive communist victory. The communist efforts were helped by the fact that many French or State of Vietnam offices in the north evacuated their personnel and sold or otherwise left behind their printing facilities, many of which fell into Viet Minh hands.

== Communist prevention of emigration ==
Along with counter-propaganda, the Viet Minh also sought to detain or otherwise prevent would-be refugees from leaving. As the American and French military personnel were only present in the major cities and at air bases and on the waterfront, the communists tried to stop people from trying to leave through a military presence in the ruralside to interdict the flow of would-be refugees. According to Robert F. Turner and the Hoover Institution, as many as 2 million more might have left had it not been for the presence of Viet Minh soldiers, who according to them frequently arrested, brutally beat and occasionally killed those who refused to turn back.

The communists were most effective in Nghệ An and Thanh Hóa Provinces, which they had long controlled; only 20% of Catholics in Thanh Hóa migrated. In parts of the Red River Delta, ferry services and other water traffic were shut down so that refugees would not be able to travel to Haiphong. In some cases there were reports of thousands-strong groups of refugees being forced back by similar numbers of communist cadres with rifles with fixed bayonets. As a result, many refugees headed directly for the nearest coastal point to wait for passing vessels. In one sweep of the coast near the Catholic stronghold of Phát Diêm, the French Navy picked up 42,000 stranded refugees in two days. The VNA also swept the area in late 1954 for two days, picking up several thousand refugees, but increasing communist attacks forced them to stop. In some rural coastal areas where it was common for refugees to converge before boarding vessels to connect to the long-distance naval vessels taking them south, the Viet Minh installed barbed wire, booby traps, landmines, artillery, mortars, machine gun nests and even flamethrowers on the beaches to deter prospective immigrants. Sometimes grenades were thrown by the Viet Minh at refugees gathered on the beaches.

They prohibited mass gatherings in an attempt to stop entire villages or other large groups of people from emigrating together, and also isolated people who sold their water buffalo and other belongings, as this was a clear sign that they intended to end their farming. Both the Americans and the South Vietnamese lodged complaints to the International Control Commission about the violations of the Geneva Accords, but little action was taken. The United Nations refused to take sides. According to B. S. M. Murti, the Indian representative on the ICC, the communists did not try to stop the refugees at first, but increased their efforts over time as it became clearer that large proportions of the population wanted to emigrate.

== Media and public relations ==
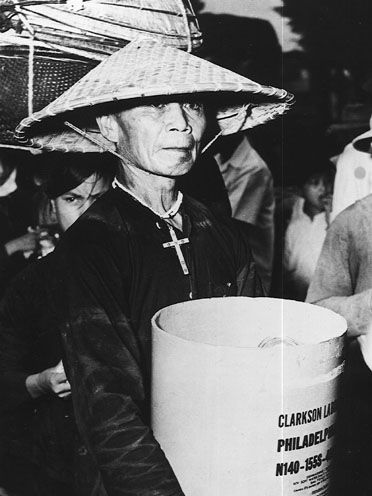
A North Vietnamese Catholic evacuee. Catholics represented approximately 85% of the refugees in South Vietnam.

The United States reaped substantial public relations benefits from the mass exodus, which was used to depict the allure of the "free world". This was enhanced by the comparatively negligible number of people who voluntarily moved into the communist north. The event generated unprecedented press coverage of Vietnam. Initially however, the press coverage was scant, and Admiral Sabin bemoaned the lack of promotional work done by the US Navy to publicise the evacuation among the American media. At one point, a journalist from the Associated Press travelled from Manila to Haiphong, but was ordered back by superiors on the grounds that Americans were not interested in the subject.

However, over time, the media interest grew. Many prominent news agencies sent highly decorated reporters to cover the event. The New York Times dispatched Tillman and Peggy Durdin, while the New York Herald Tribune sent the Pulitzer Prize-winning war reporters Marguerite Higgins and Homer Bigart. Future US embassy official John Mecklin covered the event for Time Life. The press reports presented highly laudatory and emotional accounts of the mass exodus of Vietnamese away from the communist north. Time Life called the mass migration "a tragedy of almost nightmarish proportions ... Many [refugees] went without food or water or medicine for days, sustained only by the faith in their heart."

In the American Catholic press, the migration was given front-page coverage in diocesan newspapers. The accounts were often sensationalist, demonizing the communist Viet Minh as religious persecutors who committed barbaric atrocities against Catholics. Our Sunday Visitor called the "persecution" in Vietnam "the worst in history", alleging that the Viet Minh engaged in "child murder and cannibalism". San Francisco's Monitor told of a priest whom the Viet Minh "beat with guns until insensible and then buried alive in a ditch". Newark, Ohio's The Advocate posted an editorial cartoon titled "Let Our People Go!", depicting mobs of Vietnamese refugees attempting to break through a blood-laced fence of barbed wire. Milwaukee's Catholic Herald Citizen described two priests who had allegedly been chained together and "suffered atrocious and endless agony". Other papers depicted the Viet Minh blowing up churches, torturing children and gunning down elderly Catholics. One paper proclaimed that "the people of Vietnam became a crucified people and their homeland a national Golgotha". The Catholic media also ran stories about Buddhist refugees who converted, hailing it as proof of their religion's superiority.

== Social integration ==
The mass influx of refugees presented various social issues for South Vietnam. The new arrivals needed to be integrated into society with jobs and housing, as long periods in tents and temporary housing would sap morale and possibly foster pro-communist sympathies. Diem had to devise programs to ease his new citizens into the economic system.

Diem appointed Bui Van Luong—a family friend and devout Catholic—as the head of COMIGAL, the government resettlement agency. COMIGAL worked in cooperation with the USOM, the non-military wing of the American presence and the Military Assistance Advisory Group. Although COMIGAL was purely dedicated to refugee issues, there was a constant turnover of public servants through their staff, and the benefits of continuity did not materialize. After only a few months in the job, Luong was replaced by Pham Van Huyen on December 7, 1954. COMIGAL were supplemented by American Catholic aid agencies and an advisory group from Michigan State University, where Diem had stayed while in self-imposed exile in the early 1950s. The Vatican did not send aid, but urged that Catholics worldwide do so. There were three phases in the resettlement program. With more than 4,000 new arrivals per day, the northerners were housed in Saigon and Vũng Tàu in 42 makeshift reception centers. These consisted of existing schools, vacated French barracks, churches and tent cities on the grounds of Tan Son Nhut Air Base and Phú Thọ Racecourse. These could not be used indefinitely as the grounds needed to be used for their preexisting purpose, and furthermore, such ad hoc areas were vulnerable to outbreaks of fire and disease.

The refugees needed buildings such as schools, hospitals, warehouses, places of worship were built for them. As part of the second phase, temporary villages were built and by mid-1955, most of the one million refugees were living in rows of temporary housing settlements, mostly near highways leading out of Saigon, in provinces adjacent to the capital. The largest concentration of housing in this second stage was located to the north of the capital. Only a minority could be sent to the fertile Mekong Delta, as the area was already overcrowded. It was also restive due to the presence of militant religious sects, so most of the military evacuees were sent there.

Overcrowding was a serious problem in many of the ad hoc secondary camps set up in the Saigon region, and led to public health issues due to poor sanitation practices stemming from the lack of flushing toilets. The Biên Hòa region on the northeastern outskirts of Saigon was scheduled to have a capacity of 100,000 refugees, but this was soon exceeded. In the Ho Nai camp near Bien Hoa, which was supposed to hold only 10,000 refugees, more than 41,000 were present by the end of 1954. The area surrounding Thủ Dầu Một north of the southern capital had initially been allocated a quota of 20,000 even though there was no rice paddies in the area. The area near Tây Ninh was to accommodate 30,000 people, although the locals thought that 100,000 could fit in. Some large Catholic settlements such as Thủ Đức, Bình Thạnh and Gò Vấp on the outskirts of Saigon have now been subsumed by urban sprawl and are now districts of the city. Because of the excessive number of inhabitants, the infrastructure at many camps could not cope and the promises made to the refugees were not kept. American military doctors travelled around the south in groups of three, and because of the paucity of health professionals, saw around 150–450 patients per day. They were also hampered by customs law, which only allowed charities to bring medicine into the country without taxation. This forced them to turn to charitable organisations as a conduit, creating another layer of bureaucracy. This was exacerbated by the fact that some corrupt Vietnamese officials pocketed the medical aid.

The organisational ability of the government agencies charged with overseeing the integration of the refugees into society was frequently criticised by American officials. In many cases, the individual officials simply made their own decisions and the goal of resettling the northerners without disruption to the existing local economy or social structure was not achieved. In other cases, the northern Catholics formed their own committees and settled and built on areas as they saw fit. By the end of September, the shortage of funds and equipment had eased, but their distribution was not organised or coordinated effectively. At the same time, some Viet Minh cadres who stayed in the south after the partition pretended to be refugees and stirred up trouble inside the camps. Aside from disruption by communists, other non-communist movements such as the Việt Nam Quốc Dân Đảng were strong in areas of central Vietnam, were opponents of Diem and some of them were military personnel. This sometimes caused hindrance in civilian-military cooperation in the resettlement program, as some of Diem's public servants were suspicious of the military's reliability as a working partner.

At the time, much of the rural ricelands had been abandoned due to war and lay fallow. The Americans pressured Diem to assume control of such lands and distribute it to the new settlers and to allow them to start their new lives and ease the overcrowding in the camps, but no action was taken in 1954. At the time, there was a severe wastage of personnel due to the placement of refugees in land that was inappropriate to them. Vietnamese officials had resolved to place the settlers in land similar to their northern origins so that they could be productive, but bureaucratic difficulties hampered COMIGAL and no plan was produced. Throughout 1954, 60% of the new arrivals identified themselves as having an agrarian background, but only 20% of the total refugees were placed in arable farming areas, meaning that at least 40% of the northerners were in areas not appropriate for their skill set. There were also severe problems in finding and then distributing farming equipment to the northerners so that they could get to work and resuscitate the agricultural sector that was hindered by the war.

The next objective was to integrate the refugees into South Vietnamese society. At the time, there was a lack of arable land in secure areas. In early 1955, the Viet Minh still controlled much of the Mekong Delta, while other parts were controlled by the private armies of the Cao Đài and Hòa Hảo religious sects. The Bình Xuyên organised crime gang controlled the streets of Saigon, having purchased the operating license for the national police from Emperor Bảo Đại. The new arrivals could not be safely sent to the countryside until the Viet Minh had moved north and Diem had dispersed the sects and gangs. The urban areas were secured when the VNA defeated the Bình Xuyên in the Battle for Saigon in late April and early May. Lansdale managed to bribe many of the Hòa Hảo and Cao Đài military commanders to integrate into Diem's VNA, but some commanders fought on. It was not until early 1956 that the last Hoa Hao commander, Ba Cụt, was captured in an Army of the Republic of Vietnam campaign by General Dương Văn Minh. Ba was subsequently executed. This allowed COMIGAL to send expeditions to survey the rural land for settlement.

The third phase of the resettlement involved the dispersal of the new arrivals from the temporary villages in regions surrounding the capital and other large cities. The areas where the refugees had gone initially were over settled, notably Biên Hòa, where the population had doubled during the migration period. In contrast, two thirds of South Vietnamese provinces had taken less than 10,000 refugees, and some of these less than 1,000. In the crowded provinces there were fears of social unrest due to a shortage of work.

COMIGAL dispatched inspection teams throughout South Vietnam to identify areas that were suitable for accommodating the new arrivals according to their professional skills. This required a search for arable land for farmers, favourable coastal areas for fishing and areas near large population centres for industrially oriented arrivals. Having identified the relevant areas, COMIGAL would set up plans for settlement subprojects, sending proposals to the USOM or the French Technical and Economic Cooperation Bureau to gain approval and funding. The bureaucracy was relatively low, with most applications taking less than a fortnight for finalising paperwork and receiving approval. Each subproject was given a nine-month deadline for completion.

When suitable areas were found, groups of refugees usually numbering between one and three thousand were trucked to the site and began creating the new settlement. This involved digging wells, building roads and bridges, clearing forests, bushes and swamps and constructing fishing vessels. Village elections were held to select members for committees that would liaise with COMIGAL on behalf of the new settlement.

COMIGAL provided the settlers with agrarian implements, fertilisers and farm animals. By mid-1957, 319 villages had been built. Of these, 288 were for farmers and 26 for fishermen. The refugees settled predominantly in the Mekong Delta, where 207 villages were built. The most notable scheme in the area was the Cai San Agricultural Resettlement Project, based along a system of canals near Long Xuyên. Another 50 villages were created further north near the border with North Vietnam, while 62 were built in the central highlands. A 1955 government report claimed that only 2% of the land in the central highlands, mostly inhabited by indigenous tribes were being used for economic purposes, and it was seen as a key area for exploitation and building settlements to block the advance of communism. The area was seen as an important means of alleviating overcrowding, fuelling rapid economic development, and the government hoped that the presence of ethnic Vietnamese development would prompt the indigenous tribespeople to abandon their hunter-gatherer lifestyle, thus "guiding them on the path to civilization and progress, so that they might join the ranks of the State's founders and liberators". In the Central Highlands town of Buôn Ma Thuột, the local sawmill was inundated with lumber to build houses and much of the surrounding forest was cleared for settlements. In total, 92,443 housing units were constructed, serviced by 317 and 18 elementary and secondary schools respectively. 38,192 hectares of land were cleared and some 2.4 million tons of potassium sulfate fertiliser were distributed. At the end of 1957, Diem dissolved COMIGAL, declaring that its mission had been accomplished.

== Aftermath and criticism ==
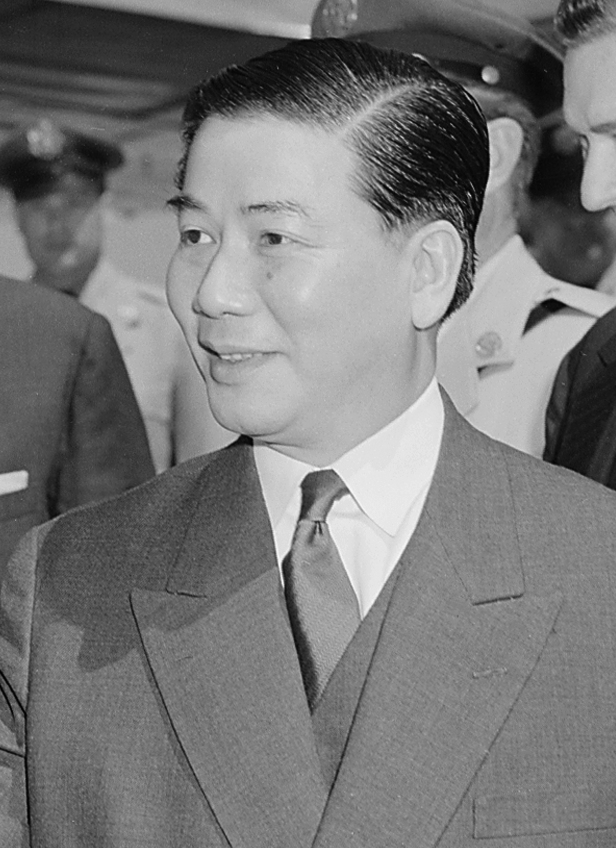
President Ngo Dinh Diem of South Vietnam

The program had some loose ends that manifested themselves later. Many refugees were not economically integrated and lived from government handouts. Critics noted that the refugees had become a special interest group that fostered resentment. The COMIGAL officials often decided not to split up refugees belonging to the same village, hoping to maintain social continuity. In some cases, Catholic priests refused to obey government directives to settle in certain areas. Many of the refugees also refused to relocate from the camps on the outskirts of the capital, wanting to live an urban lifestyle, and objecting to Diem's desire that they help developed inhospitable frontier territory where disease was more common and the economy less developed. On occasions, the reluctance to disperse away from Saigon resulted in protests outside Diem's residence. Many Catholic villages were effectively transplanted into southern territory. This was efficient in the short run but meant that they would never assimilate into southern society. They had little contact with the Buddhist majority and often held them in contempt, sometimes flying the Vatican flag instead of the national flag. Peter Hansen, an Australian Catholic priest and academic scholar of religion, has added that tensions between northern and southern Catholics were also present, due to issues of regionalism and local traditions. Hansen also said that northern Catholics took a more defensive attitude towards other religions than their southern co-religionists, and were more likely to see non-Catholics as a threat. He further noted that northern Catholics had a more theocratic outlook in that they were more willing to listen to the advice of priests on a wide range of issues, not only spiritual and ecclesiastical matters. These differences and the sense of segregation persist to the current day.

Diem, who had a reputation for heavily favouring Catholics, granted his new constituents a disproportionately high number of government and military posts on religious grounds rather than merit. The disproportionate number of northerners who occupied leadership posts also raised tensions among some regional-minded southerners who regarded them as intruders. He continued the French practice of defining Catholicism as a "religion" and Buddhism as an "association", which restricted their activities. This fostered a social divide between the new arrivals and their compatriots. While on a visit to Saigon in 1955, the British journalist and novelist Graham Greene reported that Diem's religious favouritism "may well leave his tolerant country a legacy of anti-Catholicism". In 1963, simmering discontent over Diem's religious bias exploded into mass civil unrest during the Buddhist crisis. After the Buddhist flag was prohibited from public display for the Vesak celebrations commemorating the birth of Gautama Buddha, Diem's forces opened fire and killed nine protesters. As demonstrations continued through the summer, the Army of the Republic of Vietnam Special Forces ransacked pagodas across the country, killing hundreds and brutally beating, arresting and jailing thousands of Buddhists. The tension culminated in Diem being overthrown and assassinated in a November coup.

The indigenous population in the central highlands complained bitterly about the settlement of ethnic Vietnamese Catholics in their regions. As a result of their discontent with the southern government, communists in the highlands found it easier to win them over.

About 25% of the migrants were non-Catholic and a number of Catholics who moved to the South did not do so because of their religion. Northern Catholic émigrés actually brought complex challenges to the Church in South Vietnam, and Ngô Đình Diệm also did not resettle northern Catholics in and around Sài Gòn as a deliberate and strategic policy. As Vietnamese Catholics were far from monolithic, and were not in any way unified in their political stances, it is a myth to conflate "Catholic refugees with all Catholics, with all refugees or with staunch supporters of Ngô Đình Diệm". The dispersed resettlements of Catholic refugees suggests that "being a refugee or being Catholic did not guarantee the president’s favour." In reality, the Personalist Revolution under Diệm's regime promoted religious freedom and diversity to oppose communism's atheism. However, this framework itself ultimately enabled Buddhist activists to threaten the state that supported their religious liberty. Catholics in South Vietnam, including Northerner refugees, continued in a significant variety of humanitarian and political activities during the later periods.
