= Lorenzo Sabin =

United States Navy vice admiral (1899–1988)

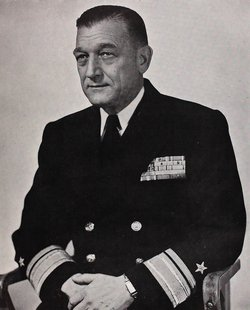
Vice Admiral Lorenzo S. Sabin

Lorenzo Sherwood Sabin, Jr. (1899–1988) was a career naval officer who rose to become a Vice Admiral and NATO’s Chief of Staff to the Supreme Allied Commander, Atlantic. He served in World War I, World War II, and the Korean Conflict, led major humanitarian efforts in Vietnam and China, and was flag officer for 11 different billets.

== Early life ==
Sabin grew up in Dallas, Texas, and graduated in 1917 from the Terrill School for Boys, which later became the St. Mark's School of Texas. He then attended the U.S. Naval Academy. His college yearbook noted that Sabin had "all the inherent qualities of a Texan" and "a determination that will carry him a long way on the road ahead".

== World War I and early career ==
During World War I, Sabin served as a cadet on the battleship Maine with the Atlantic Fleet. He graduated from the Naval Academy in 1921.

In 1930, he was trained in ordnance engineering at the U.S. Navy Postgraduate School.

== World War II ==
Sabin was present at the Attack on Pearl Harbor. At the time, he was serving as a staff gunnery officer on the USS Maryland, which was anchored on Battleship Row.

Sabin worked extensively with amphibious assault vessels during much of the war. For example, he led the first squadron of these vessels from the U.S to North Africa. And then, in July 1943, he was Commander of Landing Groups to Tunisia (Operation Torch) and Salerno (Operation Avalanche) and the Invasion of Sicily (Operation Husky). Afterwards, he commanded all Navy units at Lutica. For these efforts, Sabin was awarded the Navy’s Legion of Merit.

On D Day, June 6, 1944, Sabin was commander of Assault Convoy, Force 0, on the attack on Normandy. In particular, he commanded the Gunfire Support, Eleventh Amphibious Force, which was a convoy of more than 250 small craft that he had organized and trained. Under severe enemy fire, the convoy successfully landed onto Omaha Beach. Afterwards, he was in charge of the establishment of a Naval Base on the Normandy Coast and the unloading of all ships and craft in his assigned area. For these two leadership efforts, Sabin was awarded a Gold Star in lieu of a second Legion of Merit. In addition, Sabin was awarded Britain's Distinguished Service Order and the French Croix de Guerre with Gold Star.

== Post War Activity ==
Sabin was promoted to Rear Admiral and Flag officer in 1948.

During the Korean Conflict, Sabin served on the joint staff of Gen. Mark W. Clark, Commander in Chief of the U.S. Army Forces Far East. During that time, Sabin's flagship was the USS Eldorado. In 1954, Sabin received the Army Distinguished Service Medal and the Order of Military Merit (South Korea).

Sabin played crucial organizational roles in at least two significant humanitarian operations. In 1954-55’s Operation Passage to Freedom, Sabin led Task Force 90, the naval evacuation of 310,000 people, 7600 vehicles, and 66,000 tons of U.S.-origin military equipment from Communist-controlled North Vietnam to French-backed South Vietnam; these people included Vietnamese civilians and soldiers as well as non-Vietnamese members of the French army. For this service, he received a Navy Distinguished Service Medal, a Presidential Citation from Vietnamese President Ngo Dinh Diem and the French Legion of Honor.

A few weeks after the Vietnamese evacuation, Sabin and his crew traveled aboard his flagship, the USS Estes, to the Dachen Islands and became involved in the First Taiwan Strait Crisis. A few days before the invasion of the islands by the People’s Liberation Army, Sabin led the 5-day, around-the-clock evacuation of 14,500 Chinese nationals, 10,000 Chinese servicemen, 4000 guerilla fighters, and 40,000 tons of material.

In 1955-56, Sabin served as Commandant of the Potomac River Naval Command and Superintendent of the Naval Gun Factory in Washington, D.C. For these efforts, he received another Navy Distinguished Service Medal.

In 1956, Sabin was promoted to Vice Admiral.

Between 1957 and 1961, Sabin served as Chief of Staff to NATO’s Supreme Allied Commander Atlantic. For this effort, he received a Second Gold Star in lieu of a third award of the Navy Distinguished Service Medal.

Vice Admiral Sabin retired from active service in 1961.
