= Ed Beard =

Edward T. "Red" Beard, (c. 1828-November 11, 1873) was a gambler and saloon keeper of the Old West.

== Biography ==
Beard is the son of the man who first settled Beardstown, Illinois. Originally from Illinois, Beard settled in Virginia, and was for a period a man of wealth, having married well. In 1861 at the outbreak of the Civil War, Beard promptly left his life behind and moved west. Traveling through California, Oregon and Colorado he developed a nasty reputation as being good with a gun, and having a bad temper.

By 1873 he had settled in Delano, Kansas, then a bustling town across the Arkansas River from Wichita, Kansas. He opened a successful saloon which for a time prospered. On October 27, 1873, he became angry with a prostitute who was in his saloon, but who worked across the street at the saloon owned by "Rowdy Joe" Lowe. He chased the girl outside, shooting at her. After chasing her across the street, still shooting, they entered the Lowe Saloon, where he accidentally shot and wounded a patron and another girl. Lowe opened fire, wounding Beard, who died on November 11.
