= Edward Hanson =

U.S. Navy Vice admiral and Governor of American Samoa

Edward William Hanson
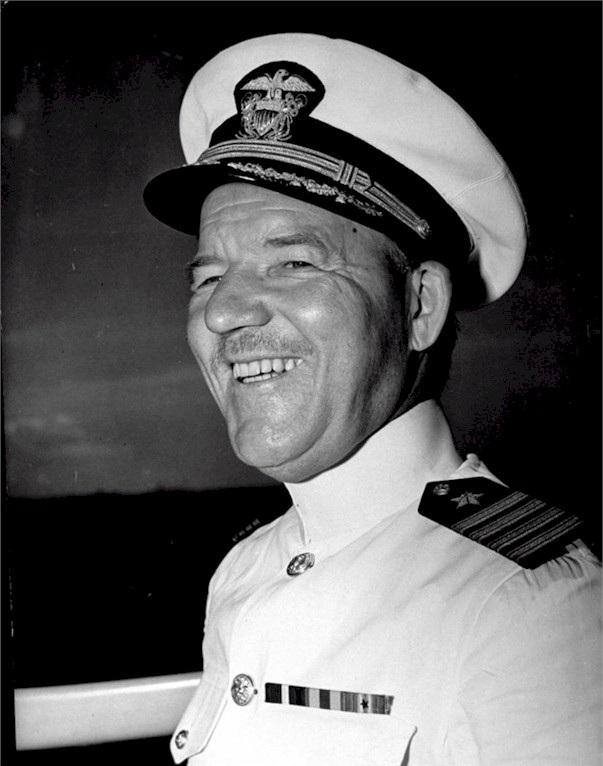

Governor of American Samoa
- In office June 26, 1938 – July 30, 1940
- Preceded by: MacGillivray Milne
- Succeeded by: Jesse Wallace

Personal details
- Born: February 12, 1889 Alexandria, Minnesota, US
- Died: October 18, 1959 (aged 70) La Jolla, California, US
- Spouse: Nina A. Hertzberg
- Education: United States Naval Academy
- Occupation: Naval officer
- Awards: Navy Cross; Legion of Merit; Bronze Star Medal

Military service
- Allegiance: United States
- Branch/service: United States Navy
- Years of service: 1911–1951
- Rank: Vice admiral
- Commands: USS Erie; USS Indianapolis; 15th Naval District; BatDiv 9
- Battles/wars: World War I World War II

Edward William Hanson (February 12, 1889 – October 18, 1959) was a United States Navy Vice admiral and the governor of American Samoa from June 26, 1938, to July 30, 1940. As Governor of American Samoa, Hanson believed that the native Samoans had a good way of life, and did little to interfere with established practices on the islands.

== Early years and World War I ==
Edward William Hanson was born on February 12, 1889, in Alexandria, Minnesota. He attended the United States Naval Academy at Annapolis, Maryland and graduated in 1911 with the rank of Ensign.

With the entry of the United States into World War I, LTJG Hanson was appointed as commanding officer of USS Dale, a Bainbridge-class destroyer, which patrolled Manila Bay in the summer of 1917. Hanson was ordered to Gibraltar in the same year. During the voyage to Europe, which was longer than 11,000 miles, USS Dale was under very unfavorable weather conditions. Hanson managed to sail Dale without serious damage, so the ship was ready for immediate participation in operations against the enemy. LTJG Hanson was awarded the Navy Cross for his command of USS Dale.

=== Navy Cross citation ===
Edward W. Hanson was awarded the Navy Cross. The official U.S. Navy citation for his Navy Cross reads:

Action Date: Summer, 1917
Name: Edward William Hanson
Service: Navy
Rank: Lieutenant Junior Grade
Company: Commanding Officer
Division: U.S.S. Dale
Citation: The President of the United States of America takes pleasure in presenting the Navy Cross to Lieutenant, Junior Grade Edward William Hanson, United States Navy, for exceptionally distinguished service in the line of his profession in Command of the U.S.S. DALE in making the trip of 11,000 miles from Manila, Philippine Islands, to Gibraltar, under very unfavorable weather conditions, during the Summer of 1917, the southwest monsoon being then at its height, and arriving in the Mediterranean with his vessel in readiness for immediate participation in the operations against enemy submarines in the Mediterranean and later in the Atlantic.

== Interwar period ==
After the War, Hanson served on the staff of the Harvard Naval Science Department at Harvard University and subsequently on USS Black Hawk. Hanson also attended the Naval War College in 1925. In 1927, he was transferred to USS West Virginia, where he served as Ship Engineer for almost two years. In the next years, Hanson served also aboard USS Arkansas, USS Wyoming and USS Texas as a staff officer. Between years 1931–1932 Hanson returned to West Virginia as her navigator.

In July 1936, Hanson got his first command, when he was appointed commanding officer of USS Erie, a newly launched gunboat. Hanson commanded the ship during protection of American interests and citizens during the Spanish Civil War. Then USS Erie was used as a training ship for midshipmen, operating out of the United States Naval Academy in Annapolis.

On June 26, 1938, Hanson was appointed the Governor of American Samoa. As Governor, he believed that the native Samoans had a good way of life, and did little to interfere with established practices on the islands. At the time of his governorship, he was a commander.

== World War II ==
At the end of July 1940, Hanson ended his term as a Governor. He was subsequently promoted to the rank of Captain and appointed the commanding officer of the Naval Station Tutuila, also in American Samoa.

In October 1941, he was appointed the commanding officer of the heavy cruiser USS Indianapolis. Two months later (during the Japanese attack on Pearl Harbor), Hanson commanded USS Indianapolis during a training mission conducting a mock bombardment at Johnston Atoll. After the attack on Pearl Harbor, Hanson got order to search for Japanese carriers responsible for the attack, though the ship did not locate them.

Hanson subsequently commanded USS Indianapolis during the New Guinea campaign and also during the Aleutian Islands Campaign in the Pacific War. He was subsequently appointed the commander of Battleship Division 9 in July 1942.

Hanson commanded Battleship Division 9 for the rest of the war and spent this time in the Pacific. In August 1945, Hanson was transferred to Hawaii, where he succeeded Rear Admiral William R. Furlong as a Commander of Pearl Harbor Navy Yard.

== Postwar service and retirement ==
On February 13, 1948, Hanson was assumed command of the 15th Naval District, headquartered at Balboa in the Panama Canal Zone. While in this capacity, he was decorated with Order of Vasco Núñez de Balboa, rank Commander by Government of Panama and Order of Merit, rank Commander by Chile.

Hanson retired from the Navy with the rank of vice admiral on February 1, 1951, and settled in La Jolla, California near San Diego. Edward William Hanson died there on October 18, 1959, aged 70. He is buried together with his wife Nina A. Hanson (1903–1974) at Fort Rosecrans National Cemetery.

== Decorations ==
Here is the ribbon bar of Vice Admiral Edward W. Hanson:

| 1st Row | Navy Cross | | |
| 2nd Row | Legion of Merit with "V" Device | Bronze Star Medal with "V" Device | Mexican Service Medal |
| 3rd Row | World War I Victory Medal with Destroyer Clasp | American Defense Service Medal with Fleet Clasp | Asiatic-Pacific Campaign Medal with five Service stars |
| 4th Row | American Campaign Medal | World War II Victory Medal | National Defense Service Medal |
| 5th Row | Philippine Liberation Medal with two service stars | Order of Vasco Núñez de Balboa, rank Commander (Panama) | Order of Merit, rank Commander (Chile) |
