= Janice O'Hara =

- Pitcher / Utility
- Born: November 30, 1918; Beardstown, Illinois, U.S.
- Died: March 7, 2001 (aged 82); Tulsa, Oklahoma, U.S.
- Batted: Right Threw: Right

Teams
- Kenosha Comets (1943–1949)

Janice Winifred O'Hara [״Jenny״] (November 30, 1918 – March 7, 2001) was a pitcher and utility who played from 1943 through 1949 in the All-American Girls Professional Baseball League (AAGPBL). Listed at 5 ft 6 in (1.68 m), 122 lb., she batted and threw right-handed.

Janice was one of the sixty original players to join the All-American Girls Professional Baseball League.

Born in Beardstown, Illinois, O'Hara started playing organized softball in Springfield in her teen years, until AAGPBL scout Eddie Stumpf interviewed her and sent her to the final tryout at Wrigley Field in Chicago. In the process, she signed a contract and joined the Kenosha Comets, playing for them her entire career in the league.

Comets manager Josh Billings used O'Hara at first base and she hit a respectable .187 average and posted career-numbers in hits (63), triples (6), runs (46) and RBI (28), helping Kenosha win the second half of the 1943 season. The team faced first-half winner Racine Belles in the best-of-five series and was shut out in three games.

By 1944, new manager Marty McManus turned O'Hara into a utility player. She collected a personal-high 37 stolen bases and belted the only home run of her career in that season. After that, she mostly played at first base and in the outfield, but also filled in at second base and third base through the 1946 season.

In 1947 O'Hara was converted into a pitcher by then manager Ralph Shinners. In her repertoire she included a fastball, a curve and specially a knuckleball, which she loved to use. She turned in a 6–8 record with a 3.51 earned run average in 21 appearances. The next year she went 4–6 in 20 games while lowering her ERA to 3.20. Used sparingly in 1949, she had a 2–3 mark and a 4.65 ERA in 11 games.

In a seven-year career, O'Hara posted a 13–17 record and a 3.56 ERA in 55 games. As a hitter, she batted a .199 average in 309 games. In three postseason appearances, she batted .130 (3-for-23) in seven games and hurled six innings of shutout ball for a perfect 0.00 ERA.

Following her baseball career, O'Hara worked as an accountant for 31 years and retired in 1982. She later spent her time in the garden and attended AAGPBL Players Association reunions. The association was largely responsible for the opening of Women in Baseball, a permanent display at the Baseball Hall of Fame and Museum in Cooperstown, New York, which was unveiled in 1988 to honor the entire All-American Girls Professional Baseball League.

Janice O'Hara died in 2001 in Tulsa, Oklahoma, at the age of 82.

== Career statistics ==
Pitching

GP	W	L	W-L%	ERA	IP	H	RA	ER	BB	SO	HBP	WP	WHIP
55	13	17	.433	3.56	296	256	169	117	140	81	12	3	1.34

Batting

GP	AB	R	H	2B	3B	HR	RBI	SB	BB	SO	BA	OBP	SLG
309	936	100	156	11	8	1	83	94	99	96	.167	.246	.199

Fielding

GP	PO	A	E	TC	DP	FA
400	1541	309	86	1936	34	.956
