= Faranak Miraftab =

American urbanist

- فرانک میرآفتاب
- Awards: Davidoff Book Award; C. Wright Mills Award (finalist)

Academic background
- Education: Tehran University, College of Fine Arts (BA); Norwegian Institute of Technology (MA); University of California, Berkeley (PhD)

Academic work
- Discipline: Urban planning
- Institutions: University of Illinois Urbana-Champaign

Faranak Miraftab is an Iranian-American urban scholar and is currently a professor of Urban and Regional Planning at the University of Illinois Urbana-Champaign. She is known for her works on urban planning and development. She is a winner of Davidoff Book Award and American Sociological Association's Global & Transnational Sociology section Book Award and a finalist in C. Wright Mills Book Award for her book Global Heartland: Displaced Labor, Transnational Lives and Local Placemaking.

== Scientific contribution ==
In line with urbanists John Friedmann, Victoria A. Beard and Leonie Sandercock, she considers insurgent planning according to three practices: transgression, counter-hegemony and imagination.

For the first one, she uses the terms invited spaces and invented spaces to explain the transgression of the dichotomy between those, but also, transgression applies to national boundaries to build transnational solidarities, and time "through a historicized consciousness". For the other practices, counter-hegemony suggests the destabilization of the relations of dominance usually found in western urban planning, and imagination admits to welcome hope in order to advance towards desirable alternatives.

== Books ==
- Miraftab, F. Salo, K. Huq, E. Aristabal D. and Ashtari A. (eds). Constructing Solidarities for a Humane Urbanism. Open source e-Book 2019
- Miraftab, F. Global Heartland: Displaced Labor, Transnational Lives and Local Placemaking. Bloomington: Indiana University Press 2016
- Miraftab, F., D. Wilson and K. Salo (eds.) Cities and Inequalities in a Global and Neoliberal World. New York, London: Routledge 2015
- Miraftab, F. and N. Kudva (eds.) Cities of the Global South Reader. New York, London: Routledge 2015
