= Amphibious command ship =

Type of amphibious warfare ship used for command and control

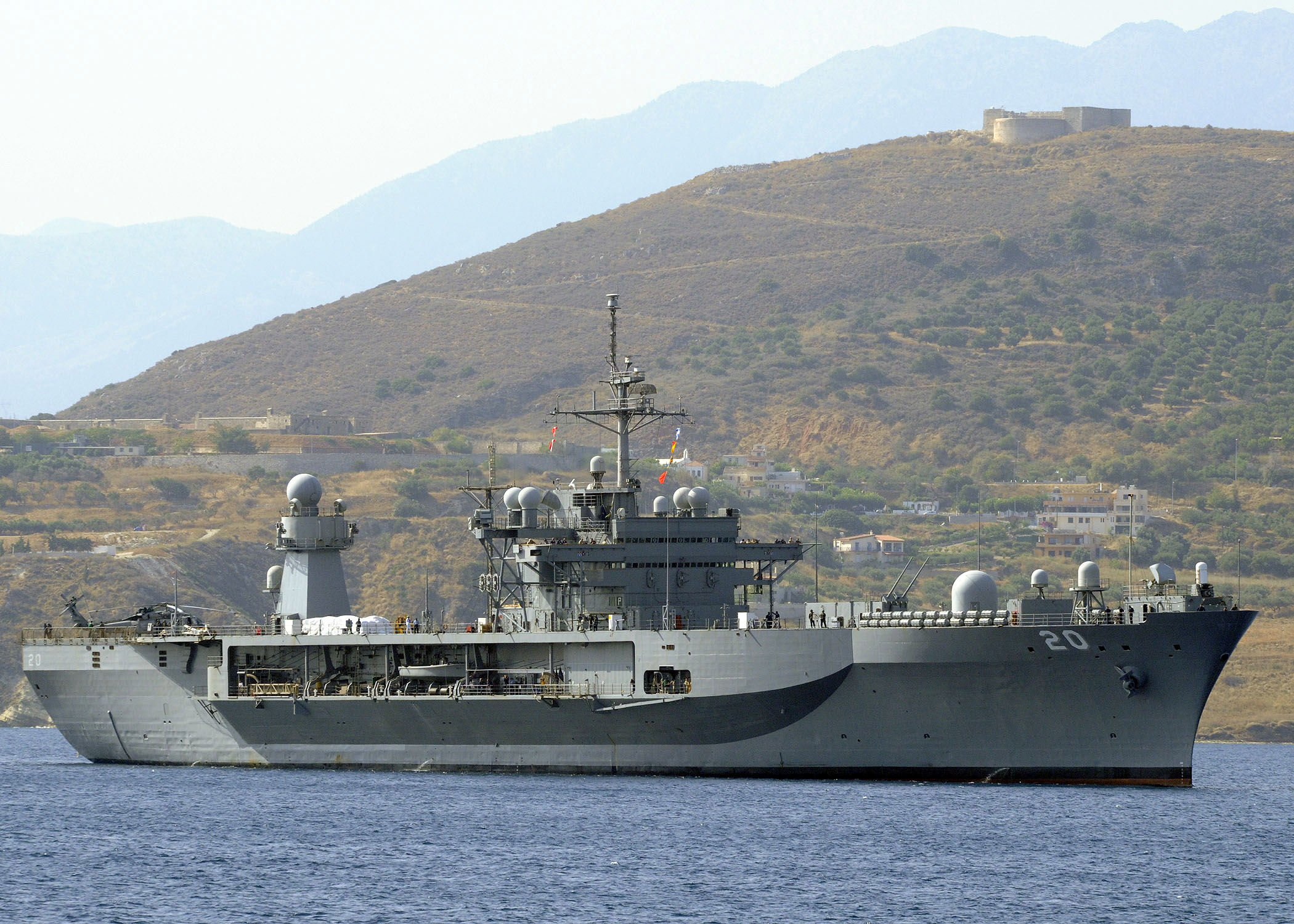
- USS Mount Whitney

Class overview
- Name: Blue Ridge Class
- Builders: Philadelphia Naval Shipyard - LCC 19; Newport News Shipbuilding and Drydock Co. - LCC 20
- Operators: United States Navy
- In commission: 1970 - Present
- Completed: 2
- Active: 2

General characteristics
- Displacement: 18,874 long tons (19,176.89 metric tons) full load
- Length: 634 ft (193 m)
- Beam: 108 ft (33 m)
- Draft: 26 ft 9 in (8.15 m) full load
- Propulsion: Two boilers, one geared turbine, one shaft; 22,000 hp (16,000 kW)
- Speed: 23 kn (26 mph; 43 km/h)
- Range: 13,000 nmi (24,000 km; 15,000 mi) at 16 knots (30 km/h)
- Complement: 720 enlisted, 23 officers
- Aircraft carried: All helicopters except the CH-53 Sea Stallion can be carried

An amphibious command ship (LCC) of the United States Navy is a large, special-purpose ship, originally designed to command large amphibious invasions. However, as amphibious invasions have become unlikely, they are now used as general command ships, and serve as floating headquarters for the various combatant commands. Currently, they are assigned to the 6th and 7th Fleets as flagships.

== Active ships ==
- USS Blue Ridge (LCC-19)
- USS Mount Whitney (LCC-20)

== Previous ships ==
USS Mount McKinley (AGC-7) was the lead ship of the previous class of amphibious force command ships. She was designed as an amphibious force flagship, a floating command post with advanced communications equipment and extensive combat information spaces to be used by the amphibious forces commander and landing force commander during large-scale operations.

== World War II ==
In World War II this type of ship was termed Amphibious Force Flagship (AGC). It was not a specific ship class, but rather one that had appropriate radio capabilities and space for command operations. Typically a merchant ship under construction would be completed as an Amphibious Force Flagship, but some ships were refitted for this purpose.

- USS Ancon (AGC-4), former AP-66
- USCGC Duane (WAGC-6), former WPG-33
- USS Biscayne (AGC-18), former AVP-11
- USCGC Taney (WAGC-37), former WPG-37

The original meaning of AGC was based on the General Auxiliary class of miscellaneous unclassified vessels AG and sub-class C, with 3 possible meanings; Command, Control, or Communications, but it became an anacronym, since all AGCs were called Amphibious Force Flagships. The British used the term Landing Ship Infantry (Headquarters) for this type of ship.

== See also ==
- List of United States Navy amphibious warfare ships § Amphibious Force Flagship (AGC)
- List of United States Navy amphibious warfare ships § Amphibious Command Ship (LCC)
