= USS Mount McKinley =

US Navy amphibious force command ship

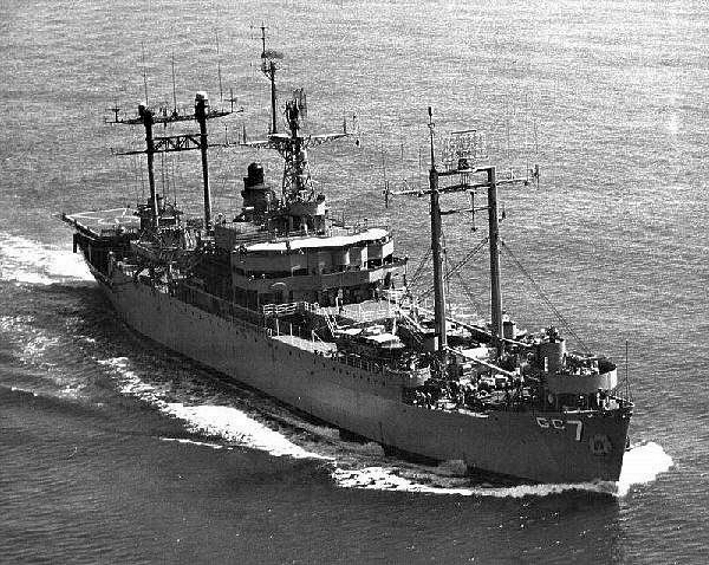
- USS Mount McKinley (AGC-7)

History

United States
- Name: Mount McKinley
- Namesake: Mount McKinley in Alaska
- Laid down: 31 July 1943
- Launched: 27 September 1943
- Commissioned: 1 May 1944
- Decommissioned: 26 March 1970
- Stricken: 30 July 1976
- Fate: Sold for scrap in 1979

General characteristics
- Class & type: Mount McKinley-class command ship
- Displacement: 12,550 tons
- Length: 459 ft 2 in (139.95 m)
- Beam: 63 ft (19 m)
- Draft: 25 ft (7.6 m)
- Speed: 15 knots (28 km/h)
- Complement: 664
- Armament: 1 × 5 in (130 mm)/38 cal. gun; 4 × twin 40 mm guns

USS Mount McKinley (AGC-7/LCC-7) was the lead ship of the Mount McKinley class of amphibious force command ships. She was named after the highest mountain in North America. She was designed as an amphibious force flagship, a floating command post with advanced communications equipment and extensive combat information spaces to be used by the amphibious forces commander and landing force commander during large-scale operations.

== Launch and commissioning ==
Mount McKinley (AGC-7), was laid down as Cyclone, a transport, on 31 July 1943 by North Carolina Shipbuilding Company, Wilmington, North Carolina; launched on 27 September, sponsored by Mrs. T. L. Lainer; renamed Mount McKinley on 27 December 1943; and commissioned at the Philadelphia Naval Shipyard on 1 May 1944.

== World War II ==
After a brief shakedown cruise, she departed Norfolk 8 June 1944 for Hawaii, arriving at Pearl Harbor on 27 June. Mount McKinley got underway on 20 July, for Palau with III Amphibious Corps embarked.

The assault force arrived off Peleliu 15 September, with Major General Roy S. Geiger, USMC, directing the landing of the 1st Marine Division. On 28 September, Mount McKinley proceeded to nearby Ngesebus Island to provide shore bombardment coordination.

Mount McKinley left the area 14 October after Peleliu and the chain's other main islands were secure. After a stop at Hollandia, Dutch New Guinea, the ship sailed to San Pedro Bay, Leyte Gulf, for the assault on Leyte and Ormoc. While in San Pedro Bay, the force was under constant air attack, but Mount McKinley was not hit. On 15 December the ship participated in the invasion of Mindoro and proceeded to Lingayen Gulf to direct shore bombardment on 9 January.

After directing an unopposed landing at San Narciso, near Subic Bay, the command ship returned to Leyte Gulf.

On 21 March 1945, Mount McKinley proceeded to Kerama Retto off the southern coast of Okinawa. Six days prior to the last major assault of the war, Mount McKinley directed the landing of the 77th Infantry Division. For the next two months, she remained at anchorage at Kerama Retto, threatened by constant air attacks. On 22 May, she sailed for Saipan, thence to Pearl Harbor and San Francisco, arriving in CONUS 23 June.

== Postwar ==
In overhaul for two months, she deployed 20 August. Arriving Sasebo 23 September, she participated in landing occupation troops there and at Kure. Returning to the United States 12 February 1946, she sailed in the early summer for Bikini Atoll where she was flagship for Operation Crossroads, flying the flag of Admiral William H. P. Blandy, Joint Task Force One's commander during the atomic tests. Following the atomic bomb tests in July, the ship operated out of San Diego for the next 18 months.

In early 1948, she was the command ship for the atomic bomb test at Eniwetok. Upon completion of these tests, she returned to San Diego to resume coastal operations.

== Korean War ==
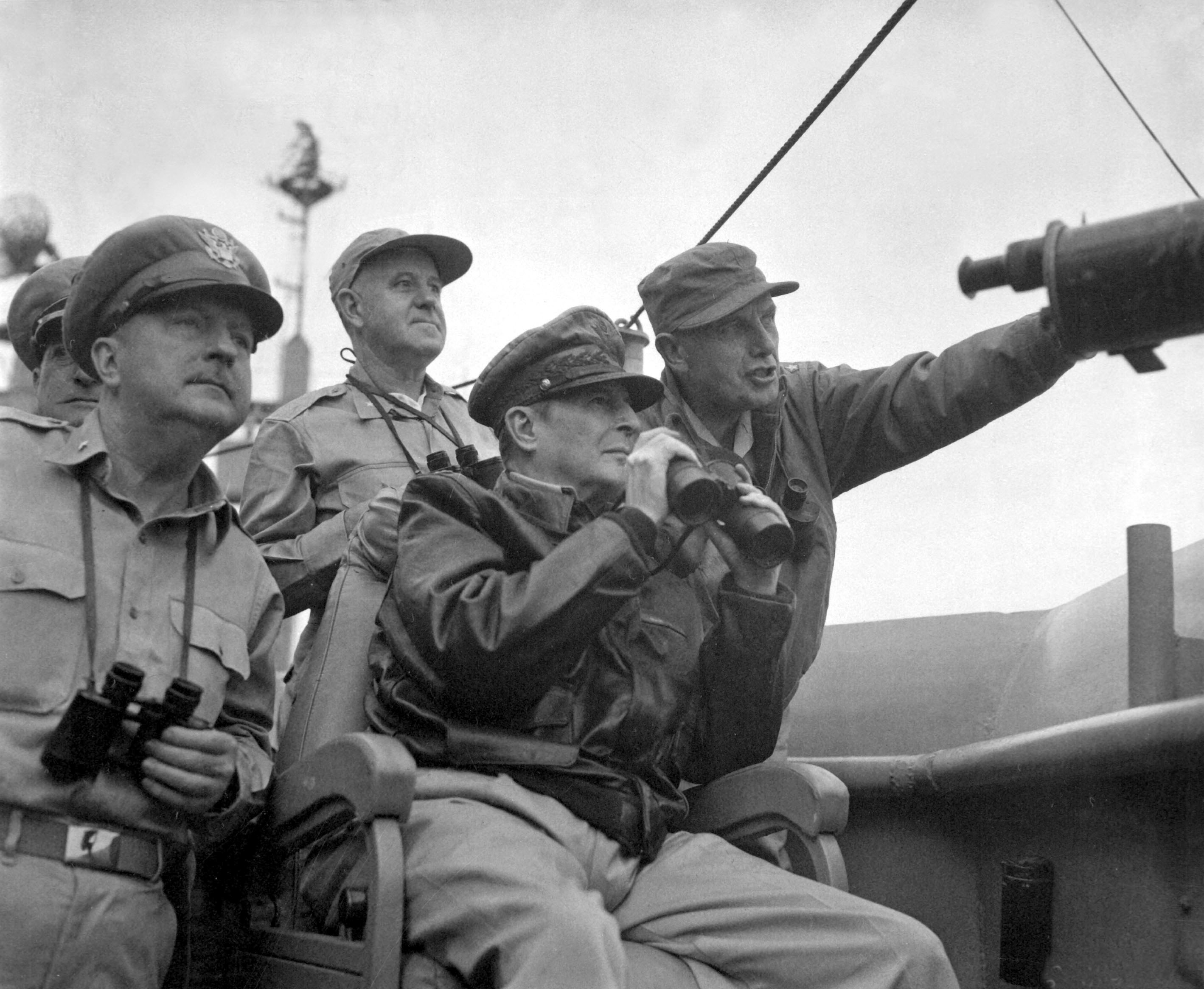
MacArthur observes the naval shelling of Incheon from Mount McKinley, 15 September 1950 with Brigadier General Courtney Whitney (left) and Major General Edward M. Almond (right).

On 20 May 1950, Mount McKinley was underway for WesPac to conduct training operations with the 8th Army. On 26 June, the ship proceeded from Japan to direct the landing of American reinforcements at Pohang at the beginning of the Korean War. In early September 1950, General Douglas MacArthur was aboard, directing the amphibious assault at Inchon which forced the North Koreans to retreat north. The next assault was on the heavily mined port of Wonsan.

When the Chinese People's Volunteer Army entered the war and UN troops were pushed back to the Hungnam beachhead, Mount McKinley assisted in the evacuation. In late January 1951, she assisted in the transfer of thousands of Korean refugees to Cheju Island.

On 7 June 1951, Mount McKinley sailed from Yokosuka and entered Mare Island Naval Shipyard 3 August for an extensive overhaul. Mount McKinley departed for WesPac, 6 March 1952, returning to the States 30 January 1953. While in Mare Island Naval Shipyard, a helicopter deck was installed on the fantail.

Mount McKinley sailed again, 27 October 1953, for her third tour of duty in the Korean War area, arriving at Yokosuka 16 November. From then until her departure for the United States 30 July 1954, the ship was involved in fleet and amphibious exercises off Japan, Korea, and Taiwan. After arrival in San Diego 18 August, the remainder of the year was spent in local operations and a month-long training exercise off Hawaii in October.

In the spring of 1955, Mount McKinley served as flagship for Operation Wigwam, an underwater atomic bomb test in the central Pacific. After a yard overhaul in the summer of 1955, the amphibious flagship returned to WestPac in January 1956 for a three-month period. In April, she was press observer ship for further nuclear tests.

== Atlantic and Mediterranean service ==
On 3 June 1956, the ship returned to San Diego and was detached from the Pacific Fleet 1 September. She arrived Norfolk 20 September via the Panama Canal.

The following 9 January 1957, the ship deployed to the Mediterranean. While in the eastern Mediterranean, the ship rescued the crew of a burning Greek fishing vessel, extinguished the fire and towed the damaged vessel into port. After conducting NATO and fleet exercises in the Mediterranean, she returned to Norfolk 19 June. September and early October were spent in Operation Strikeback and other NATO exercises in the eastern Atlantic. Mount McKinley was anchored in Portsmouth Navy Yard to provide command and control for parts of the 'Orange' opposition naval forces during Operation Strikeback.

In January 1958, Mount McKinley deployed to 6th Fleet, operating with the Amphibious Ready Group in NATO and U.S. exercises. Due to return to the States in June, the ship's departure was delayed due to increasing tensions in the Middle East. The ship served as an afloat headquarters for the Marine force landed in Lebanon during the crisis of July 1958. She returned to Norfolk 16 August.

Mount McKinley's third Mediterranean cruise from 20 February to 26 August 1959 was marked by seven amphibious exercises involving U.S. and NATO forces.

In February 1960, the ship sailed to Valparaíso, Chile, via the Panama Canal to provide communications support for President Eisenhower's good will visit to Latin America. On 19 April, Mount McKinley deployed to 6th Fleet, returning to Norfolk 7 December. Upon completion of her yard period in the summer of 1961, Mount McKinley made her fifth deployment to the Mediterranean from September to February 1962, acting as flagship for several large scale amphibious exercises.

In October, during the Cuban Missile Crisis, Mount McKinley served at flagship for ComPhibLant and ComPhIbGru 4. Following the Cuban quarantine, she sailed for the Mediterranean 10 January 1963 to act as command flagship for the Amphibious Strike Force. Arriving back in Norfolk 2 August 1963, she entered Norfolk Naval Shipyard for a FRAM II overhaul, extending from September to January 1964.

After refresher training and exercise "Quick Kick V", AGC 7 departed Norfolk 10 May, arriving San Diego 26 May via Panama Canal. Immediately after the Tonkin Gulf Incident, the ship was ordered to Southeast Asia.

== Vietnam War ==
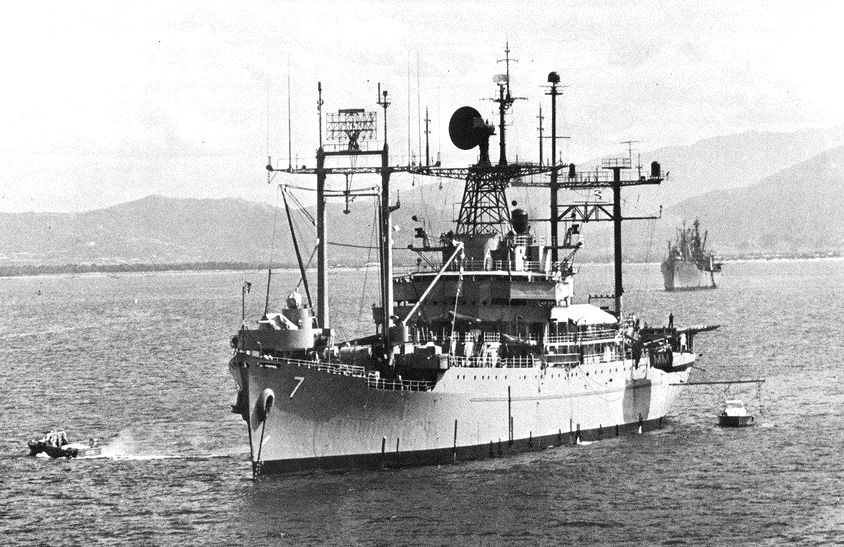
Mount McKinley off Vietnam, in 1969.

The ship sailed from San Diego 25 August, arriving Luzon 16 September. She relieved its sister ship, USS Eldorado, at Subic Bay a week later, becoming flagship of the 7th Fleet, Amphibious Strike Force. Taking station in the South China Sea, with other elements of Amphibious Group 1, Mount McKinley stood prepared for any contingency.

While proceeding to Bangkok, Mount McKinley came to the assistance of USS Herkimer, whose master was severely ill. Herkimer's captain was taken on board for further treatment in Singapore while the MSTS ship sailed on to Saigon. In early March and again in mid April, the flagship coordinated the landing of Marine reinforcements at Da Nang and Huế, South Vietnam.

Relieved by Estes at Subic Bay in April, she arrived at San Diego on 15 May 1965. The command ship sailed again from San Diego on 15 March, arriving at Subic Bay on 17 April via Pearl Harbor. Based there, the ship visited ports in Japan, Taiwan, Hong Kong, Vietnam, and Okinawa, acting as flagship of ComPhibGru 1.

On 23 August, Mount McKinley sailed for home, arriving 19 September 1966. She sailed on its third WesPac deployment 1 July, arriving Da Nang 28 July to become once more the flagship of Commander, 7th Fleet Amphibious Force. She provided communications support for search and destroy operations against the Vietcong and People's Army of Vietnam forces. As in earlier deployments, support for military forces was combined with civic action operations to assist civilians.

Relieved in mid-January, the ship sailed east for CONUS and home, arriving San Diego 10 February 1968. The ship's designation was changed from AGC-7 to LCC-7 on 1 January 1969. Following her arrival back in CONUS, she was engaged in type training and amphibious exercises on the west coast as flagship of ComPhibGru 3 into 1969.

== Fate ==
Mount McKinley was decommissioned on 26 March 1970 and stricken on 30 July 1976. She was sold for disposal in 1976.

== Awards ==
Mount McKinley received four battle stars for World War II service, eight stars for Korean service, and a Vietnam Meritorious Unit Citation.
