= Global Heartland: Displaced Labor, Transnational Lives and Local Placemaking =

2016 book by Faranak Miraftab

- Author: Faranak Miraftab
- Language: English
- Subject: urban sociology
- Publisher: Indiana University Press
- Publication date: 2016
- Media type: Print (hardcover)
- ISBN: 978-0-253-01942-4

Global Heartland: Displaced Labor, Transnational Lives and Local Placemaking is a 2016 book by Faranak Miraftab in which the author provides an account of "diverse, dispossessed, and displaced people brought together in a former sundown town in Illinois."

== Reception ==
The book was reviewed in the Journal of Planning Education and Research, The AAG Review of Books, Urban Studies, Social Forces, and the International Journal of Urban and Regional Research.
