= Joseph Lowe =

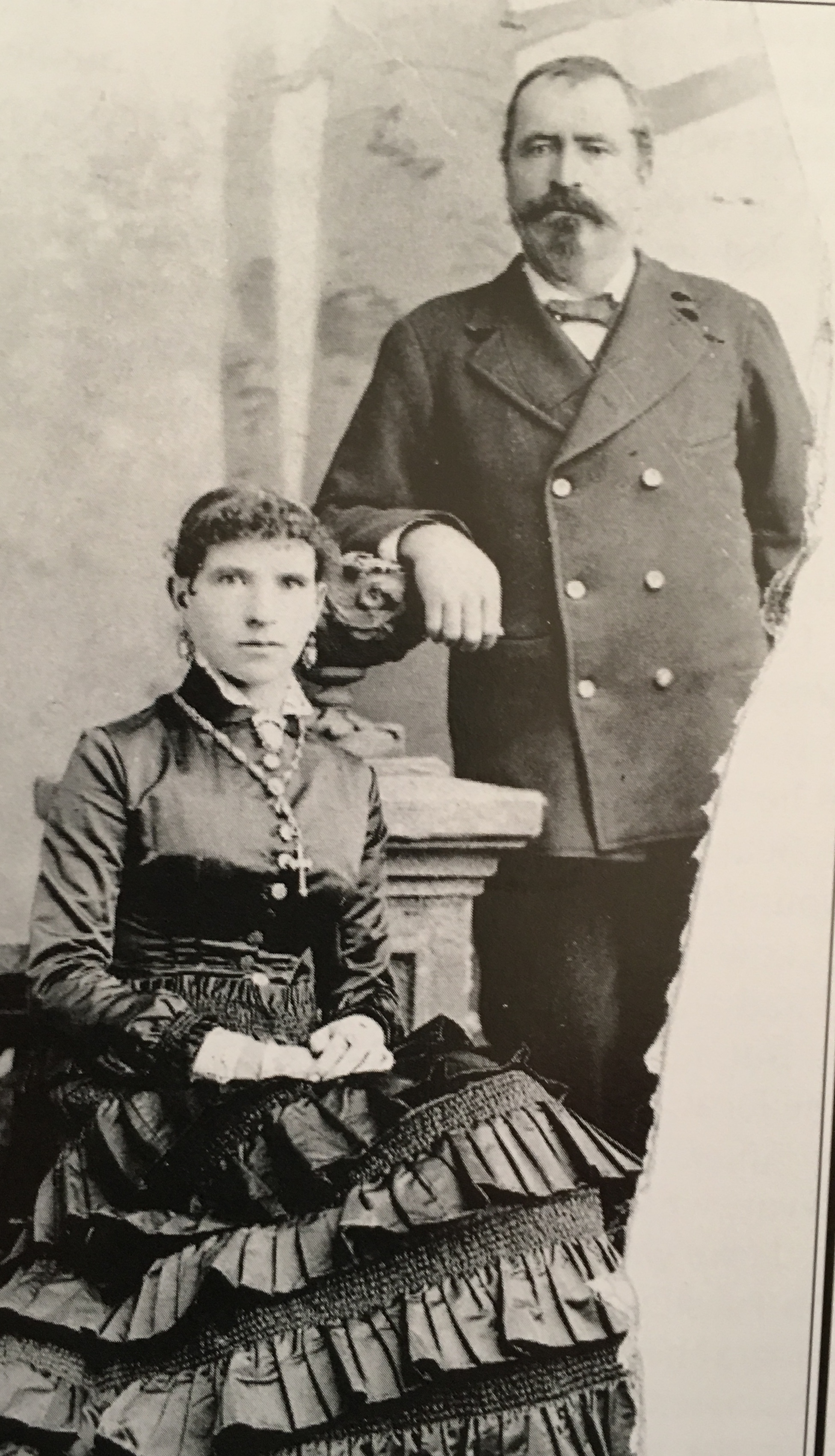
Joseph Lowe and an unidentified woman in 1890

Joseph Lowe (c. 1845–1899), aka "Rowdy Joe" Lowe, was a gambler and saloon keeper/owner of the Old West. Although sometimes described as a gunfighter, he did not historically fit into that category.

Originally from Illinois, Lowe and his wife Katherine, aka "Rowdy Kate", moved to Kansas following the Civil War. The couple relocated to Newton, Kansas in 1871 and opened a tavern and brothel there. Kate sneaked off to a rival brothel in 1872 with a shooter. Joe found out and shot the man. The controversy forced the pair to relocate to the Wichita area where they bought another saloon in Delano, Kansas. This business venture that at first was extremely profitable. On October 27, 1873, Lowe shot and killed fellow saloon owner Edward "Red" Beard after Beard stormed into his saloon shooting at one of Lowe's "girls". Beard hit another girl with one shot, and a patron with another before Lowe shot him.

However, after numerous complaints of cheating and under-handed card deals, Lowe's business began to suffer. The couple moved to Texas, where they rode, on occasion, with the Sam Bass gang. The couple began drifting, gambling and occasionally working in saloons in numerous towns of the Old West. On February 11, 1899, Lowe was drunk in the Walrus Saloon in Denver, Colorado. He began insulting a man named E.A. Kimmel due to his disapproval of Kimmel being a policeman. Kimmel, knowing Lowe had a reputation as a gunman, drew his pistol shooting and killing Lowe, who turned out to be unarmed.

The Wichita City Eagle tells the story of Rowdy Joe Lowe's death being in October 1874. The newspaper reported that Rowdy Joe was attacked by Indians en route to the Black Hills. He was shot by three bullets and instantly died.
