= USS Menard =

1944 Haskell-class attack transport of the U.S. Navy

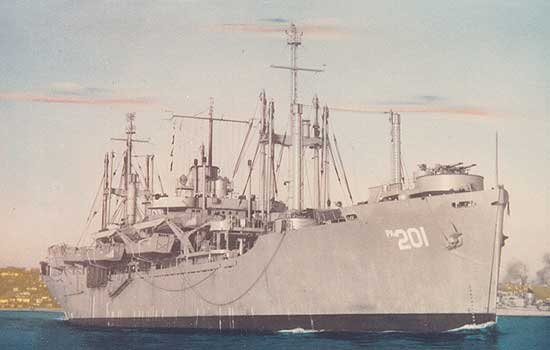
- USS Menard (APA-201), date and place unknown

History

United States
- Name: USS Menard (APA-201)
- Namesake: Menard County, Illinois; Menard County, Texas
- Builder: Kaiser Shipbuilding
- Laid down: 12 July 1944
- Launched: 11 October 1944
- Sponsored by: Mrs Clarence Gustaveson
- Acquired: 31 October 1944
- Commissioned: 31 October 1944
- Decommissioned: 14 June 1948
- Recommissioned: 2 December 1950
- Decommissioned: 18 October 1955
- Stricken: 1 September 1961
- Honours and awards: One battle star for World War II service and three battle stars for Korea service
- Fate: Scrapped 1975

General characteristics
- Class & type: Haskell-class attack transport
- Displacement: 6,873 t.(lt) 14,837 t.(fl)
- Length: 455 ft
- Beam: 62 ft
- Draft: 28 ft 1 in
- Propulsion: 1 × Allis-Chalmers geared turbine, 2 × Babcock & Wilcox header-type boilers, 1 × propeller, designed shaft horsepower 8,500
- Speed: 18 knots
- Boats & landing craft carried: 2 × LCM, 12 × LCVP, 3 × LCPU
- Capacity: 86 Officers 1,475 Enlisted
- Crew: 56 Officers, 480 enlisted
- Armament: 1 × 5"/38 caliber dual-purpose gun mount, 1 × quad 40mm gun mounts, 4 × twin 40mm gun mounts, 10 × single 20mm gun mounts
- Notes: MARCOM hull type VC2-S-AP5

USS Menard (APA-201) was a Haskell-class attack transport that saw service with the US Navy in World War II, the Korean War and Vietnam War.

Menard was laid down under Maritime Commission contract by Kaiser Shipbuilding of Vancouver, Washington on 12 July 1944; launched 11 October 1944 sponsored by Mrs. Clarence Gustaveson; acquired by the Navy 31 October 1944; and commissioned the same day at Astoria, Oregon.

== Operational history ==
=== World War II ===
After shakedown and training along the West Coast, Menard embarked troops and loaded cargo at Port Hueneme, California, before sailing for Hawaiian waters 4 January 1945. Arriving 10 January, she participated in amphibious training exercises out of Pearl Harbor until 22 February when she joined a convoy bound for the western Pacific. She touched at American bases in the Marshalls, the Carolines, and the Palaus, and on 16 March reached Leyte Gulf, Philippines, where she staged for the impending invasion of Okinawa. Assigned to Transport Division 14, she cleared the approaches to Leyte 27 March and sailed northward for the Ryukyus.

Menard closed the coast of Okinawa early 1 April and boatloaded her assault troops for the amphibious sweep to the invasion beaches. Thence, she began off-loading support cargo; despite numerous antishipping strikes by Japanese bombing and suicide planes, she continued these vital supply operations during the next week. On 6 April, an enemy suicide plane attacked her from starboard. Intense gunfire from Menard splashed it off the transport's port quarter.

Departing Okinawa 9 April, Menard steamed in convoy via the Marianas and the Marshalls to Pearl Harbor where she arrived on the 25th. After conducting training operations in preparation for possible invasion of the Japanese mainland, she steamed to San Francisco between 11 and 18 May. She embarked 1,101 troop reinforcements on the 29th and the following day cleared the Golden Gate en route to the Philippines. She reached Samar 23 June and discharged her troops. After embarking more than 300 wounded veterans, she departed for the West Coast 4 July and returned to San Francisco the 23d.

==== After hostilities ====
Following a brief overhaul at Seattle, Menard again sailed for the western Pacific 8 August. For more than a month she shuttled troops to U.S. bases in the Marshalls, the Carolines, and the Marianas. She departed Saipan 18 September and carried 1,467 occupation troops to Japan. She arrived at Nagasaki 23 September, debarked her troops, and sailed the 28th for "Magic Carpet" duty.

Steaming via the Philippines, Menard embarked 1,898 homeward bound troops at Okinawa and sailed 22 October for the United States. She reached Portland, Oregon 6 November; during the rest of 1945 she carried returning veterans to various ports along the West Coast. Between 2 January and 5 February 1946, she steamed to Guam and back, arriving at Seattle with 2,057 troops embarked.

Menard proceeded to San Francisco 27 February and on 8 April, reported to the 19th Fleet at Stockton. Remaining there, she was placed in commission, in reserve, 27 November 1946. On 20 March 1947, she was placed in service, in reserve. She decommissioned 14 June 1948 and remained at Stockton with the Pacific Reserve Fleet.

=== Korean War ===
In light of the Korean War and corresponding demands on American seapower, Menard recommissioned 2 December 1950. After intensive shakedown, she steamed to the Far East in early 1951 to support the movement of men and supplies to the war-torn Korean Peninsula. For more than 3 years, she operated between Japanese and South Korean ports and from the West Coast to the Far East to bolster the vital ocean supply lines to ground forces in South Korea. She provided valuable support to the U.S. effort of repelling Communist aggression in the Republic of Korea.

=== Vietnam ===
Following the Armistice, which ended overt hostilities, Menard continued to operate in the Pacific in support of peacekeeping operations. As a unit of the ever-vigilant 7th Fleet, she steamed to the troubled waters of Vietnam and during the latter part of 1954, participated in the vital "Passage-to-Freedom" operations. During this period, she made runs from Communist controlled North Vietnam and carried refugees and supplies to freedom in the South.

=== Decommissioning ===
Menard returned to the West Coast in mid-1955 and on 1 July reported to the Pacific Reserve Fleet at Long Beach for deactivation. She decommissioned 18 October 1955 and remained berthed at Long Beach. Ordered to be transferred to the Maritime Administration in 1961, her name was struck from the Navy List 1 September 1961. In 1969, Menard was berthed in the National Defense Reserve Fleet at Suisun Bay, California.

Final Disposition: Menard was sold to the Gillette Razor Company in 1975 for scrap.

=== Awards ===
Menard received one battle star for World War II service and three battle stars for Korean War service. She received also the Combat Action Ribbon (retroactive), China Service Medal (extended), American Campaign Medal, Asiatic-Pacific Campaign Medal (1), World War II Victory Medal, Navy Occupation Service Medal (with Asia clasp), National Defense Service Medal, Korean Service Medal (3), United Nations Service Medal, Republic of Korea War Service Medal (retroactive)
