= Task Force 90 (United States) =

Task Force 90 was a United States Navy task force.

In 1945 it was Aircraft, North Pacific Force, under Major General D. Johnson USA, part of North Pacific Force under Vice Admiral Frank Fletcher.

In the Korean War it controlled the amphibious forces in theatre. It reported directly to Commander Naval Forces Far East. Its most high-profile operation was the Incheon amphibious assault, Operation Chromite.

It was later active during Operation Passage to Freedom after the Geneva Accords of 1955.
