= Sangamon Valley Township, Cass County, Illinois =

Sangamon Valley Township
- Township
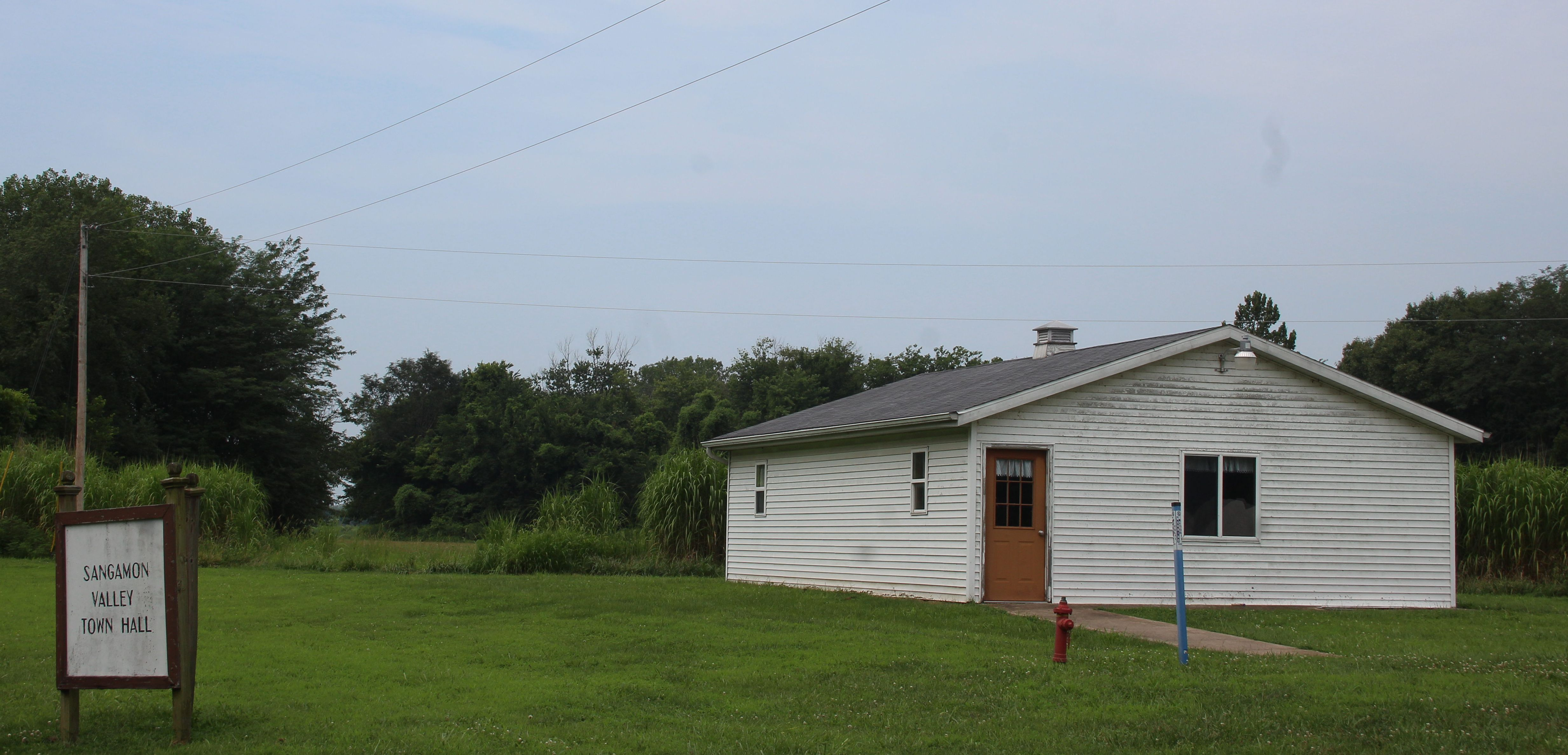
- Township building

- Location in Cass County

- Cass County's location in Illinois
- Coordinates: 40°00′34″N 90°12′53″W
- Country: United States
- State: Illinois
- County: Cass
- Established: November 6, 1923

Area
  - Total: 39.81 sq mi (103.1 km^{2})
  - Land: 39.71 sq mi (102.8 km^{2})
  - Water: 0.1 sq mi (0.26 km^{2}) 0.25%
- Elevation: 620 ft (189 m)

Population (2020)
  - Total: 330
  - Density: 8.3/sq mi (3.2/km^{2})
- Time zone: UTC-6 (CST)
  - Summer (DST): UTC-5 (CDT)
- ZIP codes: 62618, 62627, 62691
- FIPS code: 17-017-67600

Sangamon Valley Township is one of eleven townships in Cass County, Illinois, USA. As of the 2020 census, its population was 330 and it contained 160 housing units.

== Geography ==
According to the 2010 census, the township has a total area of 39.81 square miles (103.1 km^{2}), of which 39.71 square miles (102.8 km^{2}) (or 99.75%) is land and 0.1 square miles (0.26 km^{2}) (or 0.25%) is water.

=== Cities, towns, villages ===
- Chandlerville (west edge)
- Virginia (north edge)

=== Unincorporated towns ===
- Cass (historical)
- Jules

(This list is based on USGS data and may include former settlements.)

=== Cemeteries ===
The township contains these three cemeteries: Cauby, Powell and Walnut Ridge.

=== Major highways ===
- Illinois Route 78
- Illinois Route 125

=== Rivers ===
- Sangamon River

=== Lakes ===
- Cottonwood Lake

=== Landmarks ===
- Panther Creek Conservation Area (west three-quarters)
- Panther Creek State Wildlife Refuge

== Demographics ==
Historical population
Census	Pop.	Note	%±
1930	610		—
1940	561		−8.0%
1950	488		−13.0%
1960	415		−15.0%
1970	361		−13.0%
1980	380		5.3%
1990	380		0.0%
2000	328		−13.7%
2010	328		0.0%
2020	330		0.6%
U.S. Decennial Census

As of the 2020 census there were 330 people, 206 households, and 83 families residing in the township. The population density was 8.30 inhabitants per square mile (3.20/km^{2}). There were 160 housing units at an average density of 4.03 per square mile (1.56/km^{2}). The racial makeup of the township was 95.76% White, 0.00% African American, 0.30% Native American, 0.00% Asian, 0.00% Pacific Islander, 1.82% from other races, and 2.12% from two or more races. Hispanic or Latino of any race were 4.55% of the population.

There were 206 households, out of which 27.20% had children under the age of 18 living with them, 40.29% were married couples living together, none had a female householder with no spouse present, and 59.71% were non-families. 56.80% of all households were made up of individuals, and 36.40% had someone living alone who was 65 years of age or older. The average household size was 2.40 and the average family size was 4.42.

The township's age distribution consisted of 37.9% under the age of 18, 0.8% from 18 to 24, 22.7% from 25 to 44, 16.4% from 45 to 64, and 22.3% who were 65 years of age or older. The median age was 37.8 years. For every 100 females, there were 84.3 males. For every 100 females age 18 and over, there were 90.7 males.

The median income for a household in the township was $84,167, and the median income for a family was $69,479. Males had a median income of $59,107 versus $14,632 for females. The per capita income for the township was $32,554. None of the population was below the poverty line.

== School districts ==
- A-C Central Community Unit School District 262
- Beardstown Community Unit School District 15
- Virginia Community Unit School District 64

== Political districts ==
- Illinois's 18th congressional district
- State House District 93
- State Senate District 47
