= Philadelphia Township, Cass County, Illinois =

Philadelphia Township
- Township
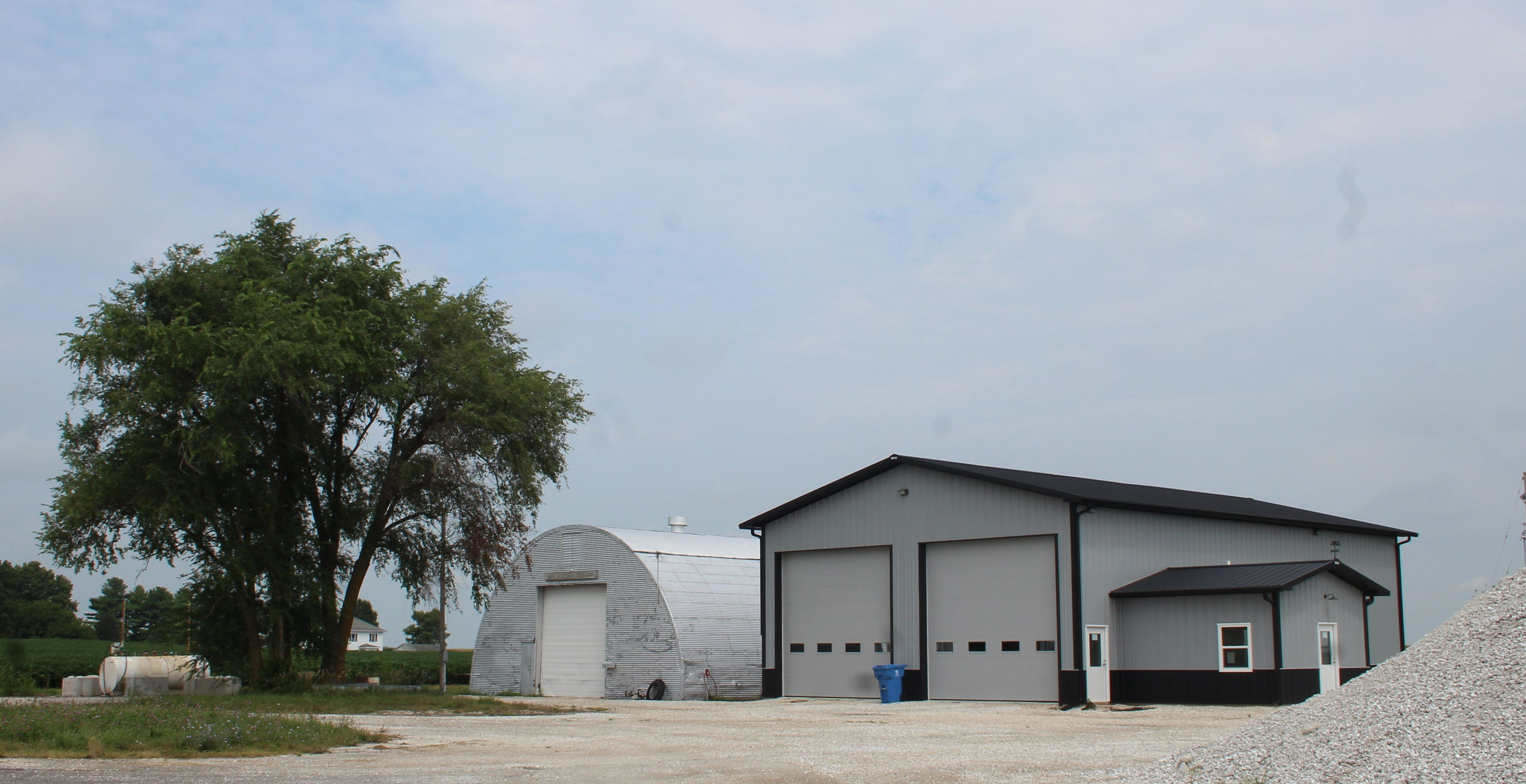
- Township building

- Location in Cass County

- Cass County's location in Illinois
- Coordinates: 39°55′08″N 90°06′54″W
- Country: United States
- State: Illinois
- County: Cass
- Established: November 6, 1923

Area
  - Total: 36.24 sq mi (93.9 km^{2})
  - Land: 36.24 sq mi (93.9 km^{2})
  - Water: 0 sq mi (0 km^{2}) 0%
- Elevation: 620 ft (189 m)

Population (2020)
  - Total: 208
  - Estimate: 208
  - Density: 5.74/sq mi (2.22/km^{2})
- Time zone: UTC-6 (CST)
  - Summer (DST): UTC-5 (CDT)
- ZIP codes: 62612, 62691
- FIPS code: 17-017-59481

Philadelphia Township is one of eleven townships in Cass County, Illinois, USA. As of the 2020 census, its population was 208 and it contained 101 housing units.

== Geography ==
According to the 2010 census, the township has a total area of 36.24 square miles (93.9 km^{2}), all land.

=== Unincorporated towns ===
- Old Princeton
- Philadelphia

(This list is based on USGS data and may include former settlements.)

=== Cemeteries ===
The township contains these nine cemeteries: Beard, Black, Centenary, Garner Chapel, Harding, Hopkins, John Robertson, McDonald and Page A Williams.

=== Major highways ===
- Illinois Route 125

== Demographics ==
Historical population
Census	Pop.	Note	%±
1930	630		—
1940	608		−3.5%
1950	463		−23.8%
1960	452		−2.4%
1970	372		−17.7%
1980	296		−20.4%
1990	270		−8.8%
2000	235		−13.0%
2010	221		−6.0%
2020	208		−5.9%
U.S. Decennial Census

As of the 2020 census there were 208 people, 71 households, and 35 families residing in the township. The population density was 5.74 inhabitants per square mile (2.22/km^{2}). There were 101 housing units at an average density of 2.79 per square mile (1.08/km^{2}). The racial makeup of the township was 94.23% White, 0.96% African American, 0.48% Native American, 0.48% Asian, 0.00% Pacific Islander, 0.00% from other races, and 3.85% from two or more races. Hispanic or Latino of any race were 0.00% of the population.

There were 71 households, out of which 5.60% had children under the age of 18 living with them, 18.31% were married couples living together, none had a female householder with no spouse present, and 50.70% were non-families. 42.30% of all households were made up of individuals, and 42.30% had someone living alone who was 65 years of age or older. The average household size was 1.48 and the average family size was 1.83.

The township's age distribution consisted of 4.8% under the age of 18, none from 18 to 24, 14.3% from 25 to 44, 5.7% from 45 to 64, and 75.2% who were 65 years of age or older. The median age was 67.6 years. For every 100 females, there were 250.0 males. For every 100 females age 18 and over, there were 233.3 males.

The median income for a household in the township was $60,536, and the median income for a family was $122,569. The per capita income for the township was $39,585.

== School districts ==
- A-C Central Community Unit School District 262
- Virginia Community Unit School District 64

== Political districts ==
- Illinois' 18th congressional district
- State House District 93
- State Senate District 47
