= Bluff Springs Township, Cass County, Illinois =

Bluff Springs Township
- Township
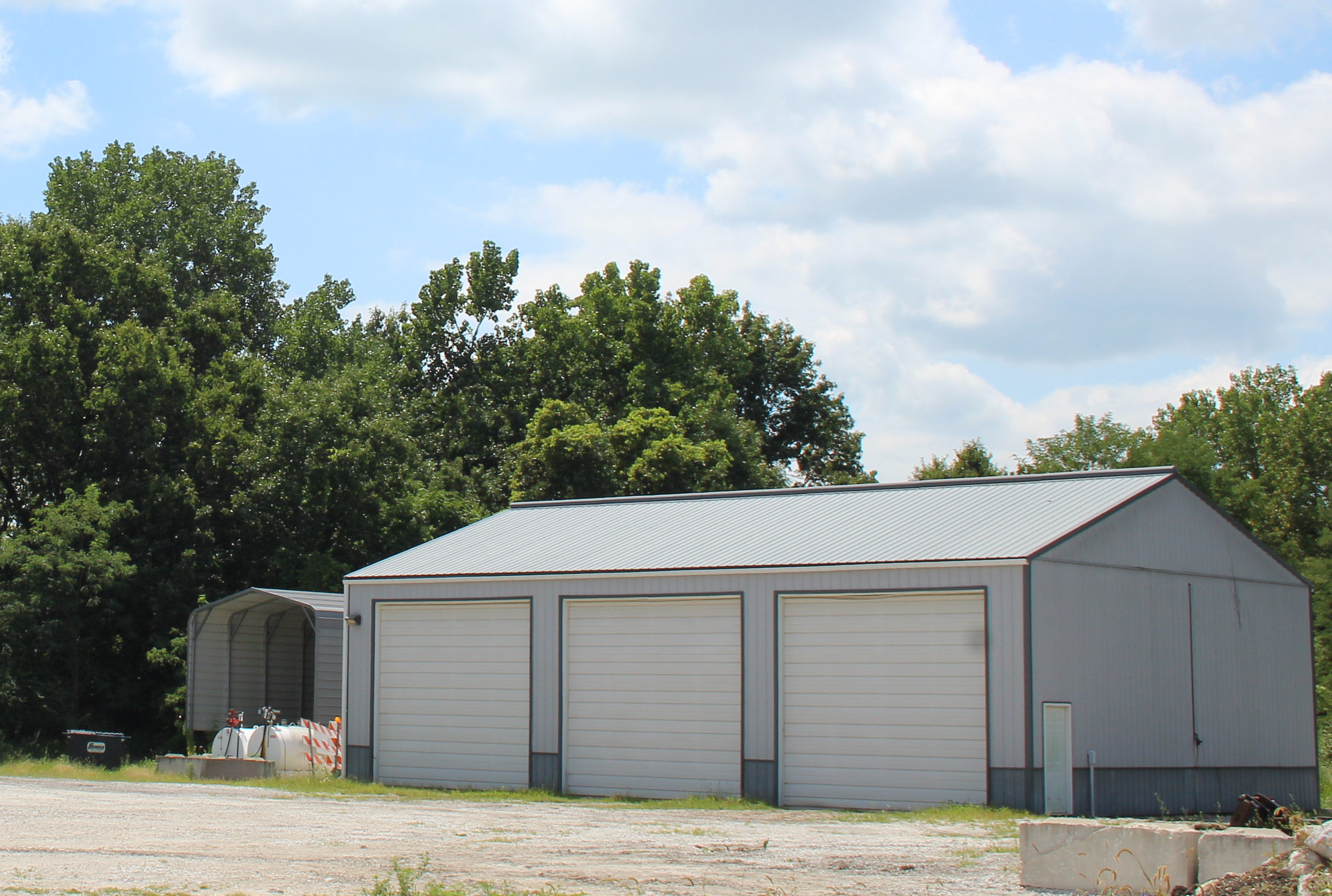
- Township road building

- Location in Cass County

- Cass County's location in Illinois
- Coordinates: 40°02′07″N 90°20′48″W
- Country: United States
- State: Illinois
- County: Cass
- Established: November 6, 1923

Area
  - Total: 59.72 sq mi (154.7 km^{2})
  - Land: 57.75 sq mi (149.6 km^{2})
  - Water: 1.97 sq mi (5.1 km^{2}) 3.30%
- Elevation: 440 ft (134 m)

Population (2020)
  - Total: 886
  - Density: 15.3/sq mi (5.92/km^{2})
- Time zone: UTC-6 (CST)
  - Summer (DST): UTC-5 (CDT)
- ZIP codes: 62611, 62618, 62627, 62691
- FIPS code: 17-017-06938

Bluff Springs Township is one of eleven townships in Cass County, Illinois, USA. As of the 2020 census, its population was 886 and it contained 384 housing units.

== Geography ==
According to the 2010 census, the township has a total area of 59.72 square miles (154.7 km^{2}), of which 57.75 square miles (149.6 km^{2}) (or 96.70%) is land and 1.97 square miles (5.1 km^{2}) (or 3.30%) is water.

=== Unincorporated towns ===
- Bluff Springs

(This list is based on USGS data and may include former settlements.)

=== Cemeteries ===
The township contains these seven cemeteries: Beard, Carr, Dupes, Hager, Lee, McLane and Wells.

=== Major highways ===
- Illinois Route 125

=== Rivers ===
- Little Sangamon River
- Sangamon River

=== Lakes ===
- Clear Lake 40°03′02″N 90°18′32″W
- Cottonwood Lake
- Eagle Lake

== Demographics ==
Historical population
Census	Pop.	Note	%±
1930	906		—
1940	783		−13.6%
1950	707		−9.7%
1960	507		−28.3%
1970	607		19.7%
1980	720		18.6%
1990	751		4.3%
2000	856		14.0%
2010	888		3.7%
2020	886		−0.2%
U.S. Decennial Census

As of the 2020 census there were 886 people, 219 households, and 177 families residing in the township. The population density was 14.87 inhabitants per square mile (5.74/km^{2}). There were 384 housing units at an average density of 6.44 per square mile (2.49/km^{2}). The racial makeup of the township was 90.41% White, 0.00% African American, 0.45% Native American, 0.45% Asian, 0.45% Pacific Islander, 5.76% from other races, and 2.48% from two or more races. Hispanic or Latino of any race were 10.16% of the population.

There were 219 households, out of which 42.00% had children under the age of 18 living with them, 65.30% were married couples living together, 11.42% had a female householder with no spouse present, and 19.18% were non-families. 7.80% of all households were made up of individuals, and 5.00% had someone living alone who was 65 years of age or older. The average household size was 2.62 and the average family size was 2.74.

The township's age distribution consisted of 18.5% under the age of 18, 6.7% from 18 to 24, 21.2% from 25 to 44, 41.6% from 45 to 64, and 12.0% who were 65 years of age or older. The median age was 46.8 years. For every 100 females, there were 120.4 males. For every 100 females age 18 and over, there were 112.5 males.

The median income for a household in the township was $84,276, and the median income for a family was $83,750. Males had a median income of $53,523 versus $32,500 for females. The per capita income for the township was $34,518. About 7.3% of families and 12.8% of the population were below the poverty line, including 11.7% of those under age 18 and 24.3% of those age 65 or over.

== School districts ==
- A-C Central Community Unit School District 262
- Beardstown Community Unit School District 15
- Virginia Community Unit School District 64

== Political districts ==
- Illinois's 18th congressional district
- State House District 93
- State Senate District 47
