= Gurney, Illinois =

- Ghost town
- Location within Illinois
- Coordinates: 39°53′57″N 90°03′00″W
- Country: United States
- State: Illinois
- County: Cass
- Elevation: 630 ft (190 m)
- GNIS feature ID: 422767

Gurney is a ghost town in Cass County, Illinois, United States. Gurney was located in Ashland Township, on Illinois Route 125 between Philadelphia and Ashland.
