= Arenzville Township, Cass County, Illinois =

Arenzville Township
- Township
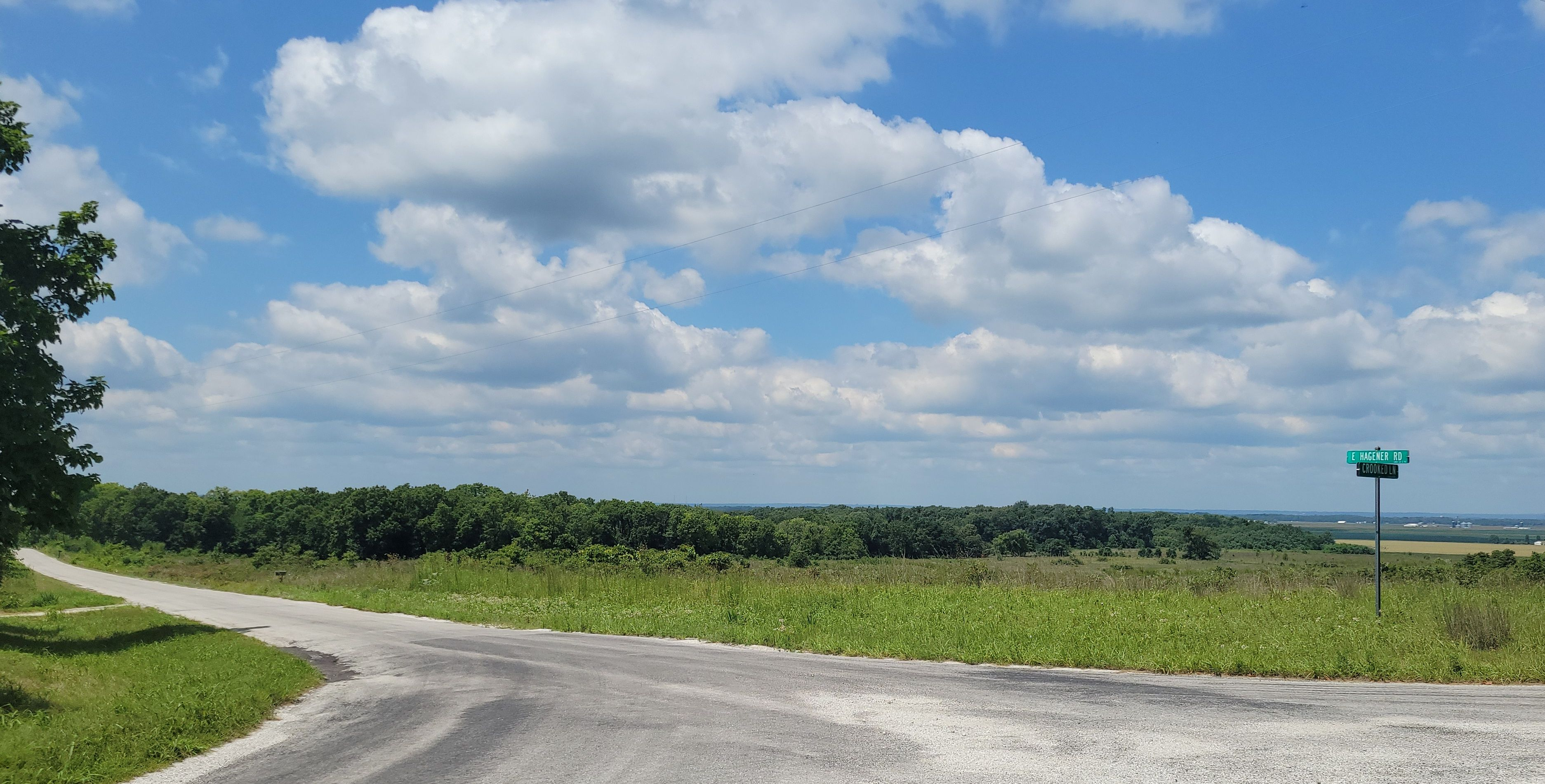
- Township road intersection overlooking Illinois River valley

- Location in Cass County

- Cass County's location in Illinois
- Coordinates: 39°55′14″N 90°20′06″W
- Country: United States
- State: Illinois
- County: Cass
- Established: November 6, 1923

Area
  - Total: 36.57 sq mi (94.7 km^{2})
  - Land: 36.57 sq mi (94.7 km^{2})
  - Water: 0 sq mi (0 km^{2}) 0%
- Elevation: 581 ft (177 m)

Population (2020)
  - Total: 742
  - Density: 20.3/sq mi (7.83/km^{2})
- Time zone: UTC-6 (CST)
  - Summer (DST): UTC-5 (CDT)
- ZIP codes: 62611, 62618, 62691
- FIPS code: 17-017-01959

Arenzville Township is one of eleven townships in Cass County, Illinois, USA. As of the 2020 census, its population was 742 and it contained 340 housing units.

== Geography ==
According to the 2010 census, the township has a total area of 36.57 square miles (94.7 km^{2}), all land.

=== Cities, towns, villages ===
- Arenzville

=== Cemeteries ===
The township contains these thirteen cemeteries: Arenzville City East, Arenzville City North, Buck, Green-Krohe, Huffman, James Davis, Jockisch Methodist, Krohe, Monroe, Treadway-Miller, Trinity Lutheran, Tureman and Wiggens.

== Demographics ==
Historical population
Census	Pop.	Note	%±
1930	1,208		—
1940	1,181		−2.2%
1950	1,075		−9.0%
1960	929		−13.6%
1970	834		−10.2%
1980	1,020		22.3%
1990	857		−16.0%
2000	839		−2.1%
2010	760		−9.4%
2020	742		−2.4%
U.S. Decennial Census

As of the 2020 census there were 742 people, 332 households, and 264 families residing in the township. The population density was 20.21 inhabitants per square mile (7.80/km^{2}). There were 340 housing units at an average density of 9.26 per square mile (3.58/km^{2}). The racial makeup of the township was 94.07% White, 1.08% African American, 0.00% Native American, 0.00% Asian, 0.13% Pacific Islander, 0.94% from other races, and 3.77% from two or more races. Hispanic or Latino of any race were 2.83% of the population.

There were 332 households, out of which 24.10% had children under the age of 18 living with them, 75.90% were married couples living together, 1.51% had a female householder with no spouse present, and 20.48% were non-families. 16.90% of all households were made up of individuals, and 6.00% had someone living alone who was 65 years of age or older. The average household size was 2.33 and the average family size was 2.59.

The township's age distribution consisted of 21.1% under the age of 18, 2.7% from 18 to 24, 28.5% from 25 to 44, 19.1% from 45 to 64, and 28.6% who were 65 years of age or older. The median age was 43.3 years. For every 100 females, there were 126.0 males. For every 100 females age 18 and over, there were 116.3 males.

The median income for a household in the township was $66,250, and the median income for a family was $69,375. Males had a median income of $45,772 versus $35,000 for females. The per capita income for the township was $34,202. About 0.8% of families and 2.3% of the population were below the poverty line, including 0.0% of those under age 18 and 0.5% of those age 65 or over.

== School districts ==
- Beardstown Community Unit School District 15
- Triopia Community Unit School District 27
- Virginia Community Unit School District 64

== Political districts ==
- Illinois' 18th congressional district
- State House District 93
- State Senate District 47
