= Panther Creek Township, Cass County, Illinois =

Panther Creek Township
- Township
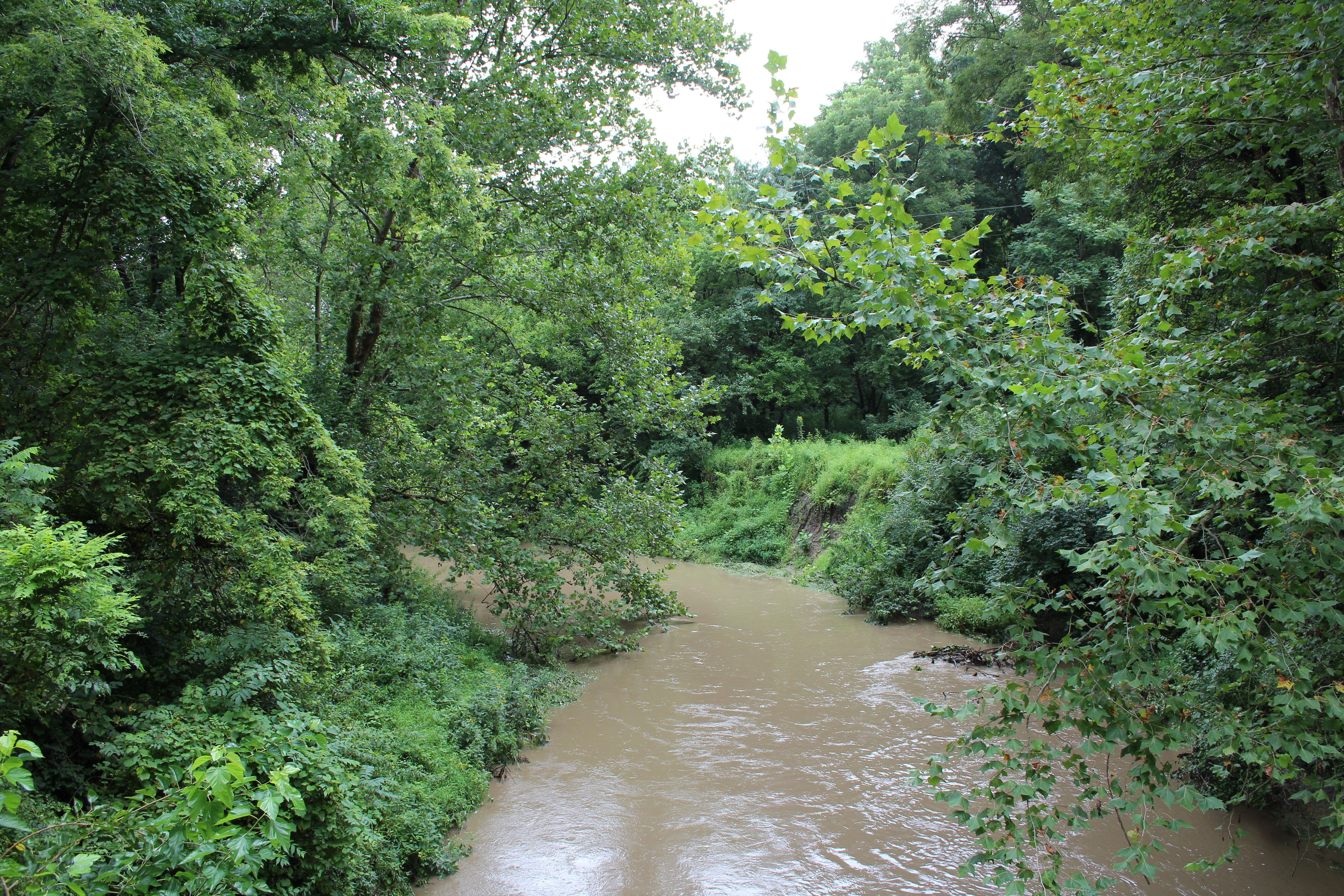
- Section of Panther Creek in Panther Creek Township

- Location in Cass County

- Cass County's location in Illinois
- Coordinates: 40°00′10″N 90°06′22″W
- Country: United States
- State: Illinois
- County: Cass
- Established: November 6, 1923

Area
  - Total: 35.57 sq mi (92.1 km^{2})
  - Land: 35.49 sq mi (91.9 km^{2})
  - Water: 0.07 sq mi (0.18 km^{2}) 0.20%
- Elevation: 604 ft (184 m)

Population (2020)
  - Total: 306
  - Density: 8.62/sq mi (3.33/km^{2})
- Time zone: UTC-6 (CST)
  - Summer (DST): UTC-5 (CDT)
- ZIP codes: 62627, 62691
- FIPS code: 17-017-57550

Panther Creek Township is one of eleven townships in Cass County, Illinois, USA. As of the 2020 census, its population was 306 and it contained 149 housing units.

== Geography ==
According to the 2010 census, the township has a total area of 35.57 square miles (92.1 km^{2}), of which 35.49 square miles (91.9 km^{2}) (or 99.78%) is land and 0.07 square miles (0.18 km^{2}) (or 0.20%) is water.

=== Cities, towns, villages ===
- Chandlerville (southeast half)

=== Unincorporated towns ===
- Palmerton
- Sylvan (historical)
- Panther Creek (historical) It is indicated on an 1839 map as a town that is east of present-day Chandlerville on what is now known as Chandlerville Road. The 1839 road was a sulky road; a sulky is a carriage seating only one person.

(This list is based on USGS data and may include former settlements.)

=== Cemeteries ===
The township contains these four cemeteries: Allendale, Bell, Chandlerville City and Pontiac.

=== Major highways ===
- Illinois Route 78

=== Landmarks ===
- Panther Creek Conservation Area (east quarter)
- Panther Creek State Wildlife Refuge

== Demographics ==
Historical population
Census	Pop.	Note	%±
1930	849		—
1940	810		−4.6%
1950	680		−16.0%
1960	565		−16.9%
1970	471		−16.6%
1980	457		−3.0%
1990	289		−36.8%
2000	365		26.3%
2010	291		−20.3%
2020	306		5.2%
U.S. Decennial Census

As of the 2020 census there were 306 people, 75 households, and 55 families residing in the township. The population density was 8.58 inhabitants per square mile (3.31/km^{2}). There were 149 housing units at an average density of 4.18 per square mile (1.61/km^{2}). The racial makeup of the township was 96.08% White, 0.00% African American, 0.33% Native American, 1.63% Asian, 0.00% Pacific Islander, 0.33% from other races, and 1.63% from two or more races. Hispanic or Latino of any race were 0.33% of the population.

There were 75 households, out of which 20.00% had children under the age of 18 living with them, 69.33% were married couples living together, 4.00% had a female householder with no spouse present, and 26.67% were non-families. 24.00% of all households were made up of individuals, and 12.00% had someone living alone who was 65 years of age or older. The average household size was 2.19 and the average family size was 2.56.

The township's age distribution consisted of 11.6% under the age of 18, 4.3% from 18 to 24, 17.7% from 25 to 44, 51.9% from 45 to 64, and 14.6% who were 65 years of age or older. The median age was 51.1 years. For every 100 females, there were 110.3 males. For every 100 females age 18 and over, there were 113.2 males.

The median income for a household in the township was $100,156, and the median income for a family was $120,313. Males had a median income of $51,181 versus $51,071 for females. The per capita income for the township was $45,945. No families and 1.2% of the population were below the poverty line.

== School districts ==
- A-C Central Community Unit School District 262
- Virginia Community Unit School District 64

== Political districts ==
- Illinois' 18th congressional district
- State House District 93
- State Senate District 47
