= Ashland Township, Cass County, Illinois =

Ashland Township
- Township
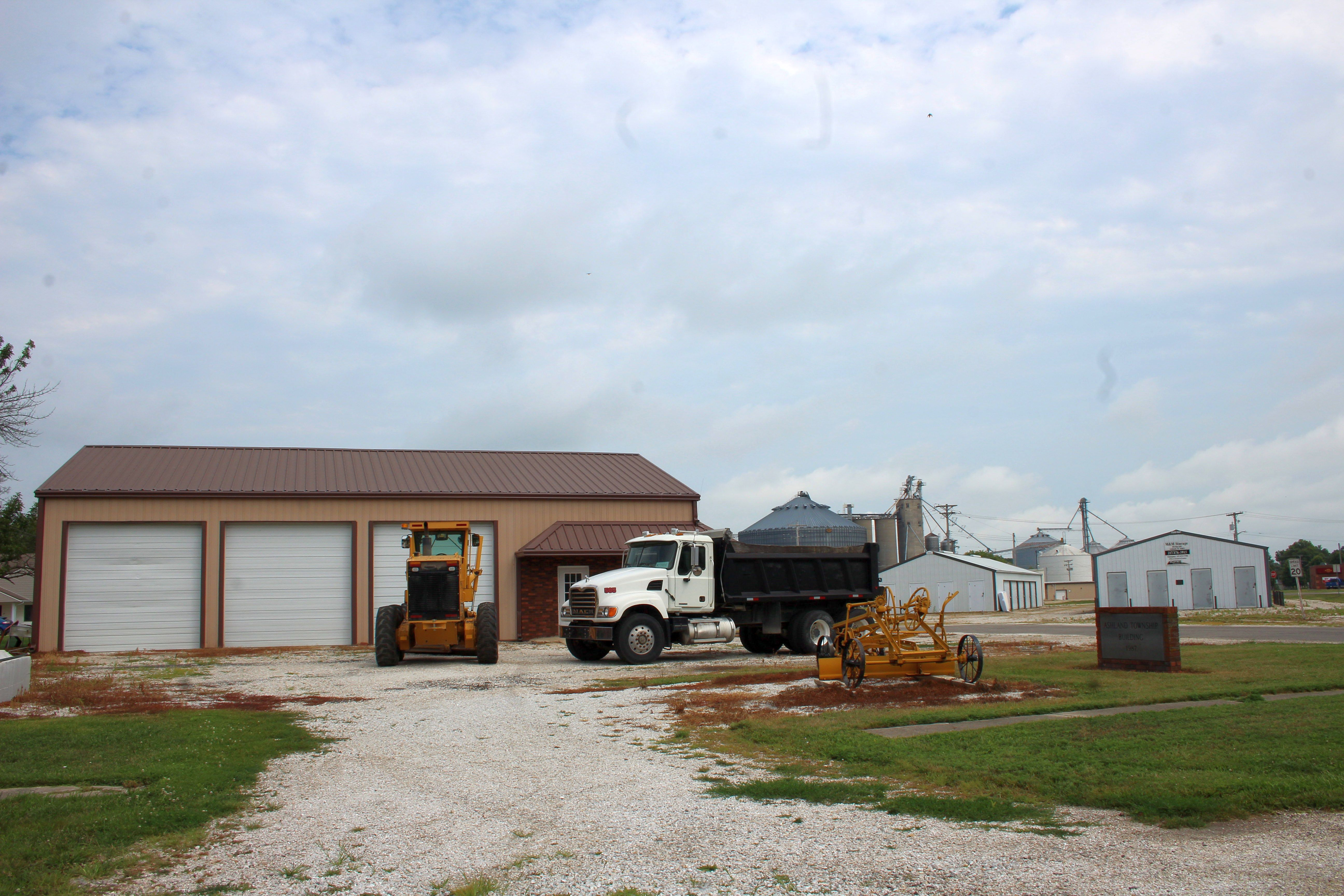
- Ashland Township building in Ashland, featuring historic pull-type road grader

- Location in Cass County

- Cass County's location in Illinois
- Coordinates: 39°55′06″N 90°01′56″W
- Country: United States
- State: Illinois
- County: Cass
- Established: November 6, 1923

Area
  - Total: 17.96 sq mi (46.5 km^{2})
  - Land: 17.96 sq mi (46.5 km^{2})
  - Water: 0 sq mi (0 km^{2}) 0%
- Elevation: 636 ft (194 m)

Population (2020)
  - Total: 1,282
  - Density: 71.38/sq mi (27.56/km^{2})
- Time zone: UTC-6 (CST)
  - Summer (DST): UTC-5 (CDT)
- ZIP codes: 62612, 62691
- FIPS code: 17-017-02518

Ashland Township is one of eleven townships in Cass County, Illinois, USA. As of the 2020 census, its population was 1,282 and it contained 603 housing units.

== Geography ==
According to the 2010 census, the township has a total area of 17.96 square miles (46.5 km^{2}), all land.

=== Cities, towns, villages ===
- Ashland

=== Unincorporated towns ===
- Gurney (historical)

(This list is based on USGS data and may include former settlements.)

=== Cemeteries ===
The township contains these four cemeteries: Ashland City, Cooper, Crow and Saint Augustine Catholic.

=== Major highways ===
- Illinois Route 125

== Demographics ==
Historical population
Census	Pop.	Note	%±
1930	1,265		—
1940	1,374		8.6%
1950	1,247		−9.2%
1960	1,256		0.7%
1970	1,262		0.5%
1980	1,479		17.2%
1990	1,356		−8.3%
2000	1,440		6.2%
2010	1,398		−2.9%
2020	1,282		−8.3%
U.S. Decennial Census

As of the 2020 census there were 1,282 people, 545 households, and 381 families residing in the township. The population density was 71.40 inhabitants per square mile (27.57/km^{2}). There were 603 housing units at an average density of 33.59 per square mile (12.97/km^{2}). The racial makeup of the township was 94.70% White, 0.70% African American, 0.55% Native American, 0.23% Asian, 0.00% Pacific Islander, 0.16% from other races, and 3.67% from two or more races. Hispanic or Latino of any race were 0.23% of the population.

There were 545 households, out of which 28.80% had children under the age of 18 living with them, 43.49% were married couples living together, 21.65% had a female householder with no spouse present, and 30.09% were non-families. 27.50% of all households were made up of individuals, and 14.90% had someone living alone who was 65 years of age or older. The average household size was 2.34 and the average family size was 2.76.

The township's age distribution consisted of 22.4% under the age of 18, 8.6% from 18 to 24, 21.2% from 25 to 44, 30.8% from 45 to 64, and 17.1% who were 65 years of age or older. The median age was 43.3 years. For every 100 females, there were 87.1 males. For every 100 females age 18 and over, there were 80.0 males.

The median income for a household in the township was $59,826, and the median income for a family was $67,917. Males had a median income of $46,310 versus $36,467 for females. The per capita income for the township was $33,829. About 3.7% of families and 5.3% of the population were below the poverty line, including 3.6% of those under age 18 and 5.5% of those age 65 or over.

== School districts ==
- A-C Central Community Unit School District 262

== Political districts ==
- Illinois' 18th congressional district
- State House District 93
- State Senate District 47
