= Virginia Township, Cass County, Illinois =

Virginia Township
- Township
- Location in Cass County

- Cass County's location in Illinois
- Coordinates: 39°55′15″N 90°13′20″W
- Country: United States
- State: Illinois
- County: Cass
- Established: November 6, 1923

Area
  - Total: 35.78 sq mi (92.7 km^{2})
  - Land: 35.76 sq mi (92.6 km^{2})
  - Water: 0.02 sq mi (0.052 km^{2}) 0.06%
- Elevation: 620 ft (189 m)

Population (2020)
  - Total: 1,691
  - Density: 47.29/sq mi (18.26/km^{2})
- Time zone: UTC-6 (CST)
  - Summer (DST): UTC-5 (CDT)
- ZIP codes: 62611, 62691
- FIPS code: 17-017-78214

Virginia Township is one of eleven townships in Cass County, Illinois, USA. As of the 2020 census, its population was 1,691 and it contained 802 housing units.

== Geography ==
According to the 2010 census, the township has a total area of 35.78 square miles (92.7 km^{2}), of which 35.76 square miles (92.6 km^{2}) (or 99.94%) is land and 0.02 square miles (0.052 km^{2}) (or 0.06%) is water.

=== Cities, towns, villages ===
- Virginia (vast majority)

=== Unincorporated towns ===
- Little Indian

(This list is based on USGS data and may include former settlements.)

=== Cemeteries ===
The township contains these nine cemeteries: Berry, Bethlehem, Clark, John Epler Taylor, Levi Springer, Robinson, Stephenson, William Nisbet and Zion.

=== Major highways ===
- Illinois Route 78
- Illinois Route 125

=== Landmarks ===
- Dunaway Park

== Demographics ==
As of the 2020 census there were 1,691 people, 668 households, and 433 families residing in the township. The population density was 47.39 inhabitants per square mile (18.30/km^{2}). There were 802 housing units at an average density of 22.47 per square mile (8.68/km^{2}). The racial makeup of the township was 92.31% White, 0.71% African American, 0.47% Native American, 0.24% Asian, 0.12% Pacific Islander, 1.30% from other races, and 4.85% from two or more races. Hispanic or Latino of any race were 4.26% of the population.

There were 668 households, out of which 30.20% had children under the age of 18 living with them, 44.76% were married couples living together, 10.18% had a female householder with no spouse present, and 35.18% were non-families. 27.40% of all households were made up of individuals, and 10.80% had someone living alone who was 65 years of age or older. The average household size was 2.28 and the average family size was 2.74.

The township's age distribution consisted of 23.5% under the age of 18, 8.7% from 18 to 24, 22.4% from 25 to 44, 27.9% from 45 to 64, and 17.6% who were 65 years of age or older. The median age was 40.8 years. For every 100 females, there were 89.9 males. For every 100 females age 18 and over, there were 89.1 males.

The median income for a household in the township was $50,521, and the median income for a family was $54,861. Males had a median income of $41,250 versus $30,272 for females. The per capita income for the township was $28,222. About 21.2% of families and 18.2% of the population were below the poverty line, including 27.8% of those under age 18 and 8.4% of those age 65 or over.

Historical population
Census	Pop.	Note	%±
2010	1,827		—
2020	1,691		−7.4%
U.S. Decennial Census

== School districts ==
- Virginia Community Unit School District 64

== Political districts ==
- Illinois' 18th congressional district
- State House District 93
- State Senate District 47
