= Hagener Township, Cass County, Illinois =

Hagener Township
- Township
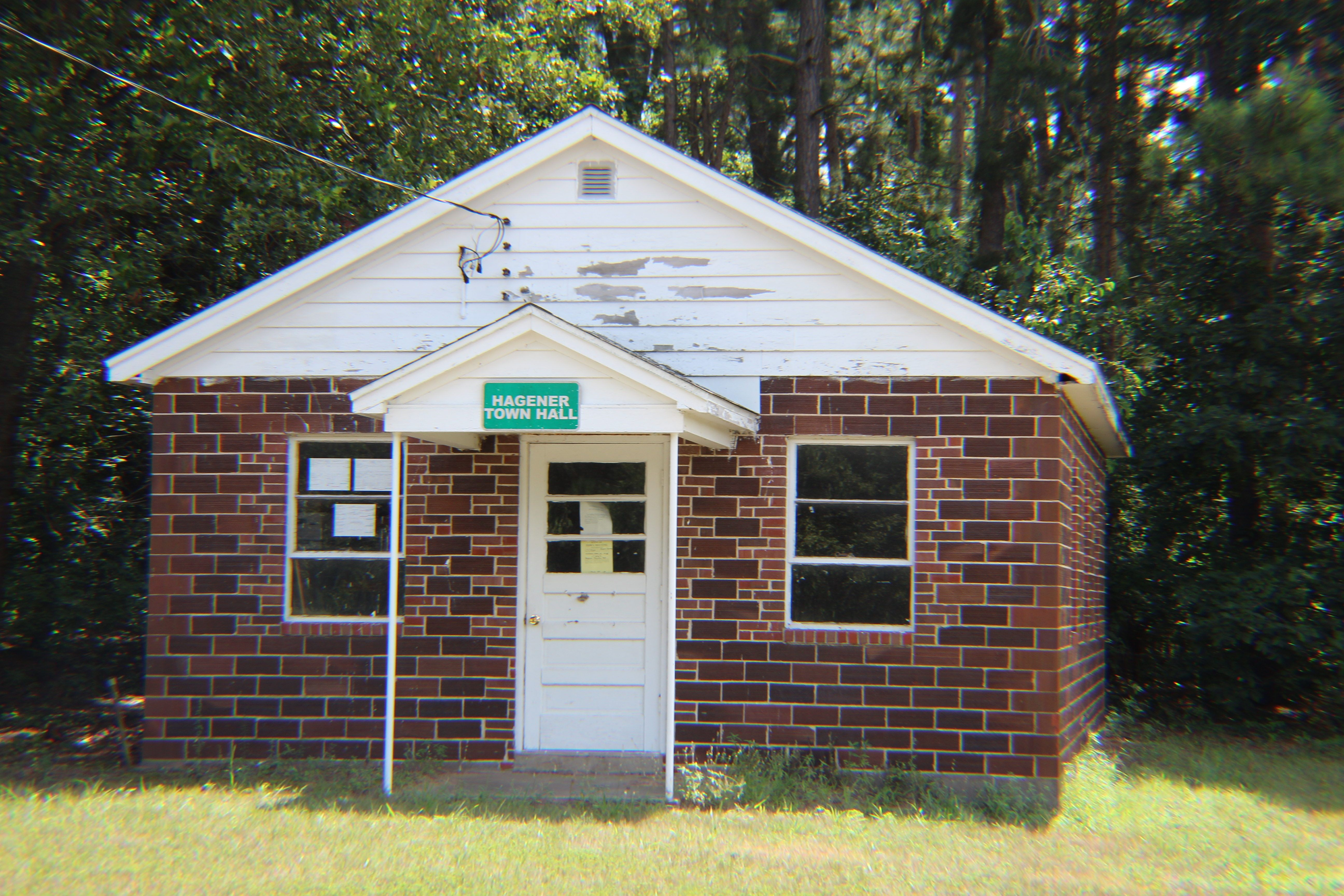
- Township building

- Location in Cass County

- Cass County's location in Illinois
- Coordinates: 39°55′15″N 90°27′42″W
- Country: United States
- State: Illinois
- County: Cass
- Established: November 6, 1923

Area
  - Total: 49.75 sq mi (128.9 km^{2})
  - Land: 47.95 sq mi (124.2 km^{2})
  - Water: 1.8 sq mi (4.7 km^{2}) 3.62%
- Elevation: 453 ft (138 m)

Population (2020)
  - Total: 352
  - Density: 7.34/sq mi (2.83/km^{2})
- Time zone: UTC-6 (CST)
  - Summer (DST): UTC-5 (CDT)
- ZIP codes: 62611, 62618
- FIPS code: 17-017-32148

Hagener Township is one of eleven townships in Cass County, Illinois, USA. As of the 2020 census, its population was 352 and it contained 157 housing units.

== Geography ==
According to the 2010 census, the township has a total area of 49.75 square miles (128.9 km^{2}), of which 47.95 square miles (124.2 km^{2}) (or 96.38%) is land and 1.8 square miles (4.7 km^{2}) (or 3.62%) is water.

=== Unincorporated towns ===
- Hagener

(This list is based on USGS data and may include former settlements.)

=== Cemeteries ===
The township contains these seven cemeteries: Black Oak, Bush, Hackman, Immanuel Lutheran, Saint Peters Lutheran, Schneider and Wagle.

=== Major highways ===
- US Route 67
- Illinois Route 100

=== Airports and landing strips ===
- Kinsey RLA Airport
- Kloker Airport
- Phillip H Krohe Airport

=== Rivers ===
- Illinois River

=== Lakes ===
- Meredosia Lake

== Demographics ==
Historical population
Census	Pop.	Note	%±
1930	627		—
1940	644		2.7%
1950	479		−25.6%
1960	395		−17.5%
1970	396		0.3%
1980	456		15.2%
1990	432		−5.3%
2000	406		−6.0%
2010	381		−6.2%
2020	352		−7.6%
U.S. Decennial Census

As of the 2020 census there were 352 people, 147 households, and 134 families residing in the township. The population density was 7.08 inhabitants per square mile (2.73/km^{2}). There were 157 housing units at an average density of 3.16 per square mile (1.22/km^{2}). The racial makeup of the township was 86.93% White, 0.57% African American, 0.57% Native American, 0.57% Asian, 0.28% Pacific Islander, 5.97% from other races, and 5.11% from two or more races. Hispanic or Latino of any race were 10.51% of the population.

There were 147 households, out of which 46.90% had children under the age of 18 living with them, 89.12% were married couples living together, 0.00% had a female householder with no spouse present, and 8.84% were non-families. 2.00% of all households were made up of individuals, and 2.00% had someone living alone who was 65 years of age or older. The average household size was 3.58 and the average family size was 3.72.

The township's age distribution consisted of 35.9% under the age of 18, 2.5% from 18 to 24, 25.9% from 25 to 44, 19.4% from 45 to 64, and 16.3% who were 65 years of age or older. The median age was 35.5 years. For every 100 females, there were 84.6 males. For every 100 females age 18 and over, there were 111.9 males.

The median income for a household in the township was $107,656, and the median income for a family was $109,688. Males had a median income of $49,018 versus $39,143 for females. The per capita income for the township was $25,872. About 1.5% of families and 3.2% of the population were below the poverty line, including 0.0% of those under age 18 and 5.8% of those age 65 or over.

== School districts ==
- Beardstown Community Unit School District 15
- Meredosia-Chambersburg Community Unit School District 11
- Triopia Community Unit School District 27

== Political districts ==
- Illinois' 18th congressional district
- State House District 93
- State Senate District 47
