= Beardstown Township, Cass County, Illinois =

Beardstown Township
- Township
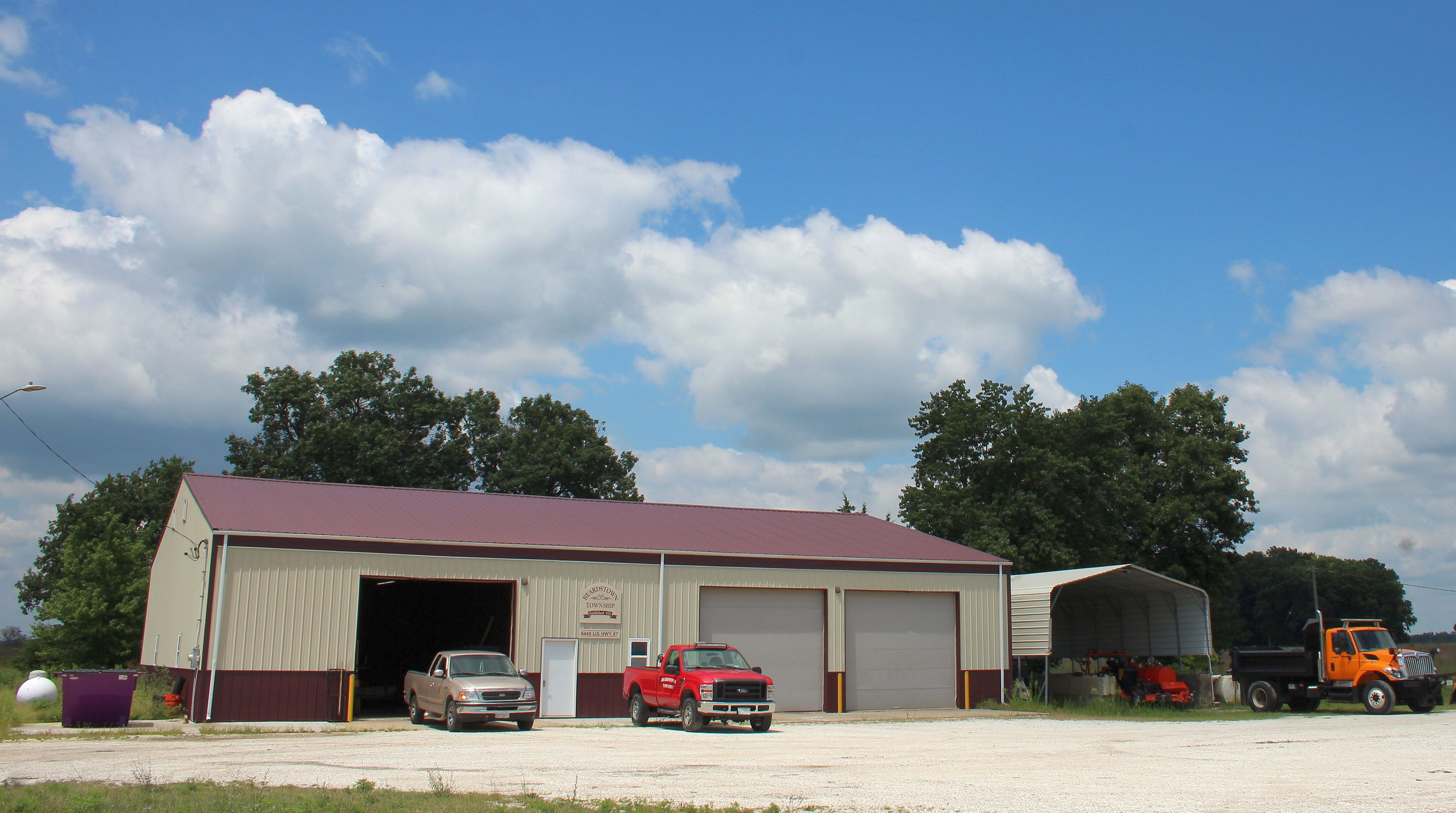
- Township building

- Location in Cass County

- Cass County's location in Illinois
- Coordinates: 40°00′08″N 90°26′05″W
- Country: United States
- State: Illinois
- County: Cass
- Established: November 6, 1923

Area
  - Total: 29.24 sq mi (75.7 km^{2})
  - Land: 25.61 sq mi (66.3 km^{2})
  - Water: 3.63 sq mi (9.4 km^{2}) 12.41%
- Elevation: 443 ft (135 m)

Population (2020)
  - Total: 6,719
  - Density: 262.4/sq mi (101.3/km^{2})
- Time zone: UTC-6 (CST)
  - Summer (DST): UTC-5 (CDT)
- ZIP codes: 62618
- FIPS code: 17-017-04364

Beardstown Township is one of eleven townships in Cass County, Illinois, USA. As of the 2020 census, its population was 6,719 and it contained 2,716 housing units.

== Geography ==
According to the 2010 census, the township has a total area of 29.24 square miles (75.7 km^{2}), of which 25.61 square miles (66.3 km^{2}) (or 87.59%) is land and 3.63 square miles (9.4 km^{2}) (or 12.41%) is water.

=== City ===
The city of Beardstown was first incorporated as a town in 1837. It was reincorporated in 1896 as a city under the state's general incorporation law.

=== Unincorporated community ===
The unincorporated community of Oak Grove is located in the township.

=== Cemeteries ===
The township contains Beardstown City, Oak Grove and Otgen cemeteries.

=== Major highways ===
- US Route 67
- Illinois Route 100
- Illinois Route 125

=== Airport ===
The Greater Beardstown Airport is owned by the city.

=== River ===
From 1905 to 1915, more freshwater fish were harvested from the Illinois River than from any other in the United States, except the Columbia.

=== Lakes ===
Lilly Lake is not to be confused with the nearby Lily Lake.

== Demographics ==
Historical population
Census	Pop.	Note	%±
1930	6,983		—
1940	7,114		1.9%
1950	6,725		−5.5%
1960	6,946		3.3%
1970	6,923		−0.3%
1980	7,232		4.5%
1990	6,280		−13.2%
2000	6,611		5.3%
2010	6,983		5.6%
2020	6,719		−3.8%
U.S. Decennial Census

As of the 2020 census there were 6,719 people, 2,532 households, and 1,610 families residing in the township. The population density was 229.63 inhabitants per square mile (88.66/km^{2}). There were 2,716 housing units at an average density of 92.82 per square mile (35.84/km^{2}). The racial makeup of the township was 54.06% White, 10.25% African American, 1.56% Native American, 1.44% Asian, 0.49% Pacific Islander, 22.00% from other races, and 10.19% from two or more races. Hispanic or Latino of any race were 37.83% of the population.

There were 2,532 households, out of which 34.20% had children under the age of 18 living with them, 44.39% were married couples living together, 13.27% had a female householder with no spouse present, and 36.41% were non-families. 32.40% of all households were made up of individuals, and 17.10% had someone living alone who was 65 years of age or older. The average household size was 2.44 and the average family size was 3.07.

The township's age distribution consisted of 24.6% under the age of 18, 9.3% from 18 to 24, 26.4% from 25 to 44, 24.7% from 45 to 64, and 15.1% who were 65 years of age or older. The median age was 36.4 years. For every 100 females, there were 94.8 males. For every 100 females age 18 and over, there were 93.7 males.

The median income for a household in the township was $45,843, and the median income for a family was $52,331. Males had a median income of $37,121 versus $25,180 for females. The per capita income for the township was $21,988. About 17.1% of families and 20.5% of the population were below the poverty line, including 24.1% of those under age 18 and 12.0% of those age 65 or over.

== School district ==
The township is served by Beardstown Community Unit School District 15.

== Political districts ==
- Illinois' 18th congressional district
- State House District 93
- State Senate District 47
