= Chandlerville Township, Cass County, Illinois =

Chandlerville Township
- Township
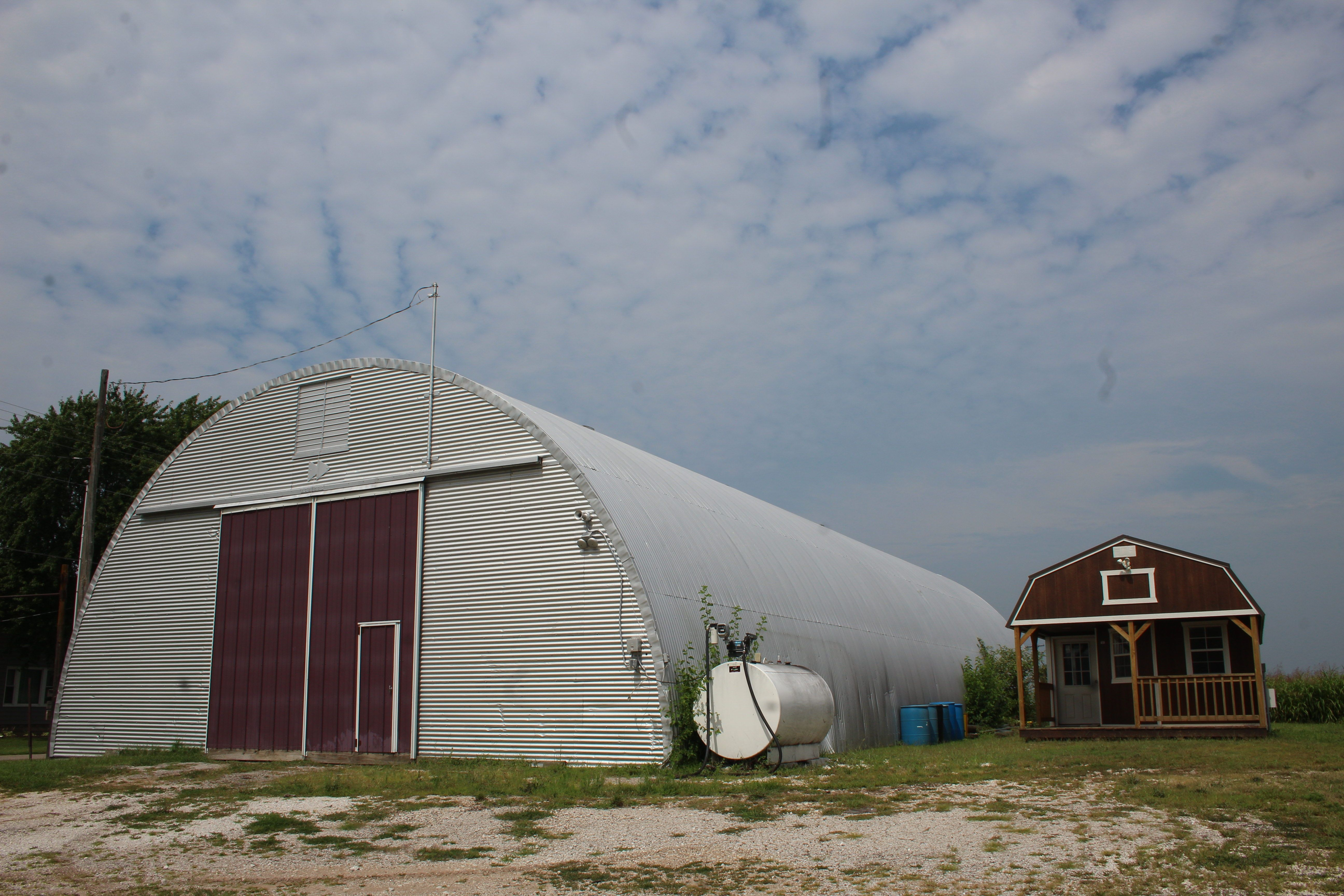
- Chandlerville/Panther Creek township building

- Location in Cass County

- Cass County's location in Illinois
- Coordinates: 40°03′58″N 90°03′31″W
- Country: United States
- State: Illinois
- County: Cass
- Established: November 6, 1923

Area
  - Total: 25.38 sq mi (65.7 km^{2})
  - Land: 25.03 sq mi (64.8 km^{2})
  - Water: 0.35 sq mi (0.91 km^{2}) 1.38%
- Elevation: 479 ft (146 m)

Population (2020)
  - Total: 458
  - Density: 18.3/sq mi (7.06/km^{2})
- Time zone: UTC-6 (CST)
  - Summer (DST): UTC-5 (CDT)
- ZIP codes: 62627, 62673
- FIPS code: 17-017-12463

Chandlerville Township is one of eleven townships in Cass County, Illinois. As of the 2020 census, its population was 458 and it contained 237 housing units.

== Geography ==
According to the 2010 census, the township has a total area of 25.38 square miles (65.7 km^{2}), of which 25.03 square miles (64.8 km^{2}) (or 98.62%) is land and 0.35 square miles (0.91 km^{2}) (or 1.38%) is water.

=== Cities, towns, villages ===
- Chandlerville (east half)

=== Cemeteries ===
The township contains these three cemeteries: Harbison-Davis, Hickey and Mount Olive.

=== Major highways ===
- Illinois Route 78

=== Rivers ===
- Sangamon River

=== Lakes ===
- Big Lake

== Demographics ==
Historical population
| Census | Pop. | Note | %± |
|---|---|---|---|
| 1930 | 894 | | — |
| 1940 | 932 | | 4.3% |
| 1950 | 835 | | −10.4% |
| 1960 | 730 | | −12.6% |
| 1970 | 682 | | −6.6% |
| 1980 | 758 | | 11.1% |
| 1990 | 715 | | −5.7% |
| 2000 | 623 | | −12.9% |
| 2010 | 515 | | −17.3% |
| 2020 | 458 | | −11.1% |
U.S. Decennial Census

As of the 2020 census there were 458 people, 233 households, and 107 families residing in the township. The population density was 18.08 inhabitants per square mile (6.98/km^{2}). There were 237 housing units at an average density of 9.36 per square mile (3.61/km^{2}). The racial makeup of the township was 97.16% White, 0.66% African American, 0.00% Native American, 0.22% Asian, 0.00% Pacific Islander, 1.31% from other races, and 0.66% from two or more races. Hispanic or Latino of any race were 1.53% of the population.

There were 233 households, out of which 15.90% had children under the age of 18 living with them, 37.34% were married couples living together, 6.01% had a female householder with no spouse present, and 54.08% were non-families. 53.20% of all households were made up of individuals, and 35.20% had someone living alone who was 65 years of age or older. The average household size was 1.91 and the average family size was 2.84.

The township's age distribution consisted of 20.4% under the age of 18, 5.2% from 18 to 24, 13.9% from 25 to 44, 24.4% from 45 to 64, and 36.1% who were 65 years of age or older. The median age was 51.7 years. For every 100 females, there were 131.1 males. For every 100 females age 18 and over, there were 120.5 males.

The median income for a household in the township was $50,489, and the median income for a family was $52,188. Males had a median income of $57,708 versus $21,250 for females. The per capita income for the township was $31,023. About 9.3% of families and 18.8% of the population were below the poverty line, including 50.5% of those under age 18 and 1.9% of those age 65 or over.

== School districts ==
- A-C Central Community Unit School District 262
- Porta Community Unit School District 202

== Political districts ==
- Illinois's 18th congressional district
- State House District 93
- State Senate District 47
