= Bluff Springs =

Bluff Springs can refer to:

== Places ==
United States

- Bluff Springs, Texas
- Bluff Springs, Illinois
- Bluff Springs Township, Cass County, Illinois
