= Jules, Illinois =

- Unincorporated community
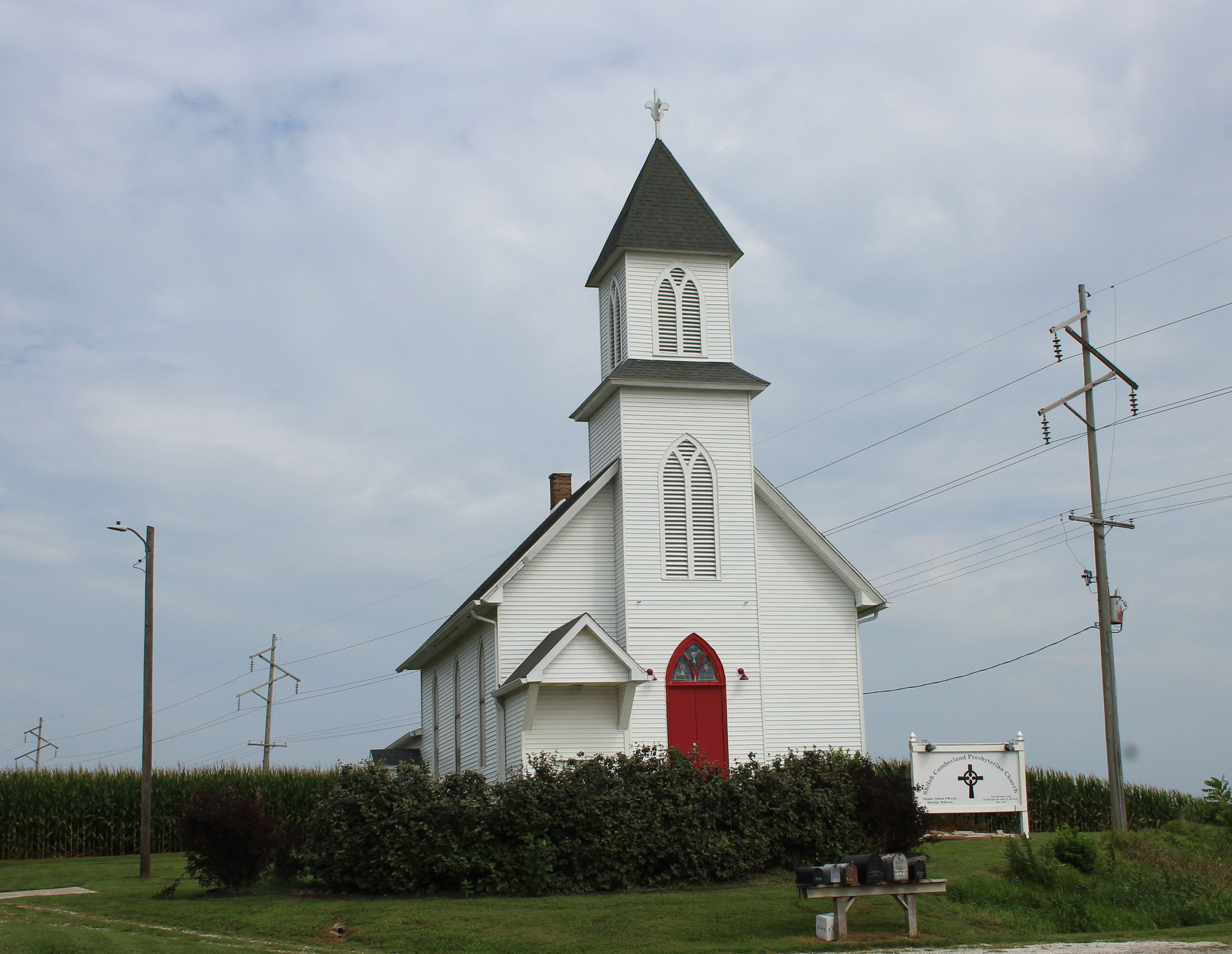
- Shiloh Cumberland Presbyterian Church at Jules

- Location within Illinois Location within the United States
- Coordinates: 39°58′05″N 90°15′37″W
- Country: United States
- State: Illinois
- County: Cass
- Township: Sangamon Valley
- Elevation: 614 ft (187 m)
- Time zone: UTC-6 (Central (CST))
  - Summer (DST): UTC-5 (CDT)
- Area code: 217
- GNIS feature ID: 422854

Jules is an unincorporated community in Cass County, Illinois, United States. Jules is located on Illinois Route 125, northwest of Virginia. It was formerly a stop on the Springfield Division of the Baltimore & Ohio Railroad. A post office operated there from 1885 to 1905.
