= Beardstown High School =

Public school in Cass County, Illinois, US

Beardstown Junior/Senior High School

Location
- 500 East 15th Street; Beardstown, Cass County, Illinois 62618; United States
- Coordinates: 40°0′27″N 90°25′21″W

Information
- Type: Public junior/senior high school
- School district: Beardstown Community Unit School District 15
- Principal: Bill Myers
- Teaching staff: 57.66 (FTE)
- Grades: 5–12
- Enrollment: 837 (2023–2024)
- Student to teacher ratio: 14.52
- Campus type: Small city
- Colors: Black, Orange
- Athletics conference: Western Illinois Valley
- Team name: Tigers, Lady Tigers
- PSAE average: 30%
- Feeder schools: Gard Elementary School; Grand Avenue Elementary School
- Website: www.beardstown.com

Beardstown Junior/Senior High School, also known as Beardstown Middle/High School or BHS, is a public school for grades 6 through 12 at located at 500 East 15th Street in Beardstown, Illinois, a small city in Cass County, Illinois, in the Midwestern United States. BHS is the only middle school and only high school of Beardstown Community Unit School District 15. The campus is located 45 miles northwest of Springfield, Illinois, and serves a mixed village and rural residential community. The school does not lie within a metropolitan or micropolitan statistical area.

== Academics ==
In 2009 Beardstown Middle/High School did not make Adequate Yearly Progress, with 30% of high school students meeting standards, on the Prairie State Achievement Examination, a state test that is part of the No Child Left Behind Act. However, their scores have continued to improve and they made AYP in the following years without issue. The school's average high school graduation rate between 1999–2009 was 92%.

== Athletics ==
Beardstown High School Mascot

The middle/high school runs numerous athletics programs that differ based on the season. For example; football, golf, cheerleading, boys soccer and cross country all meet in the fall. Basketball, wrestling, and volleyball all meet in the winter. Baseball, track, girls soccer and softball all meet in the spring.

Beardstown High School competes in the West Central Conference and is a member school in the Illinois High School Association. The BHS mascot is the Tigers, with school colors of orange and black. The school has no state championships on record in team athletics and activities.

== Notable alumni ==
- Jesse Wallace (1899-1961), Rear admiral, U.S. Navy and Governor of American Samoa in 1940
