= Senator Leeper =

Senator Leeper may refer to:

- Arthur A. Leeper (1855–1931), Illinois State Senate
- Bob Leeper (born 1958), Kentucky State Senate
