= Arthur A. Leeper =

American lawyer and politician

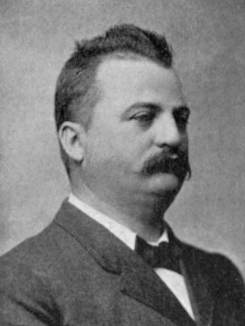

Member of the Illinois Senate
- In office 1889–1901

Personal details
- Born: August 21, 1855 Cass County, Illinois, US
- Died: December 22, 1931 (aged 76) Clinton, Illinois, US
- Party: Democratic
- Education: Eureka College; University of Iowa College of Law
- Occupation: Lawyer

Arthur A. Leeper (August 21, 1855 – December 22, 1931) was an American lawyer and politician.

== Biography ==
Leeper was born near Chandlerville, Cass County, Illinois. He went to the public schools. Lepper went to Eureka College and to University of Iowa College of Law. He lived in Virginia, Illinois with his wife and family. Leeper served as state's attorney for Cass County. He served in the Illinois Senate from 1889 to 1901 and was a Democrat. He died at his daughter's home in Clinton, Illinois.
