= Jim Edgar Panther Creek State Fish and Wildlife Area =

State park in Illinois, US

- IUCN category IV (habitat/species management area)
- Location within Illinois Location within the United States
- Location: Cass County, Illinois, USA
- Nearest city: Chandlerville, Illinois
- Coordinates: 40°00′15″N 90°10′00″W
- Area: 16,550 acres (6,698 ha)
- Established: June, 1993
- Governing body: Illinois Department of Natural Resources

The Jim Edgar Panther Creek State Fish and Wildlife Area (JEPC) is a conservation area located within Cass County in the U.S. state of Illinois. It is 16,550 acres (6,698 ha) in size. A mix of plowed upland prairie and Panther Creek woodlands, the site is managed by the Illinois Department of Natural Resources. It is drained by the Sangamon River. It is named for former Governor of Illinois Jim Edgar.

== History ==
Originally part of the territory controlled by the Illinois Confederacy of Native Americans, the Panther Creek basin was largely settled by the 1850s. As the basin is adjacent to the historic road between Springfield, Illinois and Beardstown, Illinois, now Illinois Route 125, it was relatively attractive as farmland.

Acting on the basis of rapidly increasing forecasts in Illinois demand for electricity, the Chicago-based electric utility, Commonwealth Edison, purchased farmland making up the future Jim Edgar site in 1968-74 for potential use as a coal-fired generating plant and adjacent 5,000-acre (2,023 ha) cooling pond. For this purpose the parcel was renamed "Site M".

The "Site M" power plant would have burned high-sulfur Illinois coal. Due to the passage of the federal Clean Air Act, the use of Illinois coal for electrical power purposes became less economically attractive to Commonwealth Edison in the 1980s and 1990s. After holding the land in 1974-1993, the utility agreed to sell it to the state of Illinois.

== Today ==
The Illinois Department of Natural Resources acquired "Site M" in June 1993, and the acquisition became the largest portion of what was renamed the Jim Edgar Panther Creek State Fish and Wildlife Area (JEPC) in 2001. The site was named in honor of Jim Edgar, governor of Illinois in 1991-1999.

Of the 16,550 acres (67 km^{2}) within JEPC, 6,350 acres (2,570 ha) are managed as open space, 6,000 acres (24 km^{2}) are managed as woodland and 4,200 acres (1,700 ha) are managed as production farmland. The production farmland is leased out to local farmers, a move that has caused some controversy. It can be up to a Class B misdemeanor to trespass upon Illinois land used for production agriculture, and that penalty applies to JEPC land in production, even though the land is owned by all of the people of Illinois.

The Jim Edgar Panther Creek parcel, however, makes up more than half of Panther Creek Township within Cass County. Allowing part of JEPC to remain as production farmland allows property taxes to be levied on the land for the support of local schools and units of government.

== Open space ==
Some primary target species for which JEPC open space are managed are mourning doves, pheasants, quail, snipe, woodcock, and rabbit. Rotating areas of grass, sunflower seeds, and wheat are managed to feed and encourage these populations, all of which can be hunted with an Illinois license.

Several small natural ponds and artificial lakes exist on the JEPC property, and are stocked with largemouth bass, channel catfish and typical Illinois farm-pond panfish such as bluegill, the Illinois state fish, and green sunfish. In addition to these fish, Prairie Lake is also stocked with muskellunge.

175 acres (0.71 km^{2}) within JEPC have been set aside as the Cox Creek Hill Prairie State Natural Area, a collection of upland hill prairie remnants scattered throughout the JEPC. 87 separate species of birds have been logged on the Cox Creek Hill Prairie parcels. In 2004, the Jim Edgar Panther Creek State Fish and Wildlife Area was designated as an Important Bird Area of Illinois.

== Woodland ==
The Jim Edgar Panther Creek site's woodland is managed for white-tailed deer and wild turkey. Furbearing animals, such as coyotes, raccoon, opossum, red fox, gray fox, and striped skunk, also live in the woodlands and adjacent open areas. Illinois hunting licenses also provide access to these species.
