= Eric Jokisch =

American baseball player (born 1989)

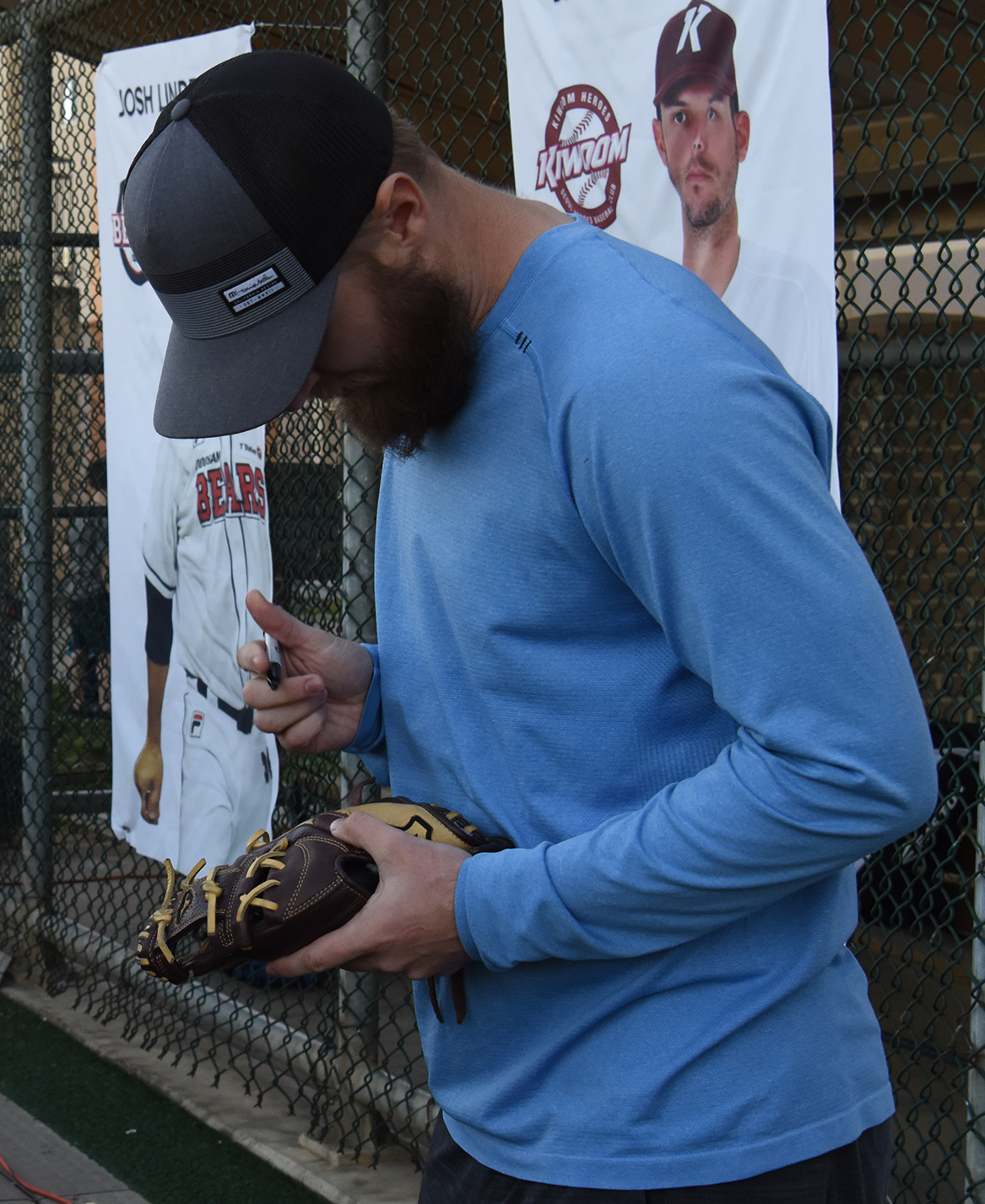
- Jokisch at Osan Air Base in 2019
- Pitcher
- Born: July 29, 1989 (age 37); Springfield, Illinois, U.S.
- Batted: Right Threw: Left

Professional debut
- MLB: September 7, 2014, for the Chicago Cubs
- KBO: March 24, 2019, for the Kiwoom Heroes

Last appearance
- MLB: September 26, 2014, for the Chicago Cubs
- KBO: September 26, 2024, for the NC Dinos

MLB statistics
- Win–loss record: 0–0
- Earned run average: 1.88
- Strikeouts: 10

KBO statistics
- Win–loss record: 59-40
- Earned run average: 2.99
- Strikeouts: 624
- Stats at Baseball Reference

Teams
- Chicago Cubs (2014); Kiwoom Heroes (2019–2023); NC Dinos (2024)

Career highlights and awards
- KBO Wins leader (2021); KBO ERA leader (2020)

Eric Spenser Jokisch (/ˈdʒoʊkɪʃ/ JOH-kish; born July 29, 1989) is an American former professional baseball pitcher. He played in Major League Baseball (MLB) for the Chicago Cubs and in the KBO League for the Kiwoom Heroes and NC Dinos.

== Career ==
=== Amateur ===
Jokisch was drafted by the Cleveland Indians in the 39th round of the 2007 Major League Baseball draft out of Virginia High School in Virginia, Illinois, but did not sign and played college baseball at Northwestern University. In 2009, he played collegiate summer baseball with the Harwich Mariners of the Cape Cod Baseball League.

=== Chicago Cubs ===
He was selected by the Chicago Cubs in the 11th round of the 2010 Major League Baseball draft and signed. In 2013, while pitching for the Tennessee Smokies, he pitched a no-hitter.

Jokisch was called up to the majors for the first time on September 2, 2014.

=== Miami Marlins ===
On April 13, 2016, Jokisch was claimed off waivers by the Miami Marlins. After one start for the Double–A Jacksonville Suns, he made 18 appearances for the Triple–A New Orleans Zephyrs, posting a 2.64 ERA with 19 strikeouts in 30 2/3 innings pitched. Jokisch was designated for assignment on July 6 following the promotion of Don Kelly. He cleared waivers and was sent outright to Double–A Jacksonville on July 8.

=== Texas Rangers ===
On July 8, 2016, the Marlins traded Jokisch to the Texas Rangers in exchange for Pedro Ciriaco. As he had been outrighted the same day, Jokisch did not occupy a spot on Texas' 40-man roster. In 7 games (4 starts) for the Triple–A Round Rock Express, he logged a 4.13 ERA with 15 strikeouts over 24 innings of work. Jokisch elected free agency following the season on November 7.

=== Arizona Diamondbacks ===
On February 26, 2017, Jokisch signed a minor league contract with the Arizona Diamondbacks organization. Jokisch spent the 2017 season with the Triple–A Reno Aces, also making 1 start for the Double–A Jackson Generals. In 28 games (21 starts) for Reno, he logged an 8–8 record and 4.21 ERA with 91 strikeouts in 134 2/3 innings pitched. He elected free agency following the season on November 6, 2017.

=== Oakland Athletics ===
On December 7, 2017, Jokisch signed a minor league contract with the Oakland Athletics organization. He spent the 2018 season with the Triple–A Nashville Sounds, making 26 appearances (23 starts) and registering a 5–11 record and 4.06 ERA with 121 strikeouts in 148 2/3 innings of work. Jokisch elected free agency after the season on November 2, 2018.

=== Kiwoom Heroes ===
On November 23, 2018, Jokisch signed a one-year, $500,000 contract with the Kiwoom Heroes of the KBO League. He produced a 13–9 record with a 3.13 ERA over 181.1 innings in 2019. Jokisch re-signed with Kiwoom for the 2020 season on a one-year contract worth $700,000. In 2020 Jokisch led the team with 159.2 innings with an ERA of 2.14, winning the league’s ERA title. He re-signed with the Heroes on a one year $900k deal for the 2021 season on December 2, 2020. Jokisch tied for the league lead in wins (16), while ranking second in innings pitched (181 1/3) and fourth in ERA (2.93).

On December 30, 2021, he re-signed with the Heroes on a one-year deal worth up to $1.3 million. Jokisch started 30 games for Kiwoom in 2022, registering a 10–8 record and 2.57 ERA with 154 strikeouts across a career–high 185 2/3 innings pitched. On December 11, 2022, Jokisch re-signed a one-year contract worth $1.5 million. He would make 12 starts for the team in 2023, logging a 5–3 record and 4.39 ERA with 51 strikeouts in 65 2/3 innings of work. In early June, Jokisch suffered a tear in his left adductor muscle and was ruled out for six weeks. Rather than wait for Jokisch to get healthy, the Heroes released him on June 16 and signed Ian McKinney.

=== NC Dinos ===
On July 31, 2024, Jokisch signed with the NC Dinos of the KBO League. In 8 starts, he posted a 3–4 record with a 5.72 ERA and 32 strikeouts over 39 1/3 innings. Jokisch became a free agent following the season.
