= Hagener, Illinois =

- Unincorporated community
- Location within Illinois Location within the United States
- Coordinates: 39°55′33″N 90°23′50″W
- Country: United States
- State: Illinois
- County: Cass
- Elevation: 476 ft (145 m)
- Time zone: UTC-6 (Central (CST))
  - Summer (DST): UTC-5 (CDT)
- Area code: 217
- GNIS feature ID: 422771

Hagener is an unincorporated community in Cass County, Illinois, United States. Hagener is located along a railroad line between Beardstown and Arenzville.
