= Philadelphia, Illinois =

- Unincorporated community
- Location within Illinois Location within the United States
- Coordinates: 39°55′26″N 90°07′02″W
- Country: United States
- State: Illinois
- County: Cass
- Elevation: 620 ft (190 m)
- Time zone: UTC-6 (Central (CST))
  - Summer (DST): UTC-5 (CDT)
- Area code: 217
- GNIS feature ID: 415602

Philadelphia is an unincorporated community in Cass County, Illinois, United States. Philadelphia is located on Illinois Route 125, southeast of Virginia. Vernon Huber, the 36th Governor of American Samoa, was born in Philadelphia.

The community was named for Philadelphia, Pennsylvania.
