= Sylvan, Illinois =

- Former settlement
- Location within Illinois
- Coordinates: 39°59′06″N 90°04′16″W
- Country: United States
- State: Illinois
- County: Cass
- Elevation: 607 ft (185 m)
- GNIS feature ID: 423227

Sylvan is a former settlement in Panther Creek Township, Cass County, Illinois, United States. Sylvan was southwest of Newmansville.

The town was populated during the mid-19th century by mostly Irish immigrants. Currently, there is one cemetery there. Sylvan is located near Jim Edgar Park.

A photo of this ghost town was briefly shown in the horror movie Silent Hill. In the film, the town was misspelled as "Sylvane".
