= Palmerton, Illinois =

- Unincorporated community
- Location within Illinois Location within the United States
- Coordinates: 40°00′02″N 90°08′56″W
- Country: United States
- State: Illinois
- County: Cass
- Elevation: 610 ft (190 m)
- Time zone: UTC-6 (Central (CST))
  - Summer (DST): UTC-5 (CDT)
- Area code: 217
- GNIS feature ID: 423053

Palmerton is an unincorporated community in Cass County, Illinois, United States. Palmerton is 4 miles (6.4 km) south of Chandlerville.
