= Old Princeton, Illinois =

- Unincorporated community
- Location within Illinois Location within the United States
- Coordinates: 39°52′41″N 90°09′50″W
- Country: United States
- State: Illinois
- County: Cass
- Elevation: 604 ft (184 m)
- Time zone: UTC-6 (Central (CST))
  - Summer (DST): UTC-5 (CDT)
- Area code: 217
- GNIS feature ID: 423039

Old Princeton is an unincorporated community in Cass County, Illinois, United States. Old Princeton is south-southeast of Virginia.
