= Little Indian, Illinois =

- Unincorporated community
- Location within Illinois Location within the United States
- Coordinates: 39°53′15″N 90°12′04″W
- Country: United States
- State: Illinois
- County: Cass
- Elevation: 600 ft (180 m)
- Time zone: UTC-6 (Central (CST))
  - Summer (DST): UTC-5 (CDT)
- Area code: 217
- GNIS feature ID: 422917

Little Indian is an unincorporated community in Cass County, Illinois, United States. Little Indian is located near Illinois Route 78, south of Virginia.
