= Kyle MacWherter =

American football player (1892–1977)

Kyle MacWheter
No. 14
- Position: Fullback

Personal information
- Born: July 19, 1892; Virginia, Illinois, U.S.
- Died: December 1977
- Listed height: 5 ft 9 in (1.75 m)
- Listed weight: 210 lb (95 kg)

Career information
- College: Bethany, Millikin

Career history
- Decatur Staleys (1920)

Career statistics
- Games played: 4
- Stats at Pro Football Reference

William Kile "Kyle" MacWherter (July 19, 1892 – December 1977) was an American professional football fullback who played one season for the Decatur Staleys of the NFL. He played college football at Bethany College and Millikin University.
