= Arenzville, Illinois =

Arenzville
- Village
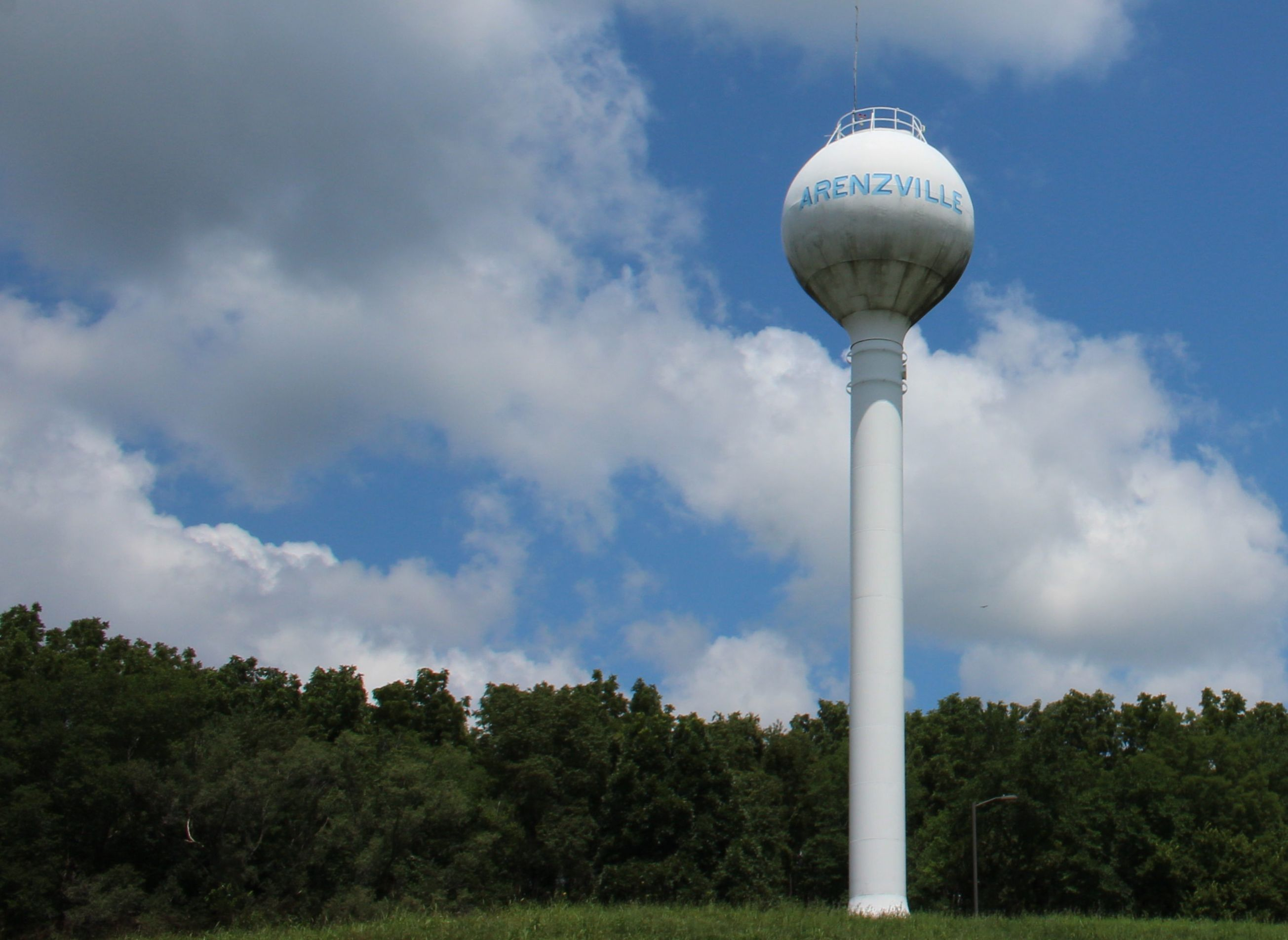
- Arenzville water tower
- Nickname: Home of the World's Best Burgoo
- Location of Arenzville in Cass County, Illinois.
- Coordinates: 39°52′40″N 90°22′15″W
- Country: United States
- State: Illinois
- County: Cass

Government
  - Village president: Ron Kershaw

Area
  - Total: 0.77 sq mi (1.99 km^{2})
  - Land: 0.77 sq mi (1.99 km^{2})
  - Water: 0 sq mi (0.00 km^{2})
- Elevation: 538 ft (164 m)

Population (2020)
  - Total: 367
  - Density: 478/sq mi (184/km^{2})
- Time zone: UTC-6 (CST)
  - Summer (DST): UTC-5 (CDT)
- ZIP code: 62611
- Area code: 217
- FIPS code: 17-01946
- GNIS feature ID: 2397981

Arenzville is a village in Cass County, Illinois, United States. The population was 367 at the 2020 census.

== Geography ==
According to the 2021 census gazetteer files, Arenzville has a total area of 0.77 square miles (1.99 km^{2}), all land.

== Demographics ==
Historical population
Census	Pop.	Note	%±
1880	379		—
1890	356		−6.1%
1900	462		29.8%
1910	518		12.1%
1920	479		−7.5%
1930	458		−4.4%
1940	494		7.9%
1950	513		3.8%
1960	417		−18.7%
1970	403		−3.4%
1980	495		22.8%
1990	432		−12.7%
2000	419		−3.0%
2010	409		−2.4%
2020	367		−10.3%
U.S. Decennial Census

As of the 2020 census there were 367 people, 151 households, and 107 families residing in the village. The population density was 477.86 inhabitants per square mile (184.50/km^{2}). There were 174 housing units at an average density of 226.56 per square mile (87.48/km^{2}). The racial makeup of the village was 94.28% White, 0.27% African American, 0.27% Pacific Islander, 1.36% from other races, and 3.81% from two or more races. Hispanic or Latino of any race were 3.54% of the population.

There were 151 households, out of which 33.8% had children under the age of 18 living with them, 62.91% were married couples living together, 3.31% had a female householder with no husband present, and 29.14% were non-families. 23.84% of all households were made up of individuals, and 7.28% had someone living alone who was 65 years of age or older. The average household size was 3.19 and the average family size was 2.65.

The village's age distribution consisted of 30.3% under the age of 18, 3.8% from 18 to 24, 26.7% from 25 to 44, 21.1% from 45 to 64, and 18.5% who were 65 years of age or older. The median age was 37.7 years. For every 100 females, there were 99.0 males. For every 100 females age 18 and over, there were 97.9 males.

The median income for a household in the village was $81,250, and the median income for a family was $86,875. Males had a median income of $51,750 versus $33,214 for females. The per capita income for the village was $30,825. About 1.9% of families and 4.5% of the population were below the poverty line, including none of those under age 18 and 1.4% of those age 65 or over.
