= Cass County, Illinois =

County in Illinois, United States

- County
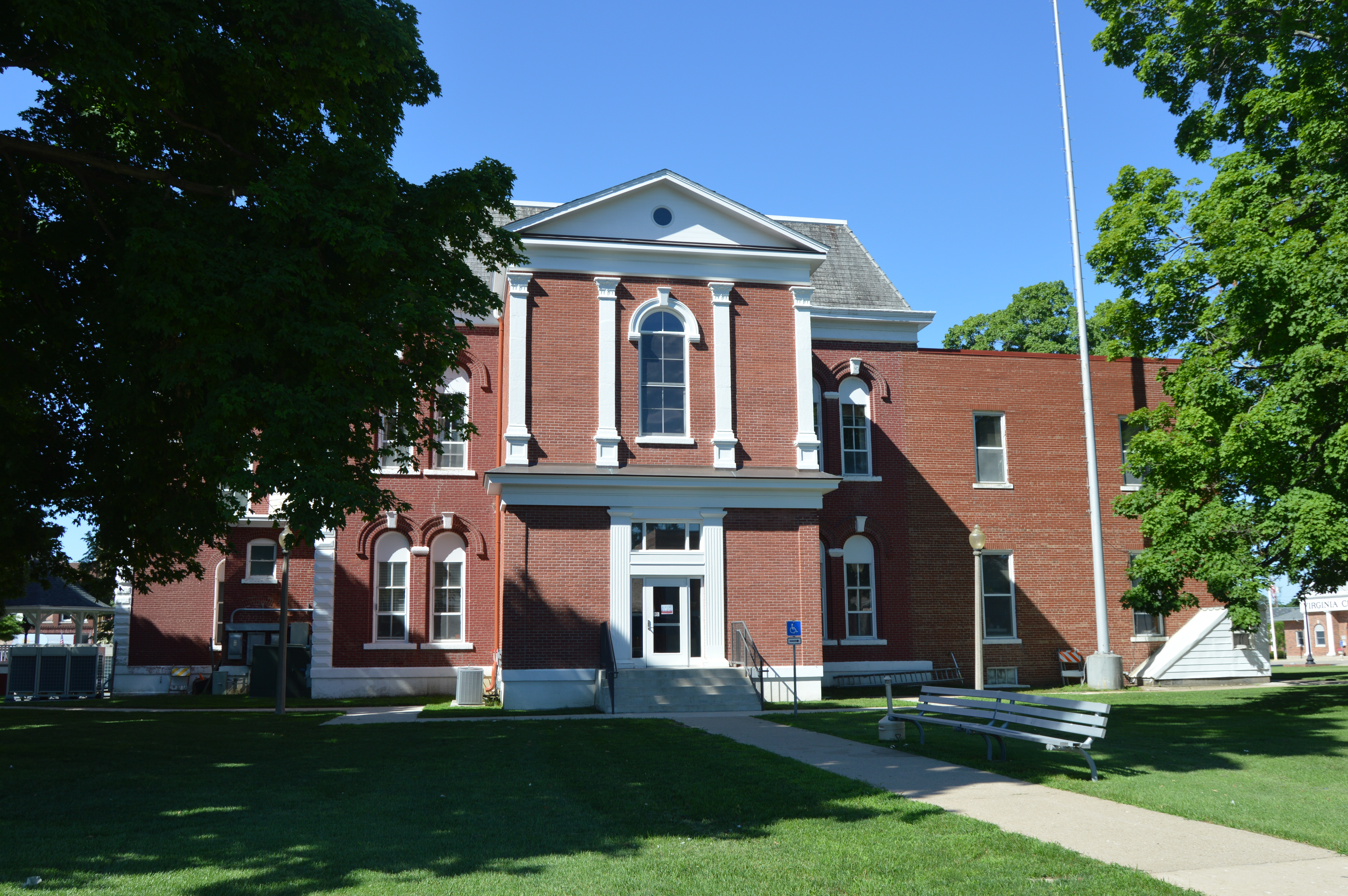
- Cass County Courthouse

- Location within the U.S. state of Illinois
- Coordinates: 39°59′N 90°15′W
- Country: United States
- State: Illinois
- Founded: 1837
- Named for: Lewis Cass
- Seat: Virginia
- Largest city: Beardstown

Area
  - Total: 384 sq mi (990 km^{2})
  - Land: 376 sq mi (970 km^{2})
  - Water: 7.9 sq mi (20 km^{2}) 2.1%

Population (2020)
  - Total: 13,042
  - Estimate (2025): 12,463 ▼
  - Density: 34.7/sq mi (13.4/km^{2})
- Time zone: UTC−6 (Central)
  - Summer (DST): UTC−5 (CDT)
- Congressional district: 15th
- Website: co.cass.il.us

Cass County is a county located in the U.S. state of Illinois. As of the 2020 United States census, the population was 13,042. Its county seat is Virginia. It is the home of the Jim Edgar Panther Creek State Fish and Wildlife Area.

== History ==
Cass County was formed in 1837 out of Morgan County. It was named for Lewis Cass, a general in the War of 1812, Governor of the Michigan Territory, and United States Secretary of State in 1860. Cass was serving as Andrew Jackson's Secretary of War just before the County was named.

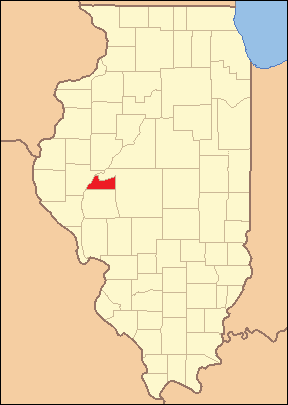
Cass County at the time of its creation.

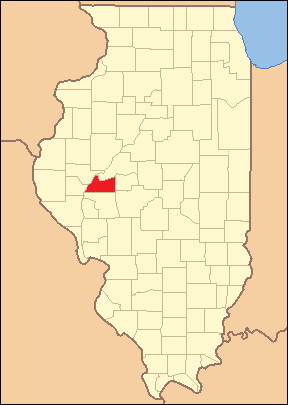
In 1845, the county's border was adjusted southward, enlarging it to its current size.

== Geography ==
According to the US Census Bureau, the county has a total area of 384 square miles (990 km^{2}), of which 376 square miles (970 km^{2}) is land and 7.9 square miles (20 km^{2}) (2.1%) is water.

=== Adjacent counties ===
- Mason County – northeast
- Menard County – east
- Sangamon County – southeast
- Morgan County – south
- Brown County – west
- Schuyler County – northwest

=== National protected area ===
- Meredosia National Wildlife Refuge (part)

=== Rivers ===
- Illinois River
- Little Sangamon River
- Sangamon River

=== Major highways ===
- US Route 67
- Illinois Route 78
- Illinois Route 100
- Illinois Route 125

== Climate and weather ==
Virginia, Illinois

Climate chart (precipitation, max. and min. temperature)
J	F	M	A	M	J	J	A	S	O	N	D
1.4 34 15	1.7 40 19	3.2 52 29	3.8 64 39	4.9 74 49	4.4 83 59	3.9 87 63	3.4 85 60	3.5 79 52	2.6 68 41	3.5 52 31	2.5 39 20
- █ Average max. and min. temperatures in °F
- █ Precipitation totals in inches
- Source: The Weather Channel
Metric conversion
J	F	M	A	M	J	J	A	S	O	N	D
34 1 −9	43 4 −7	81 11 −2	96 18 4	123 23 9	111 28 15	98 31 17	85 29 16	88 26 11	66 20 5	88 11 −1	65 4 −7
- █ Average max. and min. temperatures in °C
- █ Precipitation totals in mm

In recent years, average temperatures in the county seat of Virginia have ranged from a low of 15 °F (−9 °C) in January to a high of 87 °F (31 °C) in July, although a record low of −28 °F (−33 °C) was recorded in February 1934 and a record high of 114 °F (46 °C) was recorded in July 1954. Average monthly precipitation ranged from 1.35 inches (34 mm) in January to 4.86 inches (123 mm) in May.

== Demographics ==
Historical population
Census	Pop.	Note	%±
1840	2,981		—
1850	7,253		143.3%
1860	11,325		56.1%
1870	11,580		2.3%
1880	14,493		25.2%
1890	15,963		10.1%
1900	17,222		7.9%
1910	17,372		0.9%
1920	17,896		3.0%
1930	16,537		−7.6%
1940	16,425		−0.7%
1950	15,097		−8.1%
1960	14,539		−3.7%
1970	14,219		−2.2%
1980	15,084		6.1%
1990	13,437		−10.9%
2000	13,695		1.9%
2010	13,642		−0.4%
2020	13,042		−4.4%
2025 (est.)	12,463	▼	−4.4%
US Decennial Census; 1790-1960 1900-1990; 1990-2000 2010

2000 census age pyramid for Cass County

=== 2020 census ===
As of the 2020 census, the county had a population of 13,042. The median age was 39.0 years, with 24.7% of residents under the age of 18 and 17.2% 65 years of age or older; for every 100 females there were 99.6 males and for every 100 females age 18 and over there were 98.0 males age 18 and over.

48.0% of residents lived in urban areas while 52.0% lived in rural areas.

There were 5,099 households in the county, of which 33.4% had children under the age of 18 living in them, 46.5% were married-couple households, 19.0% had a male householder with no spouse or partner present, and 25.6% had a female householder with no spouse or partner present; about 28.3% of all households were made up of individuals and 13.6% had someone living alone who was 65 years of age or older.

There were 5,676 housing units, of which 10.2% were vacant; among occupied units, 72.0% were owner-occupied and 28.0% were renter-occupied, with a homeowner vacancy rate of 1.7% and a rental vacancy rate of 11.2%.

The racial makeup of the county was 73.1% White, 5.6% Black or African American, 1.0% American Indian and Alaska Native, 0.9% Asian, 0.3% Native Hawaiian and Pacific Islander, 12.2% from some other race, and 7.0% from two or more races, with Hispanic or Latino residents of any race comprising 21.4% of the population.

=== Racial and ethnic composition ===
Cass County, Illinois – Racial and ethnic composition Note: the US Census treats Hispanic/Latino as an ethnic category. This table excludes Latinos from the racial categories and assigns them to a separate category. Hispanics/Latinos may be of any race.
Race / Ethnicity (NH = Non-Hispanic)	Pop 1980	Pop 1990	Pop 2000	Pop 2010	Pop 2020	% 1980	% 1990	% 2000	% 2010	% 2020
White alone (NH)	14,960	13,334	12,346	10,830	9,061	99.18%	99.23%	90.15%	79.39%	69.48%
Black or African American alone (NH)	12	16	39	379	706	0.08%	0.12%	0.28%	2.78%	5.41%
Native American or Alaska Native alone (NH)	15	8	23	15	36	0.10%	0.06%	0.17%	0.11%	0.28%
Asian alone (NH)	18	23	38	43	117	0.12%	0.17%	0.28%	0.32%	0.90%
Native Hawaiian or Pacific Islander alone (NH)	x	x	3	1	33	x	x	0.02%	0.01%	0.25%
Other race alone (NH)	1	0	7	5	10	0.01%	0.00%	0.05%	0.04%	0.08%
Mixed race or Multiracial (NH)	x	x	77	78	290	x	x	0.56%	0.57%	2.22%
Hispanic or Latino (any race)	78	56	1,162	2,291	2,789	0.52%	0.42%	8.48%	16.79%	21.38%
Total	15,084	13,437	13,695	13,642	13,042	100.00%	100.00%	100.00%	100.00%	100.00%

=== 2010 census ===
As of the 2010 United States census, there were 13,642 people, 5,270 households, and 3,561 families residing in the county. The population density was 36.3 inhabitants per square mile (14.0/km^{2}). There were 5,836 housing units at an average density of 15.5 per square mile (6.0/km^{2}). The racial makeup of the county was 86.3% white, 3.1% black or African American, 0.3% Asian, 0.3% American Indian, 8.7% from other races, and 1.4% from two or more races. Those of Hispanic or Latino origin made up 16.8% of the population. In terms of ancestry, 22.6% were German, 21.0% were American, 10.6% were Irish, and 9.5% were English.

Of the 5,270 households, 33.9% had children under the age of 18 living with them, 51.1% were married couples living together, 10.9% had a female householder with no husband present, 32.4% were non-families, and 26.5% of all households were made up of individuals. The average household size was 2.55 and the average family size was 3.06. The median age was 38.7 years.

The median income for a household in the county was $41,544 and the median income for a family was $51,624. Males had a median income of $37,267 versus $26,634 for females. The per capita income for the county was $19,825. About 10.1% of families and 12.9% of the population were below the poverty line, including 14.2% of those under age 18 and 9.2% of those age 65 or over.

== Politics ==
Typically for German-settled western Central Illinois, Cass County opposed the Civil War and became solidly Democratic for the next six decades. Only hatred of Woodrow Wilson’s policies towards Germany following World War I drove the county into Republican hands in the 1920 landslide. Between 1924 and 2008, the county was something of a bellwether, missing the national winner only in the very close 1960 election and the heavily drought- and farm crisis-influenced election of 1988. In the 2010s, the county has become reliably Republican in US presidential elections. Cass County is located in Illinois's 18th Congressional District and is currently represented by Republican Darin LaHood. For the Illinois House of Representatives, the county is located in the 93rd district and is currently represented by Republican Norine Hammond. The county is located in the 47th district of the Illinois Senate, and is currently represented by Republican Jil Tracy.

United States presidential election results for Cass County, Illinois
Year	Republican		Democratic		Third party(ies)	
Year	No.	%	No.	%	No.	%
1892	1,533	38.95%	2,203	55.97%	200	5.08%
1896	1,946	43.59%	2,470	55.33%	48	1.08%
1900	1,846	40.72%	2,626	57.93%	61	1.35%
1904	1,827	46.80%	1,906	48.82%	171	4.38%
1908	1,878	42.46%	2,434	55.03%	111	2.51%
1912	719	17.14%	2,223	52.99%	1,253	29.87%
1916	3,193	39.51%	4,485	55.49%	404	5.00%
1920	3,956	54.06%	2,861	39.10%	501	6.85%
1924	3,139	41.23%	2,909	38.21%	1,565	20.56%
1928	4,009	53.50%	3,461	46.18%	24	0.32%
1932	2,745	32.27%	5,669	66.64%	93	1.09%
1936	3,209	35.30%	5,786	63.65%	95	1.05%
1940	4,490	47.68%	4,854	51.55%	72	0.76%
1944	3,641	48.00%	3,909	51.54%	35	0.46%
1948	3,391	46.99%	3,776	52.32%	50	0.69%
1952	4,152	54.88%	3,405	45.01%	8	0.11%
1956	4,125	54.97%	3,368	44.88%	11	0.15%
1960	4,015	52.04%	3,692	47.85%	8	0.10%
1964	2,836	39.06%	4,424	60.94%	0	0.00%
1968	3,411	47.78%	3,302	46.25%	426	5.97%
1972	4,414	61.14%	2,803	38.83%	2	0.03%
1976	3,524	49.33%	3,589	50.24%	31	0.43%
1980	3,965	58.57%	2,543	37.56%	262	3.87%
1984	3,435	53.68%	2,937	45.90%	27	0.42%
1988	2,916	46.53%	3,316	52.91%	35	0.56%
1992	2,162	33.53%	3,200	49.64%	1,085	16.83%
1996	2,214	39.07%	2,834	50.01%	619	10.92%
2000	2,968	50.31%	2,789	47.28%	142	2.41%
2004	3,163	55.49%	2,492	43.72%	45	0.79%
2008	2,617	48.18%	2,690	49.52%	125	2.30%
2012	2,707	55.49%	2,053	42.09%	118	2.42%
2016	3,216	62.76%	1,621	31.64%	287	5.60%
2020	3,625	68.06%	1,615	30.32%	86	1.61%
2024	3,712	70.83%	1,438	27.44%	91	1.74%

== Education ==
- A-C Central Community Unit School District 262
- Beardstown Community Unit School District 15
- Virginia Community Unit School District 64

== Communities ==
Community	Community type	Population	Total Area	Water Area	Land Area	Pop. Density
Arenzville	village	367	0.77	0.00	0.77	480
Ashland	village	1,218	0.75	0.00	0.75	1,624
Beardstown	city	5,951	3.65	0.03	3.62	1,620.41
Virginia (seat)	city	1,514	1.27	0.06	1.21	1,254.35
Chandlerville	village	527	0.79	0.00	0.79	670
Cass County	county	13,042	384	7.9	376	34

=== Unincorporated communities ===
- Bluff Springs
- Clear Lake
- Hagener
- Jules
- Little Indian
- Newmansville
- Old Princeton
- Palmerton
- Philadelphia

=== Former communities ===
- Gurney
- Oak Grove (now part of Beardstown; not to be confused with community in Rock Island County)
- Sylvan

=== Townships ===
- Arenzville
- Ashland
- Beardstown
- Bluff Springs
- Chandlerville
- Hagener
- Newmansville
- Panther Creek
- Philadelphia
- Sangamon Valley
- Virginia

== See also ==
- National Register of Historic Places listings in Cass County, Illinois
