= Bluff Springs, Illinois =

- Unincorporated community
- Location within Illinois Location within the United States
- Coordinates: 39°59′16″N 90°20′45″W
- Country: United States
- State: Illinois
- County: Cass
- Elevation: 492 ft (150 m)
- Time zone: UTC-6 (Central (CST))
  - Summer (DST): UTC-5 (CDT)
- ZIP code: 62622
- Area code: 217
- GNIS feature ID: 404623

Bluff Springs is an unincorporated community in Cass County, Illinois, United States. Bluff Springs is located on Illinois Route 125, east of Beardstown.
