= A-C Central Community Unit School District 262 =

School district in Cass County, Illinois, United States

Location
- Ashland and Chandlerville, Illinois 46 United States

District information
- Type: Unit school district
- Grades: K–12
- Established: 1989
- Superintendent: Tim Page
- Budget: $4.3M

Students and staff
- Students: 435
- Teachers: 40
- Staff: 32

Other information
- Website: www.a-ccentral.com

A-C Central Community Unit School District 262 brings together students from Ashland and Chandlerville, Illinois, United States. A small, rural district, A-C Central has an elementary school (K–4) in Chandlerville, a junior high school (5–8) in Ashland, and a high school (9–12) at the same facility as the junior high school in Ashland.

The territory covers 150 square miles (390 km^{2}) in Cass County, Morgan County, Sangamon County, and Menard County. As of 2012, there were approximately 435 students: 196 at A-C Central Elementary, 93 at A-C Central Junior High School, and 139 at A-C Central High School. Also in 2012, the district had 40 certified teachers, 6 bus routes, and 1 special education bus route.

== History ==
Ashland – Chandlerville Community Unit School District No. 262 was formed by the consolidation of Chandlerville Community Unit School District 62 and Ashland Community Unit School District 212 in 1989. The consolidation was passed by public referendum. On 25 March 1997, the school board changed the district name to A-C Central Community Unit School District No. 262, renamed the Chandlerville school to A-C Central Junior High, and renamed the Ashland school to A-C Central Elementary School.

As of 2005, the school district has approximately 203 elementary students, 143 junior high students and 150 high school students.

The future for A-C Central is a bit unclear. Like nearly all of the small districts surrounding it, A-C Central faces budget issues. In 2005, a referendum was put before the voters of A-C Central and adjacent Virginia Community Unit School District 64 to consolidate the two districts. The referendum failed, leaving the Virginia school district in a desperate financial situation. Consolidation is back on the BoE agenda for their regular board meeting 16 December 2009 though.

A-C Central consolidation with PORTA Community Unit School District 202 failed in the 18 March 2014 election. The referendum passed by 1,755 to 548 in the PORTA district, but was voted down in the A-C district, by 424 to 515 in Cass County and 46 to 88 in Morgan County.
