= Ashland, Illinois =

Village in Cass County, Illinois, United States

Ashland
- Village
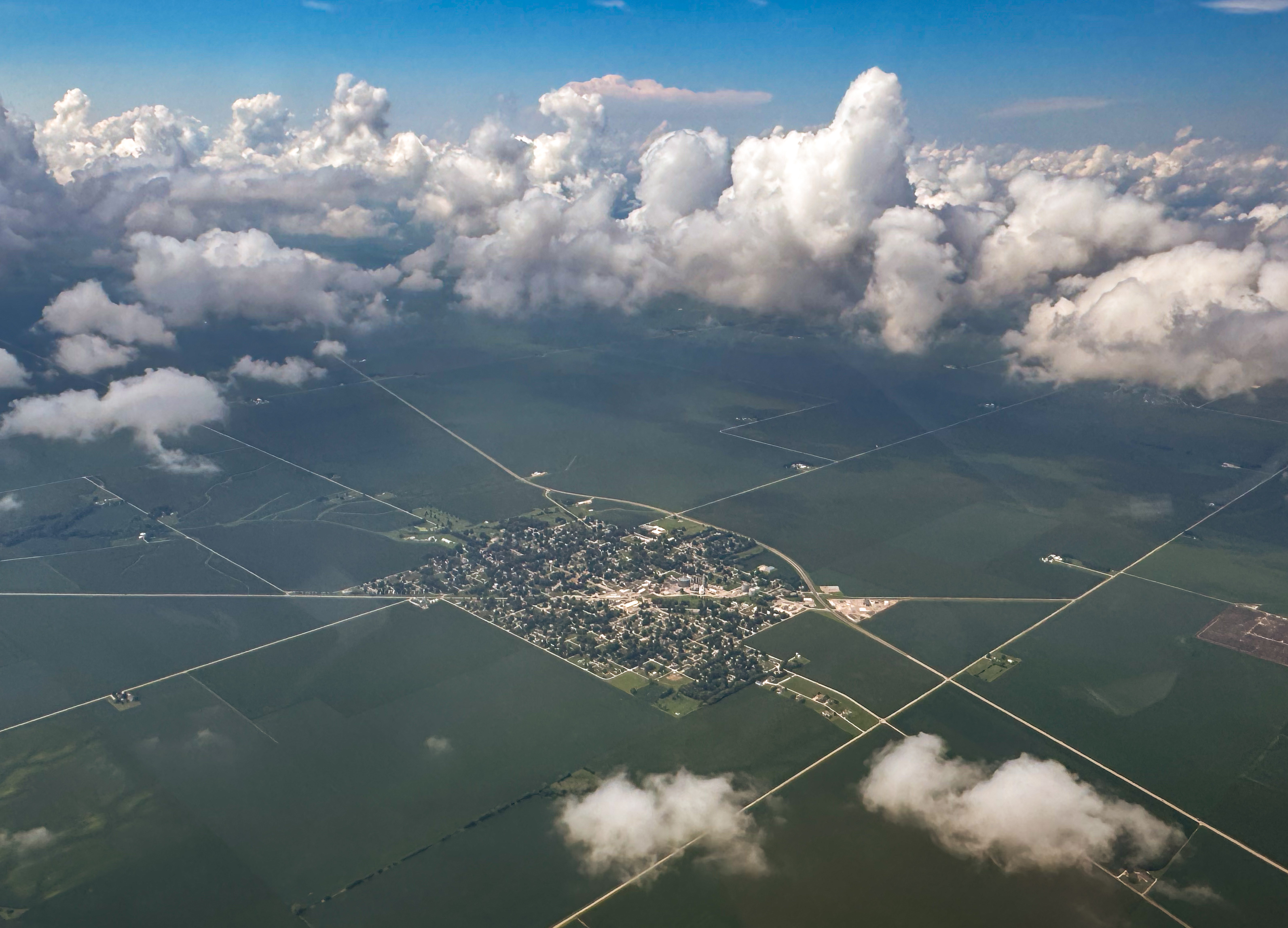
- Aerial view of Ashland, Illinois
- Nickname: The Heart of Lincolnland
- Location of Ashland in Cass County, Illinois.

- Location in Illinois Ashland (the United States) Ashland (North America)
- Coordinates: 39°53′15″N 90°0′16″W
- Country: United States
- State: Illinois
- County: Cass

Area
  - Total: 0.75 sq mi (1.94 km^{2})
  - Land: 0.75 sq mi (1.94 km^{2})
  - Water: 0 sq mi (0.00 km^{2})
- Elevation: 633 ft (193 m)

Population (2020)
  - Total: 1,218
  - Density: 1,624/sq mi (627/km^{2})
- Time zone: UTC-6 (CST)
  - Summer (DST): UTC-5 (CDT)
- ZIP code: 62612
- Area code: 217
- FIPS code: 17-02505
- GNIS feature ID: 2397996
- Website: https://www.ashlandil.com/

Ashland is a village in Cass County, Illinois, United States. The population was 1,218 at the 2020 census.

== Geography ==
According to the 2021 census gazetteer files, Ashland has a total area of 0.75 square miles (1.94 km^{2}), all land.

== Demographics ==
Historical population
Census	Pop.	Note	%±
1870	203		—
1880	609		200.0%
1890	1,045		71.6%
1900	1,201		14.9%
1910	1,096		−8.7%
1920	1,122		2.4%
1930	1,007		−10.2%
1940	1,139		13.1%
1950	1,039		−8.8%
1960	1,064		2.4%
1970	1,128		6.0%
1980	1,351		19.8%
1990	1,257		−7.0%
2000	1,361		8.3%
2010	1,333		−2.1%
2020	1,218		−8.6%
U.S. Decennial Census

=== 2020 census ===
As of the 2020 census, there were 1,218 people, 519 households, and 381 families residing in the village. The population density was 1,628.34 inhabitants per square mile (628.71/km^{2}). There were 571 housing units at an average density of 763.37 per square mile (294.74/km^{2}).

The median age was 41.7 years. 22.5% of residents were under the age of 18 and 19.5% of residents were 65 years of age or older. For every 100 females there were 89.4 males, and for every 100 females age 18 and over there were 86.6 males age 18 and over.

0.0% of residents lived in urban areas, while 100.0% lived in rural areas.

There were 519 households in Ashland, of which 27.4% had children under the age of 18 living in them. Of all households, 47.6% were married-couple households, 16.4% were households with a male householder and no spouse or partner present, and 29.5% were households with a female householder and no spouse or partner present. About 33.1% of all households were made up of individuals and 17.5% had someone living alone who was 65 years of age or older. The average household size was 2.76 and the average family size was 2.36.

There were 571 housing units, of which 9.1% were vacant. The homeowner vacancy rate was 1.5% and the rental vacancy rate was 18.2%.

Racial composition as of the 2020 census
Race	Number	Percent
White	1,154	94.7%
Black or African American	9	0.7%
American Indian and Alaska Native	6	0.5%
Asian	3	0.2%
Native Hawaiian and Other Pacific Islander	0	0.0%
Some other race	2	0.2%
Two or more races	44	3.6%
Hispanic or Latino (of any race)	3	0.2%

=== Income and poverty ===
The median income for a household in the village was $60,104, and the median income for a family was $67,917. Males had a median income of $46,310 versus $36,467 for females. The per capita income for the village was $33,764. About 3.7% of families and 5.3% of the population were below the poverty line, including 3.6% of those under age 18 and 5.7% of those age 65 or over.

== See also ==
- List of municipalities in Illinois
