= Beardstown Community Unit School District 15 =

School district in Cass County, Illinois, United States

Address
- 500 East 15th Street Beardstown, Illinois, 62618; United States

District information
- Type: Public
- Grades: PreK–12
- NCES District ID: 1705310

Students and staff
- Students: 1,415 (2020–2021)

Other information
- Website: www.beardstown.com

Beardstown Community Unit School District 15 is a unit school district located in the Cass County, Illinois city of its namesake: Beardstown. The majority of students in the district are white, but the district also has a 35% Hispanic population and has many bilingual students.

There are three schools located within this district. Grand Avenue School serves the district's preschoolers; Gard Elementary School grades kindergarten through fourth; lastly, Beardstown Middle/High School, also known as Beardstown Junior Beardstown Junior/Senior High School, serves grades 6–12. The superintendent is Reggie Clinton. As of 2013, the principals of each of the respective schools are Pam DeSollar of Grand Avenue School, Steve Groll of Gard/Brick Elementary Schools, and Scott Riddle of Beardstown Middle/High School. The mascot for all schools in the district is the tiger.

Brick School, built in 1927 and expanded in 1950 and 1990, closed at the end of the 2013–2014 school year; the school board voted on September 20, 2014, to sell the Brick School property.
