= Virginia, Illinois =

- City
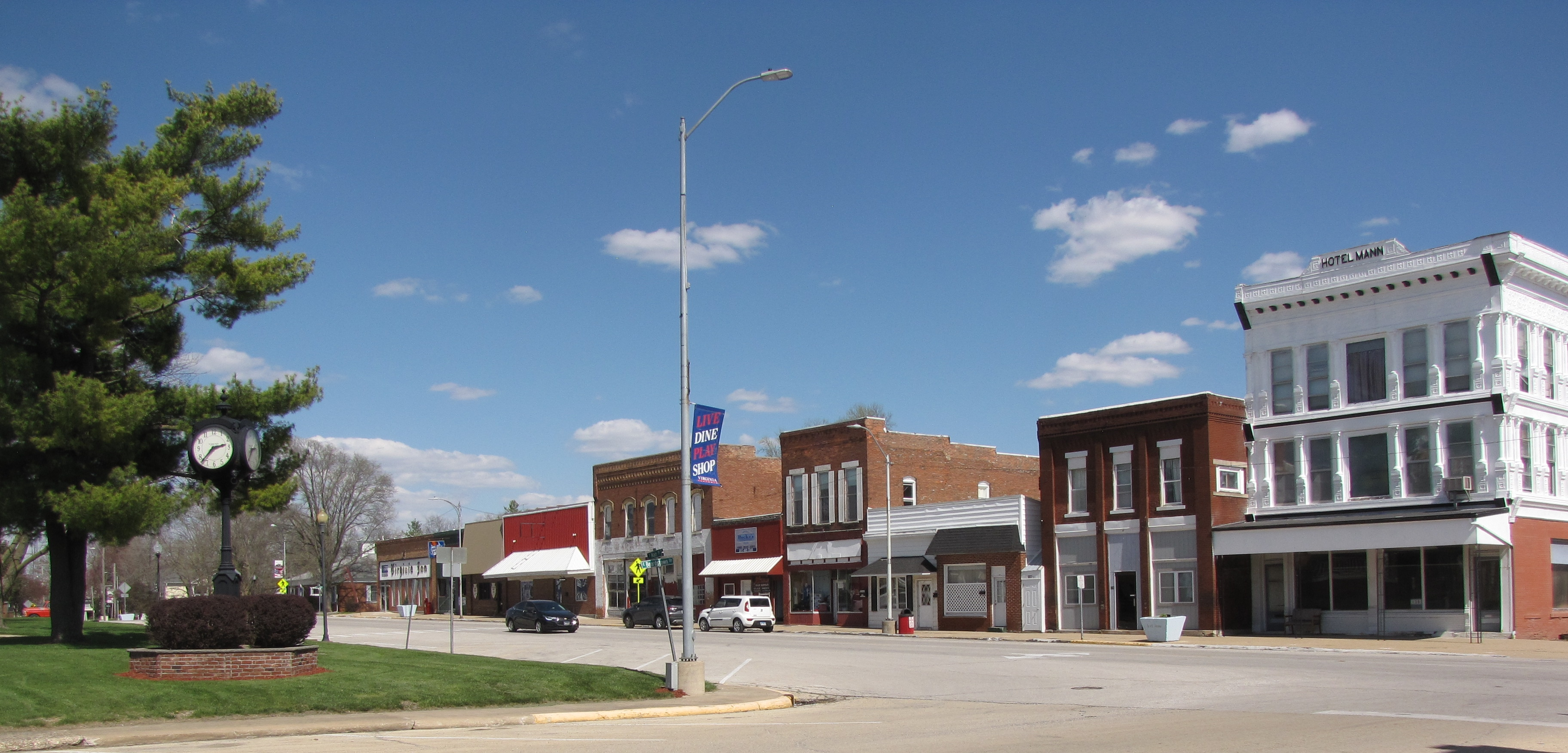
- Main Street
- Nickname: Illinois' Gem on the Prairie
- Interactive map of Virginia, Illinois
- Location within Illinois Location within the United States
- Coordinates: 39°57′09″N 90°12′39″W
- Country: United States
- State: Illinois
- County: Cass
- Township: Virginia
- Founded: 1836

Area
  - Total: 1.27 sq mi (3.29 km^{2})
  - Land: 1.20 sq mi (3.12 km^{2})
  - Water: 0.066 sq mi (0.17 km^{2})
- Elevation: 617 ft (188 m)

Population (2020)
  - Total: 1,514
  - Density: 1,255/sq mi (484.5/km^{2})
- Time zone: UTC-6 (CST)
  - Summer (DST): UTC-5 (CDT)
- ZIP code: 62691
- Area code: 217 452
- FIPS code: 17-78201
- GNIS feature ID: 2397152
- Website: virginiaillinois.net

Virginia is a city and the county seat in Cass County, Illinois, United States. The population was 1,514 at the 2020 census.

== Geography ==
According to the 2021 census gazetteer files, Virginia has a total area of 1.27 square miles (3.29 km^{2}), of which 1.21 square miles (3.13 km^{2}) (or 94.96%) is land and 0.06 square miles (0.16 km^{2}) (or 5.04%) is water.

== Demographics ==
Historical population
Census	Pop.	Note	%±
1870	954		—
1880	1,420		48.8%
1890	1,602		12.8%
1900	1,600		−0.1%
1910	1,501		−6.2%
1920	1,501		0.0%
1930	1,494		−0.5%
1940	1,418		−5.1%
1950	1,572		10.9%
1960	1,669		6.2%
1970	1,814		8.7%
1980	1,825		0.6%
1990	1,767		−3.2%
2000	1,728		−2.2%
2010	1,611		−6.8%
2020	1,514		−6.0%
U.S. Decennial Census

=== 2020 census ===
As of the 2020 census, Virginia had a population of 1,514. The population density was 1,191.19 inhabitants per square mile (459.92/km^{2}). There were 728 housing units at an average density of 572.78 per square mile (221.15/km^{2}).

The median age was 44.1 years. 22.2% of residents were under the age of 18 and 21.2% of residents were 65 years of age or older. For every 100 females there were 92.6 males, and for every 100 females age 18 and over there were 90.0 males age 18 and over.

0.0% of residents lived in urban areas, while 100.0% lived in rural areas.

There were 653 households in Virginia, of which 27.1% had children under the age of 18 living in them. Of all households, 40.1% were married-couple households, 20.1% were households with a male householder and no spouse or partner present, and 29.9% were households with a female householder and no spouse or partner present. About 33.1% of all households were made up of individuals and 17.1% had someone living alone who was 65 years of age or older.

There were 728 housing units, of which 10.3% were vacant. The homeowner vacancy rate was 0.8% and the rental vacancy rate was 7.9%.

Racial composition as of the 2020 census
Race	Number	Percent
White	1,392	91.9%
Black or African American	11	0.7%
American Indian and Alaska Native	8	0.5%
Asian	4	0.3%
Native Hawaiian and Other Pacific Islander	2	0.1%
Some other race	21	1.4%
Two or more races	76	5.0%
Hispanic or Latino (of any race)	67	4.4%

=== Income and poverty ===
The median income for a household in the city was $48,625, and the median income for a family was $52,125. Males had a median income of $36,250 versus $31,793 for females. The per capita income for the city was $26,824. About 19.8% of families and 18.4% of the population were below the poverty line, including 29.8% of those under age 18 and 4.7% of those age 65 or over.

== Education ==
Virginia has one school: a K-12 facility run by Virginia Community Unit School District 64. The facility is broken down into sections: Virginia Elementary School, Virginia Junior High School, and Virginia High School.

== Notable people ==
- Craig J. Findley (born 1948), newspaper editor, photographer, and Illinois state representative
- Eric Jokisch (born 1989) - MLB pitcher (Chicago Cubs 2014), KBO pitcher (Kiwoom Heroes 2019–2023)
- John Linebaugh Knuppel (1923–1986), Illinois state senator
- Arthur A. Leeper (1855–1931), Illinois state senator
- Kyle MacWherter (1892–1977), American football player
- Howard D. McKibben (born 1940), judge of the United States District Court for the District of Nevada

== See also ==
- Jim Edgar Panther Creek State Fish and Wildlife Area — nearby state conservation area
