= Illinois Route 125 =

State highway in central Illinois, US

Illinois Route 125
- IL 125 highlighted in red

Route information
- Maintained by IDOT
- Length: 37.10 mi (59.71 km)
- Existed: 1924–present

Major junctions
- West end: US 67 / IL 100 in Beardstown
- East end: IL 97 in Pleasant Plains

Location
- Country: United States
- State: Illinois
- Counties: Cass, Sangamon

Highway system
- Illinois State Highway System; Interstate; US; State; Tollways; Scenic
← IL 124	→ IL 126

Illinois Route 125 (IL-125) is a major 37.10 miles (59.71 km) highway in the central portion of the U.S. state of Illinois. Illinois 125 runs east from the concurrent U.S. Route 67 and Illinois Route 100 near Beardstown to Illinois Route 97 in Farmingdale, west of Springfield.

== Route description ==
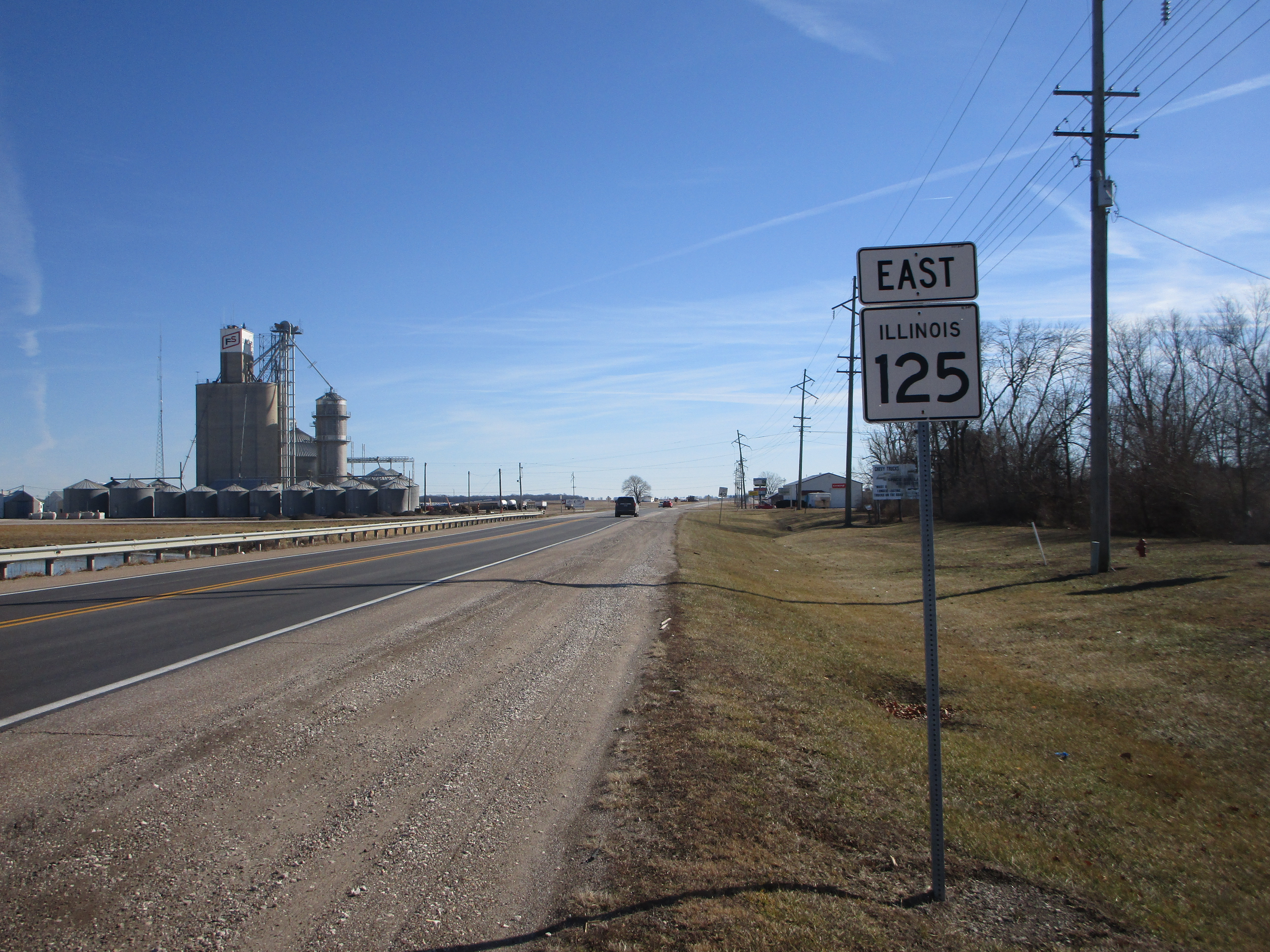
IL 125

Illinois 125 lies within Cass County and Sangamon County, and serves the towns of Ashland and Virginia. Virginia is the county seat of Cass County.

IL-125 follows most of the route of the Sangamon Trail, a pioneer trail from Springfield, the state capital, to the Illinois River. Points of interest directly located on IL-125 include the Clayville Tavern, an 1824 hostelry located 2 miles (3.2 km) east of Pleasant Plains, and the Illinois River bluff at Bluff Springs, five miles (8 km) east of Beardstown and the river.

Points of interest marked on IL-125, but not directly on the road, include the Jim Edgar Panther Creek State Fish and Wildlife Area in eastern Cass County northwest of Ashland, and the old Cass County courthouse in Beardstown where lawyer Abraham Lincoln practiced.

== History ==
SBI Route 125 originally ran from Springfield to Virginia. In 1968 it was extended west to Beardstown, replacing U.S. 67 and parts of Illinois Route 3. The next year it was truncated on its eastern portion from Springfield to Illinois 97. There have been no changes to Illinois 125 since 1969.

== Major intersections ==
County	Location	mi	km	Destinations	Notes
Cass	Beardstown	0.00	0.00	US 67 / IL 100 (Grand Avenue) – Meredosia, Rushville	Western terminus of IL 125
Cass	Virginia	13.0	20.9	IL 78 (North Main Street) – Jacksonville, Chandlerville	
Sangamon	Pleasant Plains	28.1	45.2	IL 123 – Tallula	Western terminus of IL 123
Sangamon	Gardner Township	37.10	59.71	IL 97 – Petersburg, Springfield	Eastern terminus of IL 125
1.000 mi = 1.609 km; 1.000 km = 0.621 mi
