= Chandlerville, Illinois =

Chandlerville
- Village
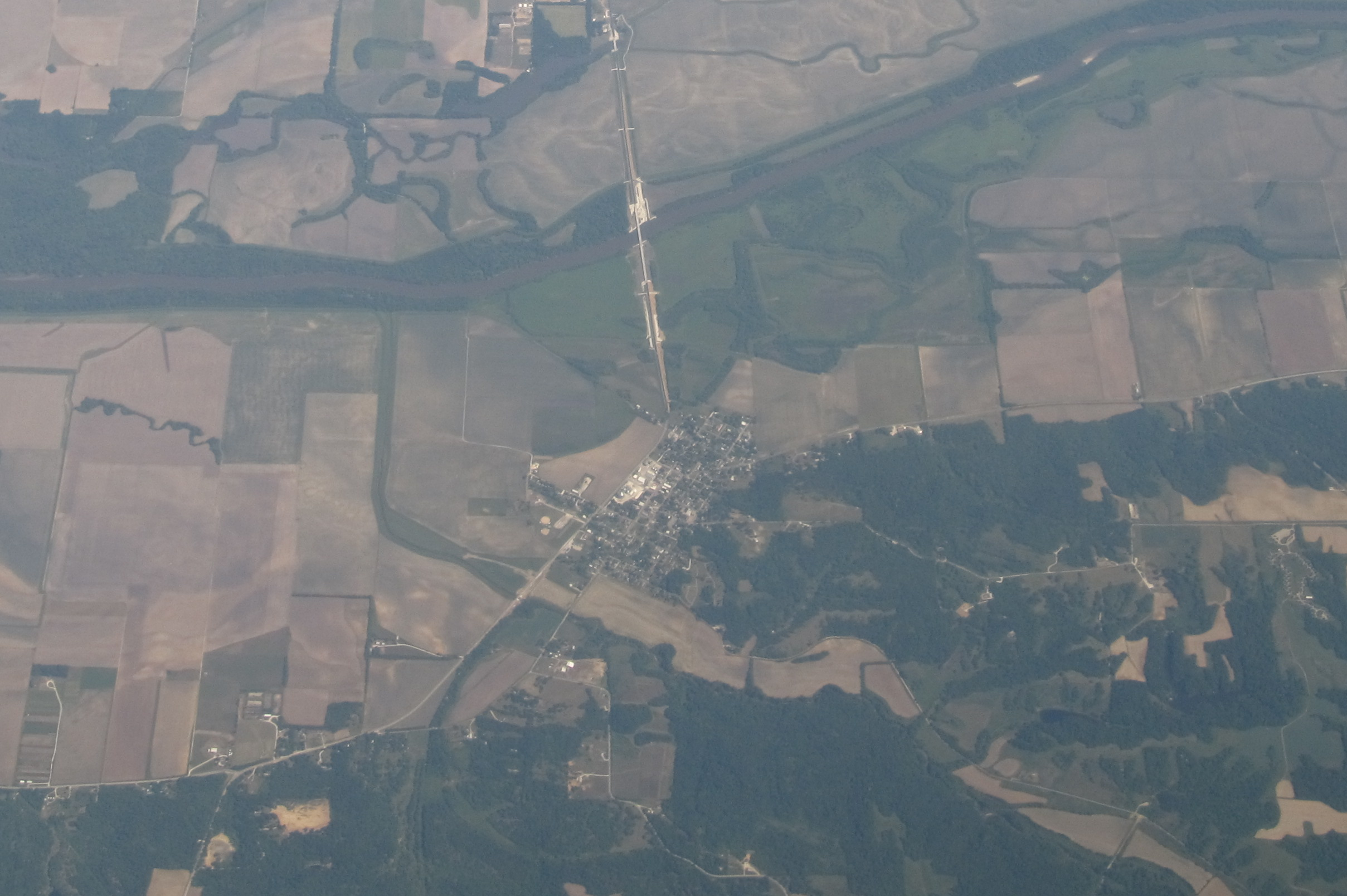
- Aerial view of Chandlerville

- Location of Chandlerville in Cass County, Illinois.
- Coordinates: 40°02′49″N 90°09′05″W
- Country: United States
- State: Illinois
- County: Cass

Government
  - Village president: Tim Richard

Area
  - Total: 0.80 sq mi (2.06 km^{2})
  - Land: 0.80 sq mi (2.06 km^{2})
  - Water: 0 sq mi (0.00 km^{2})
- Elevation: 479 ft (146 m)

Population (2020)
  - Total: 527
  - Density: 663/sq mi (256/km^{2})
- Time zone: UTC-6 (CST)
  - Summer (DST): UTC-5 (CDT)
- ZIP Code(s): 62627
- Area code(s): 217, 447
- FIPS code: 17-12450
- GNIS feature ID: 2397600

Chandlerville is a village in Cass County, Illinois, United States. The population was 527 at the 2020 census.

== History ==
Chandlerville was named for its founder, Dr. Charles Chandler.

== Geography ==
According to the 2021 census gazetteer files, Chandlerville has a total area of 0.79 square miles (2.05 km^{2}), all land.

== Demographics ==
Historical population
Census	Pop.	Note	%±
1870	401		—
1880	681		69.8%
1890	910		33.6%
1900	940		3.3%
1910	884		−6.0%
1920	909		2.8%
1930	824		−9.4%
1940	874		6.1%
1950	788		−9.8%
1960	718		−8.9%
1970	762		6.1%
1980	842		10.5%
1990	689		−18.2%
2000	704		2.2%
2010	553		−21.4%
2020	527		−4.7%
U.S. Decennial Census

As of the 2020 census there were 527 people, 217 households, and 103 families residing in the village. The population density was 663.73 inhabitants per square mile (256.27/km^{2}). There were 260 housing units at an average density of 327.46 per square mile (126.43/km^{2}). The racial makeup of the village was 96.39% White, 0.57% African American, 0.19% Native American, 0.95% Asian, 1.14% from other races, and 0.76% from two or more races. Hispanic or Latino of any race were 1.33% of the population.

There were 217 households, out of which 17.5% had children under the age of 18 living with them, 36.87% were married couples living together, 7.83% had a female householder with no husband present, and 52.53% were non-families. 50.69% of all households were made up of individuals, and 29.95% had someone living alone who was 65 years of age or older. The average household size was 2.88 and the average family size was 1.98.

The village's age distribution consisted of 22.8% under the age of 18, 6.5% from 18 to 24, 16.9% from 25 to 44, 27.4% from 45 to 64, and 26.5% who were 65 years of age or older. The median age was 46.4 years. For every 100 females, there were 129.9 males. For every 100 females age 18 and over, there were 129.0 males.

The median income for a household in the village was $38,750, and the median income for a family was $66,875. Males had a median income of $52,188 versus $23,250 for females. The per capita income for the village was $33,350. About 9.7% of families and 20.0% of the population were below the poverty line, including 46.9% of those under age 18 and 2.6% of those age 65 or over.

== Notable people ==
Scott Lucas, United States senator from Illinois, was born in Chandlerville
