= Virginia Community Unit School District 64 =

School district in Cass County, Illinois, United States

Address
- 651 South Morgan Street Virginia, Illinois, 62691; United States

District information
- Type: Public
- Grades: PreK–12
- NCES District ID: 1740410

Students and staff
- Students: 315 (2020–2021)

Other information
- Website: www.virginia64.com

Virginia Community Unit School District 64 is a unified school district located in the city of Virginia, the county seat of western Illinois' Cass County. It reports to the state as two schools: Virginia Elementary School for pre-kindergarten through fifth grade, and Virginia Junior/Senior High School for sixth grade through twelfth grade.

As of 2018 the superintendent was Gary DePatis, the junior-senior high school principal was Aaron Llewellyn, and the elementary school principal was Kara Bowman.

The mascot of the district's high school is the redbird. Among the extracurricular activities are Future Farmers of America and Scholastic Bowl. Sports include baseball and softball; basketball; cross country; football; and volleyball.
