= List of United States tornadoes from July to September 2021 =

List of tornadoes in the United States

United States tornadoes from July to September 2021
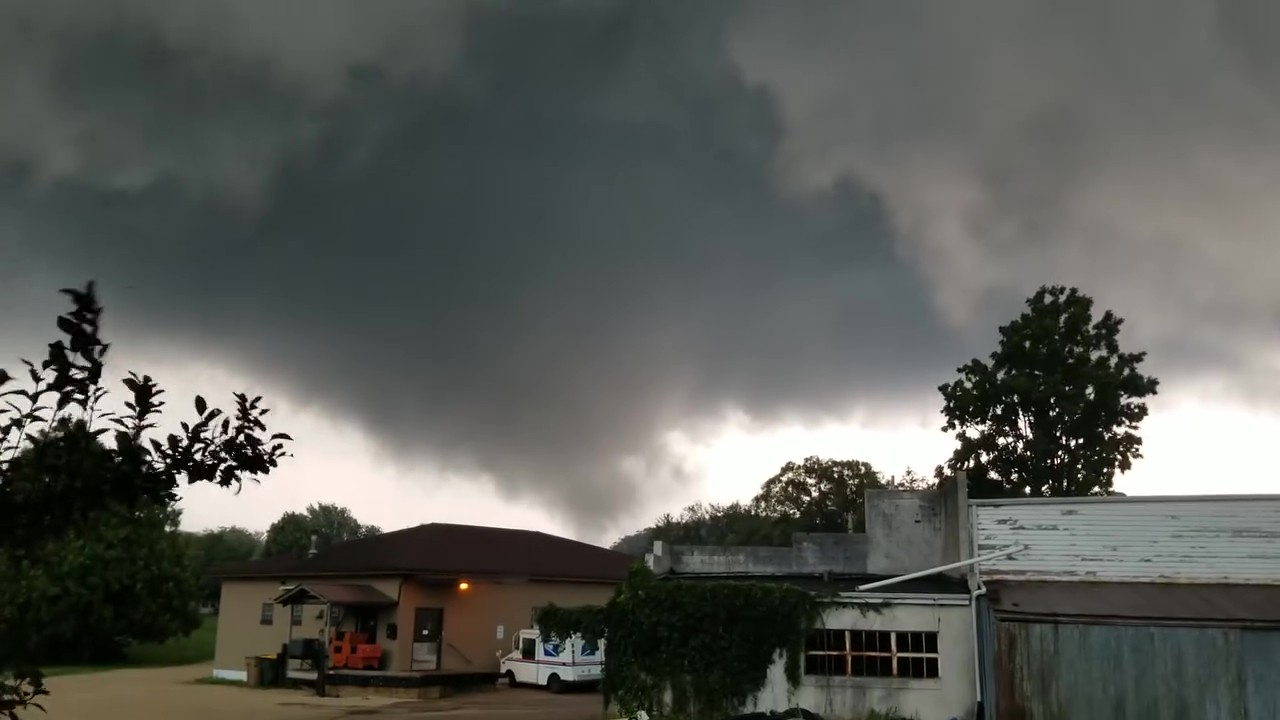
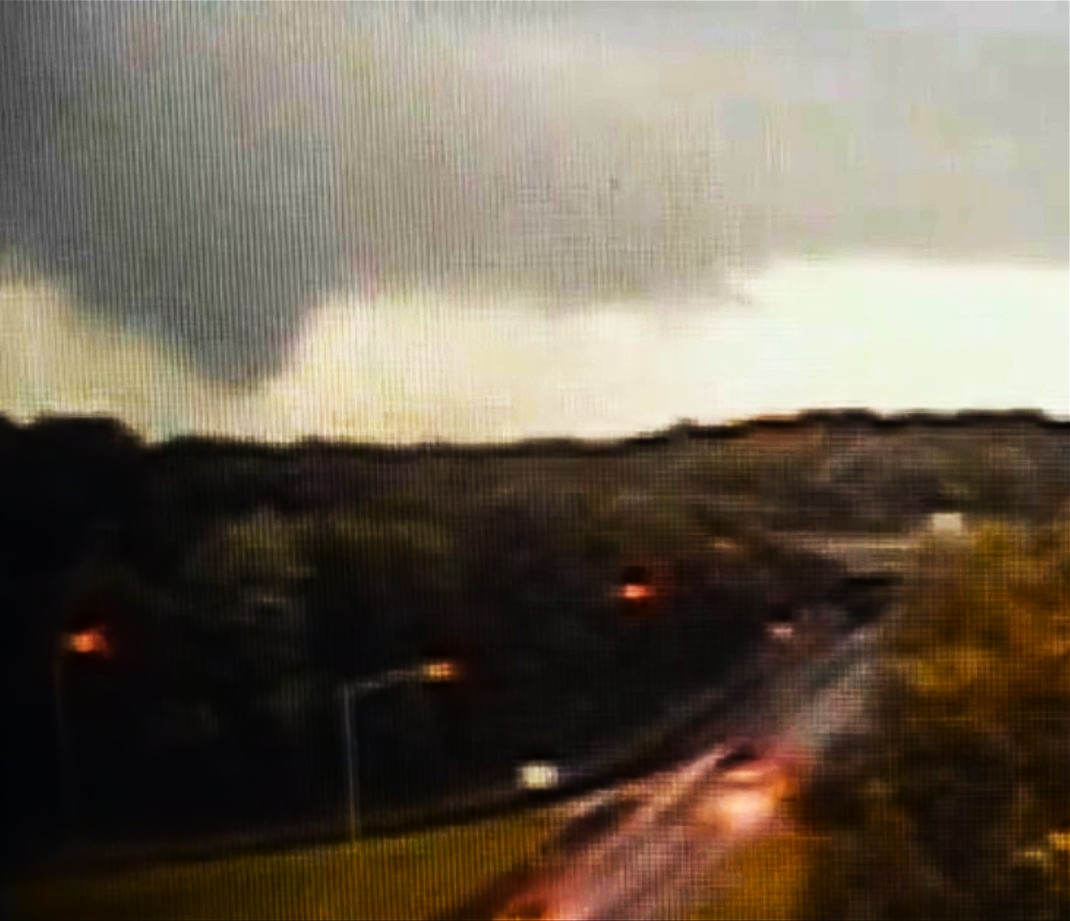
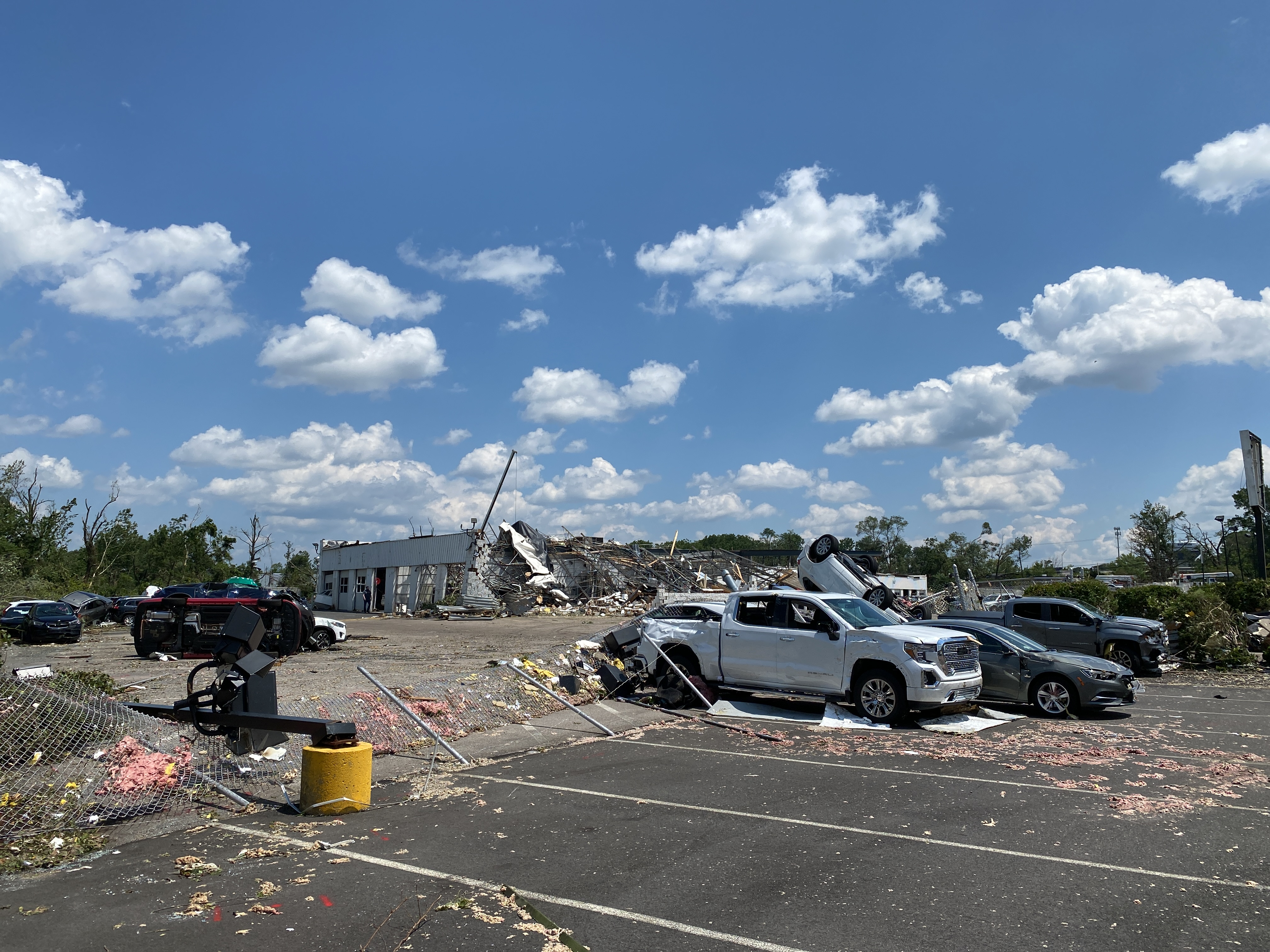
- Clockwise from top: An EF3 tornado shortly after formation near Boscobel, Wisconsin on August 7; An auto dealership after an EF3 tornado passed over Trevose, Pennsylvania on July 29; An intense EF3 tornado near Mullica Hill, New Jersey.
- Timespan: July 1 – September 27
- Maximum rated tornado: EF3 tornado: Lake City, Iowa on July 14; Bensalem, Pennsylvania on July 29; Boscobel, Wisconsin on August 7; Cedar Grove–Mullica Hill, New Jersey on September 1
- Tornadoes: 307
- Fatalities: 1
- Injuries: 41

This page documents all tornadoes confirmed by various weather forecast offices of the National Weather Service in the United States from July to September 2021. On average, there are 134 confirmed tornadoes in the United States in July, 83 in August, and 74 in September.

All three months had varying levels of tornadoes that were produced from tropical cyclones. July was near average with 128 tornadoes, with several tornadoes produced by Hurricane Elsa as well as a destructive outbreak at the end of the month. August had 150 tornadoes, the first month to be above average since March. Most of the tornado activity came from the tropics, including moderate to severe outbreaks produced by Tropical Storm Fred and Hurricane Ida, the latter of which continued into September. The rest of September, however, saw only isolated tornado activity and was significantly below average with only 28 tornadoes.

== United States yearly total ==
Confirmed tornadoes by Enhanced Fujita rating
EFU	EF0	EF1	EF2	EF3	EF4	EF5	Total
210	545	433	103	21	3	0	1,315

== July ==
Confirmed tornadoes by Enhanced Fujita rating
EFU	EF0	EF1	EF2	EF3	EF4	EF5	Total
23	44	53	6	2	0	0	128

=== July 1 event ===
List of confirmed tornadoes – Thursday, July 1, 2021 (Note: All dates are based on the local time zone where the tornado touched down; however, all times are in Coordinated Universal Time for consistency.)
EF#	Location	County / Parish	State	Start Coord.	Time (UTC)	Path length	Max width
EF1	N of Farmington to SW of Houston	Kent	DE	38.8892°N 75.5826°W	20:52–20:55	3.85 mi (6.20 km)	50 yd (46 m)
EF1	Metal roofing was peeled from a business, trees were snapped and knocked down, and numerous tree limbs were downed. Two homes were damaged by falling trees and tree limbs. Corn was flattened in a convergent pattern.						
EF1	ENE of Milford to Slaughter Beach	Sussex	DE	38.9209°N 75.3898°W	21:00–21:07	4.7 mi (7.6 km)	100 yd (91 m)
EF1	Two pole barns lost most of their roofing, three trailers were overturned, part of a porch roof was uplifted, and a large TV antenna was bent. Trees were uprooted and snapped. Falling tree branches damaged vehicles and destroyed a shed.						
EF1	Waverley Hills to the National Mall	Arlington (VA), Washington, D.C.	VA, D.C.	38.8965°N 77.1174°W	00:59–01:05	4.33 mi (6.97 km)	125 yd (114 m)
EF1	The tornado first touched down in the Waverly Hills community in Arlington County and traveled eastward through the county's Cherrydale and Lyon Village neighborhoods. Several homes lost siding and numerous trees were snapped and uprooted, with some downing power lines. A large tree limb struck a home, injuring and briefly trapping one person. The tornado then crossed the Potomac River near the Theodore Roosevelt Bridge and continued eastward along the National Mall in Washington, D.C. The tornado dissipated near 16th Street NW and Constitution Avenue, south of The Ellipse and the White House. Winds uprooted trees and broke their trunks and branches on and near the Mall. Temporary fences erected for the Mall's upcoming July 4 Independence Day events were lifted, twisted and fell near the end of the tornado's path. Portable toilets brought in for the events also toppled over. Straight-line winds damaged trees near other landmarks, including the Lincoln Memorial and the DC War Memorial. Damage amounted to $600,000. A Major League Baseball game between the Washington Nationals and Los Angeles Dodgers was stopped due to the tornado nearby.						
EF0	Kingman Park	Washington, D.C.	D.C.	38.9014°N 76.9973°W	01:08–01:10	0.97 mi (1.56 km)	75 yd (69 m)
EF0	A brief tornado downed several hardwood trees and snapped numerous tree limbs. One large tree limb fell on two cars. Damage amounted to $100,000.						

=== July 2 event ===
List of confirmed tornadoes – Saturday, July 2, 2021
EF#	Location	County / Parish	State	Start Coord.	Time (UTC)	Path length	Max width
EFU	Catalina Foothills	Pima	AZ	32.3085°N 110.8445°W	21:57-22:03	0.59 mi (0.95 km)	10 yd (9.1 m)
EFU	A weak landspout was photographed moving through Northeast Tucson. No damage occurred.						

=== July 3 event ===
List of confirmed tornadoes – Saturday, July 3, 2021
EF#	Location	County / Parish	State	Start Coord.	Time (UTC)	Path length	Max width
EF0	N of Otis	Washington	CO	40.37°N 102.94°W	22:19-22:20	0.01 mi (0.016 km)	25 yd (23 m)
EF0	A landspout briefly touched down in an open field.						
EF0	NW of Woodrow	Morgan	CO	40.06°N 103.69°W	22:41-22:45	0.01 mi (0.016 km)	25 yd (23 m)
EF0	A landspout briefly touched down in an open field.						
EFU	NE of Clinton	Sheridan	NE	42.79°N 102.31°W	23:16	0.1 mi (0.16 km)	10 yd (9.1 m)
EFU	A brief landspout touched down over open prairie. No damage was reported.						

=== July 6 event ===
List of confirmed tornadoes – Tuesday, July 6, 2021
EF#	Location	County / Parish	State	Start Coord.	Time (UTC)	Path length	Max width
EFU	S of Lamar	Prowers	CO	37.88°N 102.69°W	20:14-20:17	0.19 mi (0.31 km)	20 yd (18 m)
EFU	A landspout briefly touched down in an open field.						
EFU	S of Lamar	Prowers	CO	37.88°N 102.69°W	20:14-20:17	0.19 mi (0.31 km)	20 yd (18 m)
EFU	This landspout occurred simultaneously with the previous one.						
EFU	WNW of Hays	Blaine	MT	48.0380°N 108.84000°W	00:11–00:20	4.89 mi (7.87 km)	30 yd (27 m)
EFU	A brief tornado moved across open, inaccessible ranchland and was documented by pictures, video, and radar. No known damage occurred.						

=== July 7 event ===
Events were associated with Hurricane Elsa.

List of confirmed tornadoes – Wednesday, July 7, 2021
EF#	Location	County / Parish	State	Start Coord.	Time (UTC)	Path length	Max width
EF0	SW of Columbia	Columbia	FL	30.0568°N 82.7061°W	10:47–10:48	0.03 mi (0.048 km)	100 yd (91 m)
EF0	Trees were snapped. A back porch had its metal roof peeled back and adjoining plywood walls collapsed.						
EF1	NNE of Mandarin to S of Arlington	Duval	FL	30.2271°N 81.6066°W	20:45–20:51	3.71 mi (5.97 km)	150 yd (140 m)
EF1	This tornado caused considerable damage in neighborhoods south of downtown Jacksonville. Industrial buildings suffered heavy damage with metal siding ripped off, roofs peeled back, and debris thrown to the top of a radio tower. Many homes and some apartment buildings were damaged in residential areas, trees were uprooted, and tree limbs were snapped. One large pine tree was snapped and fell on the deck of an apartment building. There was tree damage at University Christian School as well.						
EF1	St. Marys to WNW of Dungeness	Camden	GA	30.7205°N 81.5469°W	21:43–21:49	7.61 mi (12.25 km)	200 yd (180 m)
EF1	In St. Marys, several homes and apartment buildings sustained considerable damage, a garage was destroyed, and trees were downed, some of which landed on structures. Father north, additional damage occurred at an RV park and Naval Submarine Base Kings Bay. Multiple RVs were flipped over, with two flipped completely upside down. One was blown about 200 yards (200 m) into a lake, as was a pickup truck. Solar panels were damaged, and several hardwood trees were snapped. 17 people were injured. The tornado was initially given a preliminary rating of EF2, but was downgraded to EF1 a few days later.						
EF1	E of Springfield	Effingham	GA	32.3721°N 81.2832°W	02:48–02:50	1.95 mi (3.14 km)	100 yd (91 m)
EF1	Multiple homes suffered minor roof and siding damage, two boats on trailers were overturned, two carports collapsed, and power lines were downed. Numerous trees were uprooted and snapped. One person was injured.						
EF1	SSE of Parris Island	Beaufort	SC	32.3208°N 80.6741°W	03:44–03:45	0.13 mi (0.21 km)	50 yd (46 m)
EF1	A very brief tornado snapped numerous softwood trees.						
EF1	Port Royal	Beaufort	SC	32.3763°N 80.6915°W	03:50–03:52	0.63 mi (1.01 km)	75 yd (69 m)
EF1	Numerous trees and tree limbs were snapped in town, some of which fell on homes and took down power lines.						

=== July 8 event ===
Event in the Southeastern United States was associated with Hurricane Elsa.

List of confirmed tornadoes – Thursday, July 8, 2021
EF#	Location	County / Parish	State	Start Coord.	Time (UTC)	Path length	Max width
EF1	Edisto Island	Charleston	SC	32.5627°N 80.2978°W	05:00–05:02	1.12 mi (1.80 km)	100 yd (91 m)
EF1	Trees were snapped and uprooted along the path.						
EF1	NE of Mount Pleasant Regional Airport	Charleston	SC	32.9149°N 79.7314°W	07:36–07:38	0.82 mi (1.32 km)	150 yd (140 m)
EF1	Trees and tree limbs were snapped, and a home had its front door blown in.						
EF0	S of New Zion	Clarendon	SC	33.8091°N 80.0212°W	08:12–8:14	1.5 mi (2.4 km)	40 yd (37 m)
EF0	The wall of a warehouse collapsed, an equipment shelter was destroyed, and a grain auger was knocked over. Other buildings had minor roof damage. Numerous trees and tree limbs were snapped, and corn was flattened in a convergent pattern.						
EFU	W of Lake Mattamuskeet	Hyde	NC	35.44°N 76.34°W	18:53–19:14	12.49 mi (20.10 km)	30 yd (27 m)
EFU	The tornado moved through cornfields and swamps, flattening crops. No established damage indicators were impacted.						
EF0	NW of Harrellsville	Hertford	NC	36.31°N 76.82°W	19:45–19:50	2.82 mi (4.54 km)	40 yd (37 m)
EF0	A few trees and numerous tree limbs were downed.						
EF0	SW of Lummis	City of Suffolk	VA	36.66°N 76.72°W	23:04–23:06	1.38 mi (2.22 km)	50 yd (46 m)
EF0	A few trees were snapped and tree limbs were broken off.						
EF0	Kings Fork	City of Suffolk	VA	36.77°N 76.61°W	23:16–23:17	0.89 mi (1.43 km)	40 yd (37 m)
EF0	A few trees were downed and tree limbs were broken.						
EF1	Westernville	Oneida	NY	43.30°N 75.39°W	23:30–23:36	2.16 mi (3.48 km)	100 yd (91 m)
EF1	Several homes in Westernville had their roofs blown off, and numerous trees were uprooted and snapped. Outside of town, a barn lost its roof and crops were damaged.						
EF0	Smithfield	Isle of Wight	VA	36.98°N 76.61°W	23:31–23:34	2.98 mi (4.80 km)	50 yd (46 m)
EF0	A weak tornado snapped trees and tree limbs. One tree fell on a house.						
EF0	Taylors Beach	Camden	NC	36.28°N 76.12°W	00:01–00:03	1.49 mi (2.40 km)	60 yd (55 m)
EF0	The roof was torn from a boat house and an outbuilding was destroyed by a fallen tree. Trees were uprooted and snapped.						

=== July 9 event ===
Events were associated with Hurricane Elsa.

List of confirmed tornadoes – Friday, July 9, 2021
EF#	Location	County / Parish	State	Start Coord.	Time (UTC)	Path length	Max width
EF1	Woodbine	Cape May	NJ	39.2358°N 74.7927°W	06:40–06:42	0.94 mi (1.51 km)	75 yd (69 m)
EF1	A picnic shelter was destroyed, with patio furniture and other debris scattered and the roof dropped into a swimming pool. A condominium office lost its front door and sustained a buckled wall. Fences were blown over and numerous trees were uprooted and snapped, with one tree falling on a house.						
EF0	Little Egg Harbor Township	Ocean	NJ	39.5704°N 74.3598°W	07:33–07:34	0.27 mi (0.43 km)	110 yd (100 m)
EF0	A few houses suffered minor damage and vinyl fences were blown down, with debris from one fence striking a home. Trees were snapped and uprooted and numerous tree limbs were downed.						

=== July 10 event ===
List of confirmed tornadoes – Saturday, July 10, 2021
EF#	Location	County / Parish	State	Start Coord.	Time (UTC)	Path length	Max width
EF1	W of Arenzville	Morgan	IL	39.8658°N 90.4488°W	18:55–18:58	0.90 mi (1.45 km)	75 yd (69 m)
EF1	Trees and power lines were downed.						
EF0	NNE of Littleton	Schuyler	IL	40.27°N 90.5988°W	19:00–19:02	0.11 mi (0.18 km)	50 yd (46 m)
EF0	A brief tornado damaged a pole barn and downed a few large tree limbs.						
EF0	Virginia	Cass	IL	39.9355°N 90.2493°W	19:22–19:35	3.2 mi (5.1 km)	75 yd (69 m)
EF0	A bus barn, greenhouse, and the porch of a house were damaged. Trees were uprooted, and Virginia High School sustained roof damage.						
EF1	SSW of Chandlerville	Cass	IL	40.0071°N 90.1816°W	19:44–19:51	2.42 mi (3.89 km)	75 yd (69 m)
EF1	A barn was leveled, and trees and crops sustained heavy damage.						
EFU	S of Newmansville	Cass	IL	39.9734°N 90.0451°W	20:16-20:17	0.07 mi (0.11 km)	10 yd (9.1 m)
EFU	A tornado briefly touched down near the intersection of Newmansville Road and Cox Creek Road. No damage occurred.						
EF1	NW of Clints Well	Coconino	AZ	34.5998°N 111.3216°W	00:01-00:06	1.25 mi (2.01 km)	300 yd (270 m)
EF1	Large trees were snapped.						
EF1	S of Yale	Payne	OK	36.088°N 96.72°W	00:25-00:27	1.4 mi (2.3 km)	100 yd (91 m)
EF1	Trees and power poles were snapped south of Yale, and several structures were damaged.						
EF2	Dexter	Stoddard	MO	36.8101°N 89.9985°W	01:18–01:29	5.8 mi (9.3 km)	175 yd (160 m)
EF2	150 homes in Dexter were damaged as a result of this multiple-vortex tornado. One home suffered significant roof loss, with half a dozen other homes sustaining heavy damage due to fallen trees. Several mobile homes were damaged or destroyed as well. Several garages were removed from their foundations, and three large buildings received major roof damage. A hospital had shattered windows, ceiling panels blown down, and a structure attached to the hospital was blown away. Vehicles were damaged from flying debris, including some with broken windows, and hundreds of trees were snapped or uprooted.						

=== July 11 event ===
List of confirmed tornadoes – Sunday, July 11, 2021
EF#	Location	County / Parish	State	Start Coord.	Time (UTC)	Path length	Max width
EF0	S of Chino Valley	Yavapai	AZ	34.73°N 112.45°W	00:10–00:11	0.7 mi (1.1 km)	10 yd (9.1 m)
EF0	A trained storm spotter observed a tornado. No damage was reported.						

=== July 12 event ===
List of confirmed tornadoes – Monday, July 12, 2021
EF#	Location	County / Parish	State	Start Coord.	Time (UTC)	Path length	Max width
EF0	WNW of Fisher	Champaign	IL	40.3391°N 88.3892°W	17:30–17:35	0.72 mi (1.16 km)	50 yd (46 m)
EF0	One wall of a machine shed was blown in and roof panels were removed and blown into a field.						

=== July 13 event ===
List of confirmed tornadoes – Monday, July 13, 2021
EF#	Location	County / Parish	State	Start Coord.	Time (UTC)	Path length	Max width
EF0	SE of Madrid	Santa Fe	NM	35.32°N 106.06°W	19:35–19:36	0.17 mi (0.27 km)	50 yd (46 m)
EF0	A brief landspout was reported by a spotter.						
EFU	Mona	Juab	UT	39.8181°N 111.8627°W	20:40–20:45	0.2 mi (0.32 km)	10 yd (9.1 m)
EFU	A rain shower produced a brief landspout in Mona, which was caught on video. No damage occurred.						

=== July 14 event ===
List of confirmed tornadoes – Wednesday, July 14, 2021
EF#	Location	County / Parish	State	Start Coord.	Time (UTC)	Path length	Max width
EF3	WSW of Lake City to WNW of Lohrville	Calhoun	IA	42.2605°N 94.7834°W	20:52–21:17	10.81 mi (17.40 km)	505 yd (462 m)
EF3	This large multiple-vortex tornado moved through Lake City, downing trees, signs, and power lines and also inflicting roof damage to homes. A bus shed was heavily damaged, and metal debris from the structure was thrown onto a nearby athletic field. The most severe damage occurred outside of town, where multiple large poultry barns were completely destroyed, and a two-story home at a farmstead sustained total loss of its second floor, and some collapse of first floor exterior walls. Trees were snapped and denuded, a couple of trucks were tossed or overturned, and barns and grain bins were destroyed as well. Damage was $2.5 million.						
EF0	NE of Stratford to NE of Stanhope	Hamilton	IA	42.2768°N 93.9128°W	21:05–21:23	8.85 mi (14.24 km)	50 yd (46 m)
EF0	This tornado remained over fields for most of its path, though it inflicted some tree damage on a farmstead shortly before roping out. Its track was enhanced using hi-resolution satellite imagery.						
EF1	NE of Stanhope to NE of Jewell	Hamilton	IA	42.3179°N 93.7623°W	21:21–21:40	8.87 mi (14.27 km)	160 yd (150 m)
EF1	This tornado remained over open fields for most of its path, though trees were snapped on two farmsteads.						
EFU	NW of Gowrie	Webster	IA	42.295°N 94.3519°W	21:46–21:47	0.31 mi (0.50 km)	30 yd (27 m)
EFU	A brief tornado was observed by storm chasers as it tracked through a field. Its path was determined using hi-res satellite imagery.						
EFU	SE of Allison	Butler	IA	42.7219°N 92.7616°W	21:57-21:59	1.19 mi (1.92 km)	50 yd (46 m)
EFU	A brief tornado was reported by a storm chaser southeast of Allison. Its track was determined using hi-res satellite imagery, since no damage indicators were impacted.						
EFU	S of Nemaha	Sac	IA	42.486°N 95.0992°W	22:11-22:13	0.6 mi (0.97 km)	25 yd (23 m)
EFU	A brief tornado was captured on video by a storm chaser as it tracked through a field.						
EF2	SW of Shell Rock to ESE of Waverly	Butler, Bremer	IA	42.6877°N 92.6161°W	22:16–22:43	12.88 mi (20.73 km)	630 yd (580 m)
EF2	This tornado touched down near Shell Rock and impacted several farmsteads, causing tree and structural damage. The most intense damaged occurred elsewhere as a well-built outbuilding was destroyed, severe tree damage occurred, and a high-voltage power line was downed. Minor tree and structure damage occurred in other areas along the path.						
EF1	SE of Nora Springs to SSW of Floyd	Floyd	IA	43.0951°N 92.9656°W	22:34–23:02	12.02 mi (19.34 km)	60 yd (55 m)
EF1	A barn was destroyed, tree limbs were broken, and corn was blown down.						
EFU	WSW of Lytton	Sac	IA	42.4174°N 94.9087°W	22:35-22:38	0.77 mi (1.24 km)	30 yd (27 m)
EFU	A storm chaser captured this tornado with a drone as it tracked through a field.						
EF0	NE of Rockwell	Cerro Gordo	IA	43.0161°N 93.1662°W	22:52–23:05	5.1 mi (8.2 km)	225 yd (206 m)
EF0	A grain bin was damaged and minor tree damage occurred. This tornado's path was determined using hi-res satellite imagery and a spotter report.						
EF0	E of Readlyn	Bremer	IA	42.7088°N 92.1195°W	23:12-23:18	2.5 mi (4.0 km)	150 yd (140 m)
EF0	Minor tree damage occurred on a farmstead. An emergency manager report and hi-res satellite imagery were used to determine the path of this tornado.						
EFU	N of Huntington	Emery	UT	39.3491°N 110.9613°W	23:15-23:20	0.09 mi (0.14 km)	10 yd (9.1 m)
EFU	A widely visible landspout touched down one mile north of Huntington.						
EF0	NW of Hazleton to Oelwein	Buchanan, Fayette	IA	42.64°N 91.95°W	23:43–23:53	3.18 mi (5.12 km)	30 yd (27 m)
EF0	A tornado impacted a high school in Oelwein, damaging the ticket booth and fencing, as well as ripping metal siding off stands. The sides of a greenhouse were blown out, the FFA's chicken coop was tipped over, and the school roof was lifted. At a nearby restaurant, an air handler unit was ripped off and windows were broken. Some crops and trees were damaged along the tornado's path.						
EF1	Southern Dysart	Tama, Benton	IA	42.1661°N 92.3193°W	00:05–00:19	5.65 mi (9.09 km)	590 yd (540 m)
EF1	A broad multi-vortex tornado caused EF1 damage to homes in southwestern Dysart, in addition to trees and farm outbuildings along its path.						
EFU	SW of Lamont	Buchanan	IA	42.58°N 91.72°W	00:10	0.1 mi (0.16 km)	10 yd (9.1 m)
EFU	A tornado briefly touched down in a field. No damage was reported.						
EFU	NW of Garrison	Benton	IA	42.20°N 92.22°W	00:19	0.1 mi (0.16 km)	10 yd (9.1 m)
EFU	A tornado briefly touched down in a field. No damage was reported.						
EFU	ESE of Garrison	Benton	IA	42.14°N 92.1°W	00:36	0.1 mi (0.16 km)	10 yd (9.1 m)
EFU	A tornado briefly touched down in a field. No damage was reported.						
EF1	SW of Manchester	Delaware	IA	42.457°N 91.527°W	00:50–00:53	1.39 mi (2.24 km)	40 yd (37 m)
EF1	Trees and tree limbs were snapped.						
EF1	SW of Manchester	Delaware	IA	42.467°N 91.491°W	00:54–00:56	1.12 mi (1.80 km)	30 yd (27 m)
EF1	Several outbuildings and a large show barn were damaged. A machine shed was destroyed.						
EFU	SE of Vinton	Benton	IA	42.14°N 91.94°W	00:56	0.1 mi (0.16 km)	10 yd (9.1 m)
EFU	A tornado briefly touched down in a field. No damage was reported.						
EFU	S of Vinton	Benton	IA	42.10°N 92.05°W	01:07	0.1 mi (0.16 km)	10 yd (9.1 m)
EFU	A tornado briefly touched down in a field. No damage was reported.						
EFU	ENE of Center Point	Linn	IA	42.20°N 91.66°W	01:50	0.1 mi (0.16 km)	10 yd (9.1 m)
EFU	A tornado briefly touched down in a field. No damage was reported.						
EFU	N of Center Point	Linn	IA	42.23°N 91.78°W	01:52	0.1 mi (0.16 km)	10 yd (9.1 m)
EFU	A tornado briefly touched down in a field. No damage was reported.						
EFU	S of Buck Creek	Delaware	IA	42.304°N 91.3491°W	02:40–02:41	0.36 mi (0.58 km)	10 yd (9.1 m)
EFU	High-resolution satellite imagery revealed a brief tornado in a corn field.						
EF1	SW of Monticello	Jones	IA	42.21°N 91.29°W	02:44–02:48	1.8 mi (2.9 km)	40 yd (37 m)
EF1	Outbuildings were damaged and large trees were snapped on two farms.						
EF1	SE of Monticello to S of Cascade	Jones	IA	42.21°N 91.14°W	03:02–03:20	8 mi (13 km)	30 yd (27 m)
EF1	The tornado moved through farmland and wooded areas. A farmstead was impacted near the end of its path, where an outbuilding was destroyed and a barn lost its roof.						
EF1	NE of Onslow	Jones	IA	42.15°N 90.96°W	03:30–03:34	3.13 mi (5.04 km)	30 yd (27 m)
EF1	This tornado tracked across rural areas, snapping several trees.						

=== July 17 event ===
List of confirmed tornadoes – Saturday, July 17, 2021
EF#	Location	County / Parish	State	Start Coord.	Time (UTC)	Path length	Max width
EF0	S of Wellington	Sumner	KS	37.2°N 97.4°W	00:27-00:28	0.01 mi (0.016 km)	25 yd (23 m)
EF0	A landspout very briefly touched down over open country.						
EF1	S of Columbus to Jacobstown	Burlington	NJ	40.051°N 74.722°W	02:25–02:36	7.75 mi (12.47 km)	300 yd (270 m)
EF1	Trees were uprooted or snapped and large tree limbs were broken. Some tree limbs fell on power lines.						

=== July 18 event ===
List of confirmed tornadoes – Sunday, July 18, 2021
EF#	Location	County / Parish	State	Start Coord.	Time (UTC)	Path length	Max width
EF0	Somers	Tolland	CT	41.9758°N 72.4474°W	22:11–22:18	1.9 mi (3.1 km)	75 yd (69 m)
EF0	Shingles were removed from the roof of a home. A playscape was lofted and landed 50 ft (15 m) away. Another home sustained damage to a corner of its roof. Trees were uprooted, twisted, and snapped. Two cars were destroyed by falling trees as well.						

=== July 20 event ===
List of confirmed tornadoes – Saturday, July 20, 2021
EF#	Location	County / Parish	State	Start Coord.	Time (UTC)	Path length	Max width
EF0	S of Sinton	San Patricio	TX	27.97°N 97.51°W	22:00	0.01 mi (0.016 km)	20 yd (18 m)
EF0	A brief landspout was observed by a storm chaser near Sinton.						

=== July 23 event ===
List of confirmed tornadoes – Saturday, July 23, 2021
EF#	Location	County / Parish	State	Start Coord.	Time (UTC)	Path length	Max width
EF0	W of Bernalillo	Sandoval	NM	35.3°N 106.58°W	20:30-20:31	0.03 mi (0.048 km)	20 yd (18 m)
EF0	A brief landspout was seen along the Rio Grande in NE Rio Rancho, but no damage was reported.						

=== July 24 event ===
List of confirmed tornadoes – Saturday, July 24, 2021
EF#	Location	County / Parish	State	Start Coord.	Time (UTC)	Path length	Max width
EF0	E of Port Austin	Huron	MI	44.039°N 82.969°W	20:36–20:40	2.88 mi (4.63 km)	110 yd (100 m)
EF0	A waterspout formed offshore of Port Austin. The waterspout moved onshore and destroyed an outbuilding. A fence was also damaged, as well as a field of soybean crops and some trees.						
EF1	S of Flushing	Genesee	MI	43.022°N 83.847°W	22:21–22:26	1.88 mi (3.03 km)	200 yd (180 m)
EF1	Three garages were either partially or completely destroyed. Some homes sustained minor roof and structural damage. Sporadic tree and crop damage occurred along the path.						
EF1	NNE of White Lake to SSW of Clarkston	Oakland	MI	42.6699°N 83.4966°W	23:54–23:59	1.65 mi (2.66 km)	400 yd (370 m)
EF1	Several homes were damaged, including shingle and roof damage. One home's garage door was completely blown off. Trees were snapped or uprooted, with some falling onto a home causing damage and injuring one person. The tornado eventually tracked into Pontiac Lake. While crossing the lake, the tornado damaged homes on two peninsulas before it dissipated.						
EF1	ENE of Romeo to NNE of Armada	Macomb	MI	42.8355°N 82.9075°W	23:54–00:08	3.45 mi (5.55 km)	700 yd (640 m)
EF1	This tornado caused considerable damage in Armada. One older home completely lost its roof, with some upper walls collapsing as a result. A couple other homes sustained severe roof damage, while many other homes received minor roof damage. Numerous trees were snapped or uprooted in town as well. The tornado exited Armada and tore a large section of roof from a home before dissipating.						

=== July 26 event ===
List of confirmed tornadoes – Monday, July 26, 2021
EF#	Location	County / Parish	State	Start Coord.	Time (UTC)	Path length	Max width
EF1	Red Lake	Beltrami	MN	47.88°N 95.02°W	22:13–22:15	0.83 mi (1.34 km)	300 yd (270 m)
EF1	A waterspout formed over the southern edge of Lower Red Lake and quickly moved onshore just east of Red Lake Senior High School. As the tornado crossed MN 1, it broke a light pole and toppled signage near a Humanities Center. Large portions of roofing and trim were torn from the building. Steel roofing panels were also torn off sheds at a MnDOT facility. Numerous trees were snapped or uprooted along the path.						
EF1	E of Redby	Beltrami	MN	47.89°N 94.87°W	22:16–22:22	4.06 mi (6.53 km)	300 yd (270 m)
EF1	Another waterspout formed over the southern edge of Lower Red Lake and quickly moved onshore just east of Redby. Many trees were snapped or uprooted as this tornado tracked through a heavily forested area.						
EF0	Nebish Township to WNW of Tenstrike	Beltrami	MN	47.78°N 94.86°W	22:23–22:36	8.53 mi (13.73 km)	200 yd (180 m)
EF0	Several trees were snapped along the path of this tornado.						

=== July 28 event ===
List of confirmed tornadoes – Wednesday, July 28, 2021
EF#	Location	County / Parish	State	Start Coord.	Time (UTC)	Path length	Max width
EFU	Northern Ogden	Weber	UT	41.2392°N 111.9817°W	23:30-23:31	0.21 mi (0.34 km)	10 yd (9.1 m)
EFU	A weak but well-formed landspout was widely observed.						
EF1	SE of Pine River	Lincoln, Marathon	WI	45.14°N 89.6°W	01:40–01:44	2.7 mi (4.3 km)	300 yd (270 m)
EF1	Widespread tree damage occurred along the path of this tornado.						
EF0	WNW of Bevent	Marathon	WI	44.7756°N 89.4464°W	02:18-02:19	0.22 mi (0.35 km)	100 yd (91 m)
EF0	Trees were uprooted and a power pole was damaged.						
EF1	SE of New Richmond	St. Croix	WI	45.0818°N 92.4822°W	02:48–02:56	5.66 mi (9.11 km)	100 yd (91 m)
EF1	A few houses sustained roof and exterior damage, one of which had its attached garage completely destroyed with debris strewn through a nearby farm field. Outbuildings were damaged or destroyed, and trees were snapped or uprooted.						
EF0	W of Borth	Waushara	WI	44.0993°N 88.9387°W	04:06-04:08	0.47 mi (0.76 km)	33 yd (30 m)
EF0	Crops were flattened and an outbuilding was damaged.						

=== July 29 event ===
List of confirmed tornadoes – Thursday, July 29, 2021
EF#	Location	County / Parish	State	Start Coord.	Time (UTC)	Path length	Max width	Summary
EF1	S of Portage	Columbia	WI	43.4968°N 89.489°W	05:10–05:13	2.25 mi (3.62 km)	100 yd (91 m)	Trees, outbuildings, and mobile homes were damaged. Storage trailers were thrown and destroyed.
EF0	NW of Columbus	Columbia	WI	43.3557°N 89.05°W	05:41–05:42	0.43 mi (0.69 km)	50 yd (46 m)	Minor tree and crop damage occurred.
EF0	Cross Plains	Dane	WI	43.1616°N 89.6873°W	05:41–05:45	4.78 mi (7.69 km)	50 yd (46 m)	A small, weak tornado moved through Cross Plains, snapping numerous tree branches.
EF1	SE of Cross Plains	Dane	WI	43.1136°N 89.6289°W	05:41–05:48	2.76 mi (4.44 km)	250 yd (230 m)	Trees were snapped or uprooted, and tree limbs were downed. Crop damage occurred, and a metal roof panel was ripped from a barn and thrown into a field.
EF1	West Middleton	Dane	WI	43.0759°N 89.5869°W	05:47–05:50	2.44 mi (3.93 km)	125 yd (114 m)	Many trees and tree limbs were downed in West Middleton, a few of which landed on homes. A garage door was also damaged by flying tree debris. Homes sustained minor shingle damage, and a house that was under construction sustained collapse of its roof and exterior walls.
EF0	Northern Verona	Dane	WI	43.0448°N 89.5538°W	05:48–05:58	3.52 mi (5.66 km)	75 yd (69 m)	A tornado moved through the northern part of Verona, downing trees and tree branches. One large but rotten tree trunk was snapped, a basketball hoop was blown over, and houses had fascia and gutters ripped off. Shingles were torn from the roof of an apartment building as well.
EF0	SW of Watertown	Jefferson	WI	43.1751°N 88.8024°W	06:05–06:13	5.95 mi (9.58 km)	100 yd (91 m)	Trees were damaged, outbuildings were destroyed, and a house had a large section of roofing torn off. Another home sustained siding damage as well.
EF1	SE of Watertown to NNE of Sullivan	Jefferson	WI	43.1208°N 88.6687°W	06:07–06:22	7.69 mi (12.38 km)	200 yd (180 m)	This tornado caused considerable damage to trees, outbuildings, and houses in and around the small community of Concord. Flag poles were bent over at a park in town, sheet metal was wrapped around power lines, and power poles were snapped. One tree fell through the roof of a home.
EF0	NW of Farmington	Jefferson	WI	43.1155°N 88.7444°W	06:07–06:12	3.6 mi (5.8 km)	25 yd (23 m)	Trees and tree limbs were downed, and a small airplane hangar had its door torn off by this brief, weak tornado.
EF1	W of Dousman	Jefferson, Waukesha	WI	43.0154°N 88.5471°W	06:23–06:28	4.67 mi (7.52 km)	150 yd (140 m)	Trees and tree branches were downed. One large tree fell on a house and other brought down power lines.
EF1	N of Dousman	Waukesha	WI	43.0358°N 88.4904°W	06:26–06:28	1.03 mi (1.66 km)	75 yd (69 m)	The tornado struck a small lake where it sunk boats and flipped docks. Part of a dock was thrown 150 ft (46 m) into the second floor of a home, and additional trees and tree limbs were downed before the tornado dissipated.
EF0	E of Wales	Waukesha	WI	43.0306°N 88.3464°W	06:32–06:38	2.44 mi (3.93 km)	50 yd (46 m)	Tree branches were snapped by this weak tornado.
EF1	Southwestern Waukesha	Waukesha	WI	42.985°N 88.3078°W	06:38–06:42	0.88 mi (1.42 km)	95 yd (87 m)	A brief tornado caused damage in a subdivision the southwest edge of Waukesha. Many trees were snapped or uprooted, and tree limbs were downed.
EF0	NE of Cochranton	Crawford	PA	41.5838°N 79.9634°W	16:40–16:41	0.57 mi (0.92 km)	75 yd (69 m)	A brief tornado unroofed two barns, destroyed a garage and blew it into a field, toppled a chimney, and blew a semi-truck off a road. Numerous trees were downed and corn was flattened.
EF0	Dempseytown	Venango	PA	41.499°N 79.795°W	16:55–16:56	0.27 mi (0.43 km)	15 yd (14 m)	A dozen pine trees were snapped, and one hardwood tree was uprooted by this small and brief tornado.
EF1	Saltlick Township	Fayette, Westmoreland	PA	40.1061°N 79.454°W	17:54–18:03	4.93 mi (7.93 km)	100 yd (91 m)	Barns, garages, and outbuildings were damaged or destroyed by this tornado. Damage to roofs and trees occurred as well.
EF1	Laurel Hill State Park	Somerset	PA	40.0099°N 79.2367°W	18:25–18:28	0.21 mi (0.34 km)	65 yd (59 m)	Numerous trees were snapped or uprooted. Some trees fell onto conservation buildings, causing damage.
EF1	SE of Stony Run to Weisenberg Township	Berks, Lehigh	PA	40.611°N 75.807°W	20:04–20:09	2.9 mi (4.7 km)	90 yd (82 m)	This tornado damaged and uprooted numerous trees, and caused roofing and crop damage along its path.
EF1	Slatington	Lehigh	PA	40.758°N 75.624°W	20:25–20:29	1.15 mi (1.85 km)	75 yd (69 m)	Several trees were snapped or uprooted as the tornado touched down at Northern Lehigh High School. The roof of a wooden dugout at the school's baseball field was torn off, and some metal bleachers were tossed. The tornado continued east to the Slatington Airport, where an airplane hangar door was blown out and a small plane was tossed. Tree damage was also observed at the airport before the tornado dissipated.
EF2	New Athens	Harrison	OH	40.19°N 81.01°W	20:50–21:00	2.73 mi (4.39 km)	220 yd (200 m)	This tornado caused considerable damage in and around New Athens, where a shed was completely swept away and destroyed with only the concrete foundation remaining. A few homes and other structures in town were damaged, including a house that lost much of its roof, with pieces of the roof being found as far as 1.4 mi (2.3 km) away in a field. Several power poles were snapped, wooden fence posts anchored in concrete were pulled out of the ground, and large trees were snapped or uprooted along the path.
EF2	ENE of Carrollton to SW of Salineville	Carroll	OH	40.627°N 80.995°W	20:59–21:11	6.16 mi (9.91 km)	150 yd (140 m)	A strong tornado cut a path of severe tree damage through a large wooded area, and one hillside was completely deforested, with many large trees snapped or uprooted. A farm home sustained broken windows and a toppled chimney. Crops were damaged, and a metal shed was destroyed as well.
EF0	Columbia	Howard	MD	39.1811°N 76.8219°W	21:07–21:08	0.29 mi (0.47 km)	50 yd (46 m)	A brief tornado struck the Snowden Square shopping mall along Snowden River Parkway, where a BJ's store had a section of its wall facade removed, and shopping carts were lofted and thrown. Small trees and large branches were snapped as well.
EF1	Western Bergholz	Jefferson	OH	40.542°N 80.908°W	21:15–21:21	2.17 mi (3.49 km)	300 yd (270 m)	This tornado downed numerous trees outside of town, and one house was damaged by falling trees and a power line. Numerous trees were snapped or uprooted in a small valley along the western fringes of Bergholz before the tornado dissipated.
EF0	S of Macksburg	Washington	OH	39.6187°N 81.4614°W	21:16–21:17	0.07 mi (0.11 km)	55 yd (50 m)	A tree was uprooted and some tree limbs were downed by this brief tornado.
EF0	E of Indiana	Indiana	PA	40.617°N 79.096°W	21:20–21:21	0.05 mi (0.080 km)	10 yd (9.1 m)	A very small and brief tornado ripped sheet metal roofing from a barn and tossed the pieces downwind. Minor crop damage occurred, and a wooden 2x4 was thrown and punctured through the exterior wall of a metal shed.
EF0	NE of New Holland	Pickaway	OH	39.5778°N 83.2372°W	21:20–21:22	0.86 mi (1.38 km)	50 yd (46 m)	A large outbuilding was destroyed and a single story home sustained roof damage. Two barns were also destroyed.
EF0	NW of Myerstown	Lebanon	PA	40.4295°N 76.3523°W	21:34–21:38	0.74 mi (1.19 km)	60 yd (55 m)	Trees were downed, a children's playset was blown over, a portable toilet was thrown 40 ft (12 m), a vehicle was moved a few feet, and crop damage occurred.
EF1	N of Gardenville to SW of Mechanicsville	Bucks	PA	40.393°N 75.106°W	21:40–21:45	2.69 mi (4.33 km)	70 yd (64 m)	A barn was heavily damaged with some walls collapsed. Trees and crops were damaged along the path, and several greenhouses were damaged as well.
EF1	Wintersville	Jefferson	OH	40.372°N 80.743°W	21:45–21:52	2.31 mi (3.72 km)	300 yd (270 m)	In Wintersville, one single-family home sustained destruction of its attached garage and had partial loss of its roof, while other homes sustained minor to moderate roof damage. Extensive tree and fence damage was also observed, and a wooden 2x4 was found lodged into the exterior wall of a church. Metal roofing and signs were damaged as well. One business, one church, and 23 homes were damaged in the Wintersville area.
EF0	Verona	Essex	NJ	40.8211°N 74.2459°W	21:54–21:57	0.35 mi (0.56 km)	50 yd (46 m)	Several trees and large limbs were knocked down, with one home left severely damaged by a fallen tree.
EF2	S of New Hope, PA to SE of Titusville, NJ	Bucks (PA), Hunterdon (NJ) Mercer (NJ)	PA, NJ	40.345°N 74.948°W	21:59–22:14	6.31 mi (10.15 km)	400 yd (370 m)	Trees were damaged as the tornado first touched down just outside of New Hope, PA along the west bank of the Delaware River. After crossing the river into New Jersey, the tornado briefly entered and exited Hunterdon County. As it entered Mercer County, countless large trees downed as the tornado moved through wooded areas. Significant tree damage continued farther along the path as the tornado crossed Baldpate Mountain, with numerous large hardwood trees snapped or uprooted. Many additional trees were downed as the tornado moved through Washington Crossing State Park and Titusville, lifting just before it reached heavily populated areas near Trenton Mercer Airport.
EF1	West Finley Township	Greene	PA	39.962°N 80.516°W	22:00–22:05	2.82 mi (4.54 km)	200 yd (180 m)	Large trees were uprooted, small trees were snapped, and large branches were broken.
EF0	Nanty-Glo	Cambria	PA	40.4803°N 78.8383°W	22:10–22:11	0.06 mi (0.097 km)	15 yd (14 m)	A weak tornado briefly touched down at Blacklick Valley High School, where bleachers were displaced near the football field, a portable toilet was knocked over, and a few trees were snapped.
EF0	ENE of Greenup	Cumberland	IL	39.2687°N 88.1056°W	22:40–22:43	0.52 mi (0.84 km)	50 yd (46 m)	Trees, crops, and a small outbuilding were damaged.
EF1	Windsor	Mercer	NJ	40.237°N 74.585°W	22:56–23:05	1.64 mi (2.64 km)	100 yd (91 m)	A Montessori School in town had a portion of its roofing material torn off. Numerous trees were snapped or uprooted as well.
EF3	Somerton to Bensalem	Philadelphia, Bucks	PA	40.130°N 75.005°W	23:04–23:12	3.4 mi (5.5 km)	530 yd (480 m)	A rain-wrapped low-end EF3 tornado caused major damage in the northeastern suburbs of Philadelphia, with the most intense damage occurring in Trevose and Bensalem. Several car dealership buildings sustained severe structural damage, with loss of roofs and exterior walls, and one building that largely collapsed. Many vehicles were flipped, thrown, or damaged by flying debris, and a large HVAC unit was thrown 200 yd (180 m). A storage trailer near one of the dealerships was lofted and dropped into an adjacent mobile home park, where multiple mobile homes were damaged, and one was completely destroyed. Seven warehouse buildings were damaged at an industrial park, one significantly, and a small utility building lost its roof. Several site-built homes, a church, a hotel, Walmart, Home Depot, and Lowe's sustained minor damage as well. A large billboard, many trees, fences, signs, light and flag poles, and power lines were also downed along the path. Five people were injured. This was the first EF3 tornado in Bucks County since reliable records began in 1950, and the first EF3 tornado in Pennsylvania since July 14, 2004.
EF0	Bustleton	Philadelphia	PA	40.082°N 75.033°W	23:07–23:08	0.44 mi (0.71 km)	40 yd (37 m)	A brief, weak tornado touched down in the Bustleton neighborhood of Northeast Philadelphia. An apartment complex and other buildings sustained minor roof and siding damage. One building had ceiling panels pulled downward, and insulation was removed from a car park area. Some trees were snapped as well. It is believed this was an anticyclonic tornado based on radar data.
EF1	SE of Shelbyville to W of Waldron	Shelby	IN	39.484°N 85.7357°W	23:58–00:04	2.50 mi (4.02 km)	50 yd (46 m)	Numerous trees were damaged, support beams on a porch were damaged, a masonry wall was knocked down, and an antenna pole was snapped.
EF1	S of Waldron	Shelby	IN	39.4265°N 85.6784°W	00:14–00:15	0.71 mi (1.14 km)	50 yd (46 m)	The tornado caused a narrow path of considerable tree damage. It also impacted a cemetery, knocking over numerous gravestones in different directions.
EF1	S of Palestine	Crawford	IL	38.9471°N 87.6053°W	00:20–00:22	0.39 mi (0.63 km)	75 yd (69 m)	Power poles were left leaning with power lines down. Debris from a nearby building was found in the power lines.
EF1	Woodland Township to Wells Mills County Park	Burlington, Ocean	NJ	39.775°N 74.397°W	00:42–00:51	6.52 mi (10.49 km)	250 yd (230 m)	Many trees were snapped or uprooted near the Cedar Bridge Tavern Historic Site and Wells Mills County Park.
EF2	Barnegat to Barnegat Light	Ocean	NJ	39.754°N 74.191°W	01:03–01:13	4.2 mi (6.8 km)	75 yd (69 m)	One building was damaged on the immediate western shore of Barnegat Bay as the tornado first developed. It moved over the bay as a waterspout. The waterspout became a tornado once again as it made landfall in High Bar Harbor, west of Barnegat Light. Multiple houses sustained partial to total roof loss, a car was moved, and some boats were flipped, moved, or damaged. Homes also had broken windows, siding stripped off, and damage to porches and sunrooms. A wooden 2x4 was speared through the exterior wall of one house, and a boat trailer was thrown 50 ft (15 m). Many trees and power poles were also snapped along the path. The tornado dissipated over a cove just west of Barnegat Light. 8 minor injuries were reported.

=== July 31 event ===
List of confirmed tornadoes – Saturday, July 31, 2021
EF#	Location	County / Parish	State	Start Coord.	Time (UTC)	Path length	Max width
EF0	NE of Farmington	St. Francois	MO	37.82°N 90.40°W	15:50–15:53	0.88 mi (1.42 km)	120 yd (110 m)
EF0	Two homes suffered roof and fascia damage, a well-built swing set was destroyed with parts thrown into a pond, and a well-built vinyl fence was destroyed. Large trees were uprooted and tree limbs were downed.						

== August ==
Confirmed tornadoes by Enhanced Fujita rating
EFU	EF0	EF1	EF2	EF3	EF4	EF5	Total
30	81	37	1	1	0	0	150

=== August 1 event ===
List of confirmed tornadoes – Sunday, August 1, 2021
EF#	Location	County / Parish	State	Start Coord.	Time (UTC)	Path length	Max width
EF0	S of Corolla	Currituck	NC	36.2951°N 75.8094°W	16:14–16:18	0.52 mi (0.84 km)	100 yd (91 m)
EF0	A house lost shingles, several large trees were knocked down, and tree limbs were snapped.						

=== August 2 event ===
List of confirmed tornadoes – Monday, August 2, 2021
EF#	Location	County / Parish	State	Start Coord.	Time (UTC)	Path length	Max width
EF0	N of New Smyrna Beach	Volusia	FL	29.0782°N 80.9548°W	18:40–18:41	0.5 mi (0.80 km)	25 yd (23 m)
EF0	A couple of small trees were knocked down and medium to large-sized tree branches were snapped. The tornado became a waterspout as it moved over the Intracoastal Waterway before dissipating.						
EF0	N of Bolivar Peninsula	Galveston	TX	29.5231°N 94.5721°W	23:35–23:36	0.72 mi (1.16 km)	20 yd (18 m)
EF0	A brief waterspout moved onshore, causing no damage.						

=== August 7 event ===
List of confirmed tornadoes – Saturday, August 7, 2021
EF#	Location	County / Parish	State	Start Coord.	Time (UTC)	Path length	Max width
EF0	NW of Boykins	Southampton	VA	36.592°N 77.227°W	17:47–17:49	1.39 mi (2.24 km)	25 yd (23 m)
EF0	A weak tornado snapped one tree, downed several small pine trees, and snapped tree limbs.						
EF3	SW of Boscobel to NNW of Castle Rock	Grant	WI	43.1305°N 90.7199°W	21:29–21:56	9.38 mi (15.10 km)	1,100 yd (1,000 m)
EF3	See article on this tornado						
EF1	N of Highland	Iowa	WI	43.0799°N 90.3937°W	22:09–22:24	7.72 mi (12.42 km)	50 yd (46 m)
EF1	Two barns and some trees were damaged.						

=== August 8 event ===
List of confirmed tornadoes – Sunday, August 8, 2021
EF#	Location	County / Parish	State	Start Coord.	Time (UTC)	Path length	Max width
EF1	SW of Coloma	Waushara	WI	43.983°N 89.5544°W	20:52–20:58	3.48 mi (5.60 km)	350 yd (320 m)
EF1	One house lost its porch roof, one sustained minor shingle damage, and another had broken windows. A barn door was blown in. Trees were uprooted and snapped.						
EFU	NW of Ocheyedan	Osceola	IA	43.454°N 95.583°W	21:36–21:38	0.79 mi (1.27 km)	40 yd (37 m)
EFU	This tornado was confirmed based on Sentinel-2 satellite imagery. No damage was found.						
EF0	Ocheyedan	Osceola	IA	43.415°N 95.546°W	21:47–21:52	2.42 mi (3.89 km)	50 yd (46 m)
EF0	A small portion of the roof of a chicken barn was damaged. Some trees were damaged.						
EF0	NW of Qulin	Butler	MO	36.64°N 90.302°W	00:14–00:15	0.11 mi (0.18 km)	50 yd (46 m)
EF0	A brief tornado damaged a residence. A porch roof covering was lifted over the residence, and trees were snapped.						
EFU	NW of Varina	Buena Vista	IA	42.698°N 94.923°W	01:12–01:13	0.31 mi (0.50 km)	20 yd (18 m)
EFU	This tornado was confirmed based on Sentinel-2 satellite imagery. No damage was found.						
EFU	ESE of Moorland	Webster	IA	42.4292°N 94.2684°W	04:00–04:06	1.65 mi (2.66 km)	150 yd (140 m)
EFU	This tornado was confirmed based on Sentinel-2 satellite imagery. No damage was found.						
EFU	SW of Otho	Webster	IA	42.3844°N 94.1794°W	04:19–04:25	1.7 mi (2.7 km)	150 yd (140 m)
EFU	This tornado was confirmed based on Sentinel-2 satellite imagery. No damage was found.						
EFU	NNW of Harcourt	Webster	IA	42.3149°N 94.2042°W	04:47–04:54	1.86 mi (2.99 km)	160 yd (150 m)
EFU	This tornado was confirmed based on Sentinel-2 satellite imagery. No damage was found.						

=== August 9 event ===
List of confirmed tornadoes – Monday, August 9, 2021
EF#	Location	County / Parish	State	Start Coord.	Time (UTC)	Path length	Max width
EFU	NE of Harcourt	Webster	IA	42.2877°N 94.1444°W	05:02–05:06	1.36 mi (2.19 km)	40 yd (37 m)
EFU	This tornado was confirmed based on Sentinel-2 satellite imagery. No damage was found.						
EFU	ENE of Harcourt	Webster	IA	42.274°N 94.1342°W	05:06–05:07	0.49 mi (0.79 km)	15 yd (14 m)
EFU	This tornado was confirmed based on Sentinel-2 satellite imagery. No damage was found.						
EF0	NW of Clinton	Rock	WI	42.5579°N 88.9093°W	19:52–20:06	3.24 mi (5.21 km)	25 yd (23 m)
EF0	A brief tornado caused minor tree damage.						
EF0	N of Esmond	DeKalb	IL	42.0538°N 88.9383°W	21:35–21:36	0.1 mi (0.16 km)	20 yd (18 m)
EF0	A brief, weak tornado damaged the roof of an outbuilding.						
EF1	S of Kirkland	DeKalb	IL	42.0628°N 88.8742°W	21:44–21:47	1.8 mi (2.9 km)	80 yd (73 m)
EF1	This brief tornado heavily damaged a barn at a farm and damaged crops.						
EF1	Northern McHenry	McHenry	IL	42.3622°N 88.2786°W	21:45–21:46	0.4 mi (0.64 km)	70 yd (64 m)
EF1	This tornado briefly touched down in the northern part of McHenry, where a townhouse complex sustained partial roof loss. A barn and ground marker were damaged at the historic Colby-Petersen Farm, and a few other structures sustained damage to their siding and porches.						
EF1	S of Burlington	Kane	IL	42.0472°N 88.5905°W	22:24–22:39	3.8 mi (6.1 km)	100 yd (91 m)
EF1	A house was damaged and had its garage door blown in, trees were downed, crops were damaged, and a large outbuilding was damaged as well.						
EF0	NE of Hillcrest to N of Malta	Ogle, DeKalb	IL	42.0024°N 89.0029°W	22:28–22:47	6.8 mi (10.9 km)	50 yd (46 m)
EF0	A couple of outbuildings were damaged or destroyed, and vegetation was damaged.						
EFU	N of Paw Paw	Lee	IL	41.7068°N 89.0050°W	23:03–23:08	1.3 mi (2.1 km)	75 yd (69 m)
EFU	This tornado caused crop damage in a corn field.						
EFU	SE of Van Orin	Bureau	IL	41.53°N 89.34°W	23:13–23:14	0.01 mi (0.016 km)	5 yd (4.6 m)
EFU	A tornado briefly touched down in a field. No damage was reported.						
EF1	SE of Sycamore	DeKalb	IL	41.9623°N 88.6706°W	23:13–23:18	1.5 mi (2.4 km)	150 yd (140 m)
EF1	This tornado was caught on video by numerous storm chasers. Multiple farms were struck by the tornado, with many outbuildings being damaged or completely destroyed. Numerous trees were snapped, and homes sustained roof damage and shattered windows.						
EF0	ESE of Sycamore	DeKalb	IL	41.9526°N 88.6043°W	23:26–23:37	0.2 mi (0.32 km)	20 yd (18 m)
EF0	A brief tornado caused minor tree damage.						
EF0	ESE of Sycamore to S of Virgil	Kane	IL	41.9507°N 88.5961°W	23:28–23:37	3.9 mi (6.3 km)	400 yd (370 m)
EF0	This tornado impacted several farms, damaging or destroying outbuildings and silos. A house sustained minor roof damage, and a storage trailer was flipped onto its side. Crops and trees were damaged as well.						
EFU	SE of Virgil	Kane	IL	41.9444°N 88.5059°W	23:38–23:39	0.1 mi (0.16 km)	10 yd (9.1 m)
EFU	This brief tornado caused no damage.						
EF1	NE of Zearing to W of Arlington	Bureau	IL	41.47°N 89.3°W	23:57–00:15	3.0 mi (4.8 km)	525 yd (480 m)
EF1	Four farmsteads were damaged by this tornado. Three sheds and a well-built outbuilding were destroyed, trees were snapped, and corn and soybean crops were damaged.						
EF1	W of Starkweather	Towner, Ramsey	ND	48.4500°N 98.9900°W	00:16–00:23	4.97 mi (8.00 km)	200 yd (180 m)
EF1	Several large cottonwood trees were snapped.						
EFU	NE of Wyanet to NW of Princeton	Bureau	IL	41.41°N 89.55°W	00:24–00:26	1.11 mi (1.79 km)	100 yd (91 m)
EFU	Corn and soybean crops were damaged.						
EF0	E of Binford	Griggs	ND	47.5600°N 98.2800°W	01:34–01:35	0.26 mi (0.42 km)	50 yd (46 m)
EF0	A brief tornado was caught on video. No damage occurred as the tornado remained over an open field.						
EF2	NNE of Sharon	Steele	ND	47.6700°N 97.8700°W	02:20–02:28	2.88 mi (4.63 km)	300 yd (270 m)
EF2	A barn was completely destroyed at a farmstead, and numerous hardwood trees were snapped or uprooted along the path.						
EF1	WNW of Northwood	Grand Forks	ND	47.7600°N 97.6700°W	02:42–02:43	1.09 mi (1.75 km)	150 yd (140 m)
EF1	A few cottonwood trees were snapped or uprooted.						
EF1	SE of Davidson	Polk	MN	47.86°N 96.85°W	03:55–04:01	3.65 mi (5.87 km)	200 yd (180 m)
EF1	Two walls and the roof of a pole shed were torn off. Steel siding and roofing of several farm buildings were peeled at a farmstead. Some debris was thrown up to 500 yd (460 m) to the east and southeast. Roof trim, shingles, and siding was damaged at three other farmsteads. Several trees were snapped.						
EF0	SE of Key West	Polk	MN	47.89°N 96.73°W	04:05–04:09	2.24 mi (3.60 km)	150 yd (140 m)
EF0	The tops of several trees were snapped. A power pole was cracked near its base.						

=== August 10 event ===
List of confirmed tornadoes – Tuesday, August 10, 2021
EF#	Location	County / Parish	State	Start Coord.	Time (UTC)	Path length	Max width
EF0	SE of Jetmore	Hodgeman	KS	38.0146°N 99.7541°W	21:43–21:48	0.22 mi (0.35 km)	50 yd (46 m)
EF0	A landspout tornado was observed by law enforcement. No damage was found.						
EF0	WNW of Odessa	Pasco	FL	28.21°N 82.62°W	21:50	0.1 mi (0.16 km)	25 yd (23 m)
EF0	Multiple-vortex tornado collapsed a pool enclosure attached to a home. Light roof damage was also observed.						
EF1	SE of Leeman to SSW of Nichols	Outagamie	WI	44.5383°N 88.5296°W	22:58–23:11	2.05 mi (3.30 km)	40 yd (37 m)
EF1	A home suffered roof and siding damage, a car was flipped, and a 6,500 lb (2,900 kg) trailer was moved 20 feet (6 m).						
EFU	NNE of Esmond	DeKalb	IL	42.0394°N 88.9328°W	23:33–23:34	0.6 mi (0.97 km)	20 yd (18 m)
EFU	This tornado was confirmed based on high resolution satellite imagery. No damage was found.						

=== August 11 event ===
List of confirmed tornadoes – Wednesday, August 11, 2021
EF#	Location	County / Parish	State	Start Coord.	Time (UTC)	Path length	Max width
EF1	Fayette	Fulton	OH	41.6664°N 84.3284°W	18:40–18:42	0.21 mi (0.34 km)	70 yd (64 m)
EF1	Homes in town sustained roof, gutter, and window damage. Pieces of sheet metal were torn from the roof of one home and thrown 200 yd (180 m), damaging the roof of a school. Many trees and tree limbs were snapped, and one tree branch was thrown into a house, causing significant damage to a balcony. A large metal shipping container was shifted 2 ft (0.61 m) as well.						
EF1	N of Norwalk	Monroe	WI	43.8562°N 90.6415°W	18:45–18:59	5.91 mi (9.51 km)	80 yd (73 m)
EF1	A barn was destroyed and hardwood trees were snapped near the start of the path. Much of the path consisted only of sporadic tree and crop damage.						
EF1	N of Wilton	Monroe	WI	43.8608°N 90.5112°W	18:55–19:02	2.77 mi (4.46 km)	75 yd (69 m)
EF1	Intermittent crop and tree damage was found using satellite imagery.						
EFU	WSW of Middle Point	Van Wert	OH	40.8405°N 84.5042°W	18:49–18:52	1.97 mi (3.17 km)	30 yd (27 m)
EFU	The tornado moved through open fields, with damage limited to crops.						
EFU	E of Venedocia to ENE of Southworth	Van Wert, Allen	OH	40.7749°N 84.4121°W	19:00–19:09	4.66 mi (7.50 km)	50 yd (46 m)
EFU	Damage was limited to crops.						
EF0	S of Angelica	Shawano	WI	44.6594°N 88.3125°W	19:08–19:09	0.37 mi (0.60 km)	41 yd (37 m)
EF0	A brief tornado was captured in pictures and video. Outbuildings were damaged and trees were downed.						
EF0	Pulaski	Brown, Oconto	WI	44.6749°N 88.245°W	19:14–19:22	2.27 mi (3.65 km)	75 yd (69 m)
EF0	This weak tornado downed trees and power lines in Pulaski.						
EF0	SSW of Epworth	Dubuque	IA	42.4°N 90.96°W	22:40–22:43	0.6 mi (0.97 km)	20 yd (18 m)
EF0	The tornado moved through cornfields and a section of timber. Tree limbs were damaged and the top of one tree was broken.						
EF0	SSW of Linden	Iowa	WI	42.8982°N 90.2904°W	23:08–23:09	0.12 mi (0.19 km)	25 yd (23 m)
EF0	Minor crop damage occurred in a field with a clear convergent pattern.						
EF0	ENE of Mineral Point	Iowa	WI	42.8748°N 90.1129°W	23:12–23:14	1 mi (1.6 km)	25 yd (23 m)
EF0	Minor crop damage occurred in a field with a clear convergent pattern.						
EF0	W of Dorr	Allegan	MI	42.7375°N 85.8041°W	01:01–01:05	2.82 mi (4.54 km)	100 yd (91 m)
EF0	An outbuilding was destroyed with metal debris scattered. Other structures sustained minor roof damage. Trees were damaged.						

=== August 12 event ===
List of confirmed tornadoes – Thursday, August 12, 2021
EF#	Location	County / Parish	State	Start Coord.	Time (UTC)	Path length	Max width
EF0	SW of Cypress	Harris	TX	29.922°N 95.7281°W	21:32–21:34	0.25 mi (0.40 km)	10 yd (9.1 m)
EF0	A brief landspout tornado downed five power poles.						

=== August 13 event ===
List of confirmed tornadoes – Friday, August 13, 2021
EF#	Location	County / Parish	State	Start Coord.	Time (UTC)	Path length	Max width
EF0	SW of Spring Creek	Elko	NV	40.67°N 115.67°W	00:15	0.1 mi (0.16 km)	15 yd (14 m)
EF0	A very brief landspout tornado lasted for 10 seconds causing no damage.						

=== August 17 event ===
Events were associated with Tropical Storm Fred.

List of confirmed tornadoes – Tuesday, August 17, 2021
EF#	Location	County / Parish	State	Start Coord.	Time (UTC)	Path length	Max width
EF1	Americus	Sumter	GA	32.0775°N 84.2087°W	05:25–05:27	1.23 mi (1.98 km)	325 yd (297 m)
EF1	Some homes in town lost shingles. Many trees were snapped or uprooted, with some falling onto homes causing damage.						
EF0	WSW of Rocky Mount to SW of Lone Oak	Meriwether	GA	33.1523°N 84.7178°W	08:34–08:39	3.36 mi (5.41 km)	150 yd (140 m)
EF0	Trees were downed.						
EF0	NE of District Path	Twiggs	GA	32.6123°N 83.3609°W	09:47–09:53	2.6 mi (4.2 km)	150 yd (140 m)
EF0	Boats were flipped, a retail building sustained minor roof damage, and the wall of a small pump station collapsed. Trees were downed.						
EF1	N of Carey to NNE of Greshamville	Greene	GA	33.5824°N 83.2554°W	10:24–10:32	5.6 mi (9.0 km)	100 yd (91 m)
EF1	Many homes sustained minor damage, including one with blown-out windows, and a few suffered significant damage from falling trees. Boathouses, outbuildings, and sheds were destroyed. Numerous trees and tree limbs were downed.						
EF0	ENE of Greenberry Crossroads to SW of Coopers	Baldwin, Jones	GA	32.9429°N 83.3521°W	10:27–10:31	1.86 mi (2.99 km)	150 yd (140 m)
EF0	Trees were uprooted and snapped.						
EF1	WNW of Danielsville to W of Ila	Madison	GA	34.1387°N 83.2653°W	12:20–12:29	5.94 mi (9.56 km)	150 yd (140 m)
EF1	Several houses were damaged; one lost part of its roof and another was damaged by a large tree. Two barns were destroyed, a large camper was flipped, and several outbuildings were damaged. Numerous trees were uprooted and snapped.						
EF1	E of Homer to SW of Pinefield Crossroads	Banks	GA	34.333°N 83.4161°W	14:24–14:31	5.69 mi (9.16 km)	100 yd (91 m)
EF1	A small trailer was thrown 30 yd (27 m). Several trees were snapped or uprooted. One home was nearly crushed by a fallen tree.						
EF1	S of Scotts to W of Stony Point	Iredell, Alexander	NC	35.804°N 81.022°W	15:15–15:25	5.09 mi (8.19 km)	200 yd (180 m)
EF1	Damage was mostly limited to uprooted hardwood and snapped softwood trees. A couple homes sustained very minor damage.						
EF0	WSW of Six Mile	Oconee	SC	34.797°N 82.928°W	16:50	0.14 mi (0.23 km)	50 yd (46 m)
EF0	A brief tornado uprooted trees, one of which fell on a home.						
EF0	SE of Osbornville	Wilkes	NC	36.0669°N 80.8831°W	16:54–16:56	0.74 mi (1.19 km)	40 yd (37 m)
EF0	One home sustained minor roof and siding damage. Multiple trees were snapped or uprooted.						
EF0	NNE of Sandy Springs	Anderson	SC	34.621°N 82.725°W	16:59	0.15 mi (0.24 km)	50 yd (46 m)
EF0	A brief tornado uprooted trees.						
EF1	WNW of Murphy's Estates	Edgefield	SC	33.6259°N 82.0096°W	17:03–17:07	1.51 mi (2.43 km)	100 yd (91 m)
EF1	A small shed was destroyed and trees were uprooted and snapped.						
EF0	Clingman	Wilkes	NC	36.1725°N 80.9278°W	17:11–17:13	0.68 mi (1.09 km)	75 yd (69 m)
EF0	An outbuilding collapsed, and a chicken coop and two homes were damaged. Trees were snapped or uprooted.						
EF0	E of Mountain City	Rabun	GA	34.898°N 83.282°W	18:34	0.02 mi (0.032 km)	25 yd (23 m)
EF0	Trees and tree limbs were downed. The path was likely longer, but it extended into rough terrain and private property that could not be surveyed.						
EF1	Mauldin	Greenville	SC	34.765°N 82.3°W	18:53–18:57	2.4 mi (3.9 km)	75 yd (69 m)
EF1	Multiple trees were snapped or uprooted in Mauldin, and some minor damage to roofs and siding occurred.						
EF1	WNW of Summit to WSW of Chapin	Lexington, Newberry	SC	33.9508°N 81.4697°W	19:31–19:57	14.26 mi (22.95 km)	250 yd (230 m)
EF1	The tornado initially produced minor tree damage. It then crossed Lake Murray and uprooted and snapped more trees. Several fell on and damaged homes, a boat house, and two boats. This tornado occurred at the same time as the Leesville tornado to the west.						
EF0	N of Leesville	Lexington, Saluda	SC	33.9713°N 81.4971°W	19:33–19:43	4.32 mi (6.95 km)	50 yd (46 m)
EF0	The tornado caused sporadic, mostly minor tree damage. This tornado occurred at the same time as the Summit tornado to the east.						
EF1	NNW of Brookdale	Orangeburg	SC	33.59°N 80.8721°W	21:40–21:43	0.90 mi (1.45 km)	50 yd (46 m)
EF1	A church sustained minor roof damage and fences were damaged by tornadic winds and falling tree limbs. Trees were uprooted and snapped and tree limbs were broken.						
EF0	SE of Fountain Inn	Laurens	SC	34.657°N 82.168°W	22:07	0.20 mi (0.32 km)	30 yd (27 m)
EF0	A small tornado touched down and was caught on video. No damage could be found.						
EF1	NE of Fountain Inn	Laurens	SC	34.728°N 82.144°W	22:18–22:21	1.4 mi (2.3 km)	75 yd (69 m)
EF1	A shed was destroyed and a home received minor roof damage. Multiple trees were snapped or uprooted. One tree fell onto a home, damaging it.						
EF0	NNW of Batesburg	Saluda	SC	33.9777°N 81.5821°W	00:47–00:48	0.11 mi (0.18 km)	25 yd (23 m)
EF0	A very weak, brief tornado snapped a couple trees.						

=== August 18 event ===
Event was associated with Tropical Storm Fred.

List of confirmed tornadoes – Wednesday, August 18, 2021
EF#	Location	County / Parish	State	Start Coord.	Time (UTC)	Path length	Max width
EF0	Valley View	Schuylkill	PA	40.6474°N 76.5331°W	16:46–16:47	0.13 mi (0.21 km)	10 yd (9.1 m)
EF0	A very weak, brief tornado caused minor roof damage to a few homes in town and downed a few apple trees in an orchard.						
EF0	N of Hampton	Adams	PA	39.9391°N 77.0619°W	19:16–19:18	0.62 mi (1.00 km)	75 yd (69 m)
EF0	Some trees were downed and large tree branches were snapped. Some corn crops were damaged.						
EF0	NE of Middleburg	Snyder	PA	40.798°N 76.991°W	20:35–20:36	0.45 mi (0.72 km)	15 yd (14 m)
EF0	An intermittent tornado caused minor roof damage to a house and garage, flipped a horse trailer, and toppled a tree over onto a fence. Some additional trees were damaged and corn was damaged in a convergent pattern.						
EF1	SE of Halifax	Dauphin	PA	40.4506°N 76.9074°W	22:31–22:37	5.54 mi (8.92 km)	150 yd (140 m)
EF1	A barn lost a section of its roof, trees were uprooted and snapped, and a small amount of wheat was flattened.						
EF0	North Hopewell Township	York	PA	39.856°N 76.627°W	00:35–00:37	0.68 mi (1.09 km)	125 yd (114 m)
EF0	Two homes sustained minor damage and a wooden swing set was damaged. Trees were uprooted, snapped, and had their tops sheared off.						
EF1	Tilden Township	Berks	PA	40.525°N 76.001°W	01:15–01:18	1.10 mi (1.77 km)	125 yd (114 m)
EF1	A house lost its porch roof and had damage to its main roof. Skirting was blown from a mobile home. Numerous trees were uprooted and snapped; some fell on cars.						

=== August 19 event ===
Events in the Northeast were associated with Tropical Storm Fred.

List of confirmed tornadoes – Thursday, August 19, 2021
EF#	Location	County / Parish	State	Start Coord.	Time (UTC)	Path length	Max width
EF1	Hatfield Township to Hilltown Township	Montgomery, Bucks	PA	40.284°N 75.322°W	04:25–04:30	8.76 mi (14.10 km)	140 yd (130 m)
EF1	One business lost part of its roof, a garage lost its metal roof, and several homes suffered roof and siding damage. Trees and tree limbs were downed.						
EF0	Rockaway	Morris	NJ	40.902°N 74.533°W	06:38–06:40	0.87 mi (1.40 km)	50 yd (46 m)
EF0	Several pine trees, tree branches, and part of a fence were brought down by this weak tornado.						
EF0	Thompson, CT to Webster, MA	Windham (CT), Worcester (MA)	CT, MA	41.9942°N 71.898°W	14:15–14:24	4.64 mi (7.47 km)	50 yd (46 m)
EF0	An intermittent tornado downed numerous trees and power lines and caused minor property damage. It dissipated as a waterspout on Lake Chaubunagungamaug.						
EF0	Clinton	Worcester	MA	42.4153°N 71.6793°W	17:30–17:31	0.54 mi (0.87 km)	35 yd (32 m)
EF0	Trees were downed in Clinton as a result of this weak tornado.						
EF1	SE of Holyoke	Phillips	CO	40.52°N 102.11°W	23:07–23:12	0.01 mi (0.016 km)	50 yd (46 m)
EF1	Two outbuildings were destroyed and a semi trailer was rolled.						
EF0	ESE of Holyoke	Phillips	CO	40.55°N 102.13°W	23:09–23:10	0.01 mi (0.016 km)	25 yd (23 m)
EF0	A brief tornado was observed by a storm chaser. No damage occurred as the tornado remained in an open field.						
EF0	SE of Holyoke	Phillips	CO	40.53°N 102.14°W	23:20–23:30	0.02 mi (0.032 km)	25 yd (23 m)
EF0	A brief tornado was observed by a storm chaser. No damage occurred as the tornado remained in an open field.						

=== August 20 event ===
List of confirmed tornadoes – Friday, August 20, 2021
EF#	Location	County / Parish	State	Start Coord.	Time (UTC)	Path length	Max width
EF0	S of Sibley	Osceola	IA	43.334°N 95.793°W	20:34–20:41	3.64 mi (5.86 km)	20 yd (18 m)
EF0	A small shed was overturned, a camper was tossed into another shed, destroying it, and a highway sign was destroyed. Tree limbs were downed.						
EF0	E of Erie	Cass	ND	47.107°N 97.3108°W	21:18–21:19	0.4 mi (0.64 km)	40 yd (37 m)
EF0	Tree branches and corn stalks were seen swirling by storm chasers.						
EFU	ENE of Sunburg	Kandiyohi	MN	45.3935°N 95.0931°W	23:30–23:31	0.08 mi (0.13 km)	10 yd (9.1 m)
EFU	A brief tornado was caught on video, causing no damage.						
EF0	Belgrade	Stearns	MN	45.4506°N 95.003°W	23:42–23:48	2.12 mi (3.41 km)	50 yd (46 m)
EF0	A few shingles were taken off of the roof of a home. Several trees and tree branches were downed.						
EFU	SSW of Palmer	Pocahontas	IA	42.5925°N 94.6291°W	01:03–01:05	1.18 mi (1.90 km)	20 yd (18 m)
EFU	This tornado was confirmed by high resolution satellite imagery. No damage was found.						
EFU	SW of Rutland	Humboldt	IA	42.7365°N 94.3464°W	01:19–01:22	2.16 mi (3.48 km)	60 yd (55 m)
EFU	This tornado was confirmed by high resolution satellite imagery. No damage was found.						
EF0	NNE of Goldfield	Wright	IA	42.7606°N 93.9139°W	02:05–02:10	4.05 mi (6.52 km)	190 yd (170 m)
EF0	This tornado was confirmed by high resolution satellite imagery. Minor tree damage occurred at a farmstead.						

=== August 21 event ===
List of confirmed tornadoes – Saturday, August 21, 2021
EF#	Location	County / Parish	State	Start Coord.	Time (UTC)	Path length	Max width
EF0	NW of Charlotte	Dickson	TN	36.2019°N 87.4151°W	22:58–22:59	0.5 mi (0.80 km)	50 yd (46 m)
EF0	Numerous trees were blown down in a convergent pattern. This tornado was discovered in June 2022 via high-resolution satellite imagery.						
EF1	Iuka	Tishomingo	MS	34.8445°N 88.2132°W	23:09-23:17	3.48 mi (5.60 km)	200 yd (180 m)
EF1	This tornado initially caused mainly tree damage, before strengthening as it moved towards the center of Iuka, where several homes suffered roof damage and storage buildings were damaged or destroyed. This tornado formed in an area where no tornado risk had been delineated by the Storm Prediction Center, under an unstable airmass and a weak upper-level disturbance.						
EF0	SE of Iuka	Tishomingo	MS	34.7908°N 88.1551°W	23:22–23:23	0.49 mi (0.79 km)	50 yd (46 m)
EF0	Trees were damaged near County Road 247.						

=== August 22 event ===
List of confirmed tornadoes – Sunday, August 22, 2021
EF#	Location	County / Parish	State	Start Coord.	Time (UTC)	Path length	Max width
EF0	S of Devils Lake	Ramsey	ND	48.06°N 98.8553°W	23:02–23:03	0.31 mi (0.50 km)	25 yd (23 m)
EF0	A brief waterspout formed and dissipated over Devils Lake.						
EF0	SE of Butler	Day	SD	45.22°N 97.55°W	00:55–00:56	0.04 mi (0.064 km)	10 yd (9.1 m)
EF0	A brief tornado touched down causing no damage.						

=== August 23 event ===
Event was associated with Hurricane Henri.

List of confirmed tornadoes – Monday, August 23, 2021
EF#	Location	County / Parish	State	Start Coord.	Time (UTC)	Path length	Max width
EF0	Marlborough	Worcester, Middlesex	MA	42.311°N 71.577°E	15:40–15:42	0.75 mi (1.21 km)	10 yd (9.1 m)
EF0	A brief tornado lofted tree branches and toppled a tree onto two cars in Marlborough, damaging them.						
EF0	Bolton	Worcester	MA	42.4357°N 71.5001°W	16:30	0.1 mi (0.16 km)	50 yd (46 m)
EF0	A brief tornado touched down in Bolton and knocked one tree over into wires, and tore a large branch from another tree.						
EF0	Stow	Middlesex	MA	42.438°N 71.565°W	17:10	0.1 mi (0.16 km)	50 yd (46 m)
EF0	A brief tornado knocked down one tree, and brought down a large tree branch across a road in town.						

=== August 25 event ===
List of confirmed tornadoes – Wednesday, August 25, 2021
EF#	Location	County / Parish	State	Start Coord.	Time (UTC)	Path length	Max width
EFU	SW of Geneseo	Henry	IL	41.4°N 90.21°W	20:39–20:40	0.01 mi (0.016 km)	10 yd (9.1 m)
EFU	A landspout tornado damaged crops.						
EFU	SE of Berwick	Warren	IL	40.77°N 90.47°W	21:48–21:49	0.11 mi (0.18 km)	30 yd (27 m)
EFU	A brief tornado was observed by a trained spotter causing no damage.						

=== August 27 event ===
List of confirmed tornadoes – Friday, August 27, 2021
EF#	Location	County / Parish	State	Start Coord.	Time (UTC)	Path length	Max width
EF0	SW of Clear Lake	Cerro Gordo	IA	43.0639°N 93.4134°W	22:06–22:12	2.14 mi (3.44 km)	250 yd (230 m)
EF0	Crops and trees were damaged.						
EFU	NW of Dougherty	Cerro Gordo	IA	42.9474°N 93.1152°W	22:35–22:41	2.04 mi (3.28 km)	110 yd (100 m)
EFU	This tornado was confirmed using high resolution satellite imagery. No damage was found.						
EF0	ENE of Dougherty	Floyd	IA	42.9363°N 92.9972°W	22:50–22:51	1.29 mi (2.08 km)	140 yd (130 m)
EF0	This tornado was confirmed using high resolution satellite imagery. No damage was found. Based on striation patterns in fields hit by this tornado, it was likely an anticyclonic tornado.						
EF0	W of Marble Rock	Floyd	IA	42.9667°N 92.9924°W	22:51–22:54	2.19 mi (3.52 km)	90 yd (82 m)
EF0	One farm outbuilding had part of its roof torn off. Crops were damaged.						
EF1	Marble Rock to NNW of Greene	Floyd	IA	42.9635°N 92.8968°W	22:57–23:11	6.38 mi (10.27 km)	300 yd (270 m)
EF1	Several farms and buildings were damaged; one farm had nearly all its outbuildings destroyed. Several large propane tanks were overturned. Trees and crops were damaged.						

=== August 28 event ===
List of confirmed tornadoes – Saturday, August 28, 2021
EF#	Location	County / Parish	State	Start Coord.	Time (UTC)	Path length	Max width
EF0	S of Albany	Stearns	MN	45.5726°N 94.5994°W	16:26–16:28	2.07 mi (3.33 km)	25 yd (23 m)
EF0	About two dozen trees were damaged.						
EF1	Lennox	Turner, Lincoln	SD	43.342°N 96.933°W	21:22–21:25	2.7 mi (4.3 km)	150 yd (140 m)
EF1	An outbuilding was destroyed, structures in town sustained roof damage, and trees were uprooted or snapped. One tree fell on and damaged a barn, and the upturned roots of another tree damaged the porch of a house. A trampoline was thrown into a treetop and mangled.						
EFU	E of Lennox	Lincoln	SD	43.352°N 96.862°W	21:25–21:26	0.9 mi (1.4 km)	20 yd (18 m)
EFU	This brief tornado was confirmed based on Sentinel-2 satellite imagery. No damage was found.						
EFU	N of Worthing	Lincoln	SD	43.362°N 96.783°W	21:30–21:32	1.6 mi (2.6 km)	20 yd (18 m)
EFU	This brief tornado was confirmed based on Sentinel-2 satellite imagery. No damage was found.						
EFU	NE of Worthing	Lincoln	SD	43.365°N 96.707°W	21:35–21:36	1.1 mi (1.8 km)	30 yd (27 m)
EFU	This brief tornado was confirmed based on Sentinel-2 satellite imagery. No damage was found.						
EFU	WNW of Iona	Murray	MN	43.936°N 95.863°W	22:29–22:31	1.18 mi (1.90 km)	40 yd (37 m)
EFU	This brief tornado was confirmed based on Sentinel-2 satellite imagery. No damage was found.						
EFU	N of Avoca	Murray	MN	43.992°N 95.627°W	22:40–22:43	1.91 mi (3.07 km)	20 yd (18 m)
EFU	This brief tornado was confirmed based on Sentinel-2 satellite imagery. No damage was found.						
EFU	SW of Dovray	Murray	MN	44.044°N 95.561°W	22:48–22:49	0.64 mi (1.03 km)	20 yd (18 m)
EFU	This brief tornado was confirmed based on Sentinel-2 satellite imagery. No damage was found.						
EFU	NE of Dovray	Murray	MN	44.062°N 95.475°W	22:53–22:56	2.21 mi (3.56 km)	20 yd (18 m)
EFU	This brief tornado was confirmed based on Sentinel-2 satellite imagery. No damage was found.						
EFU	SW of Sanborn	Cottonwood	MN	44.125°N 95.22°W	23:04–23:12	3.54 mi (5.70 km)	20 yd (18 m)
EFU	This brief tornado was confirmed based on Sentinel-2 satellite imagery. No damage was found.						
EF0	SW of Cobden	Brown	MN	44.2441°N 94.8627°W	23:29–23:35	3.29 mi (5.29 km)	20 yd (18 m)
EF0	This brief tornado was confirmed based on Sentinel-2 satellite imagery. Large tree branches were downed.						
EF0	SE of Cobden	Brown	MN	44.226°N 94.8068°W	23:29–23:37	4.29 mi (6.90 km)	25 yd (23 m)
EF0	This brief tornado was confirmed based on Sentinel-2 satellite imagery. Large tree branches were downed.						
EF0	SW of Essig	Brown	MN	44.3038°N 94.641°W	23:47–23:49	0.94 mi (1.51 km)	25 yd (23 m)
EF0	This brief tornado was confirmed based on Sentinel-2 satellite imagery. Large tree branches were downed.						
EFU	N of Essig	Brown	MN	44.3473°N 94.5857°W	23:52–23:53	0.63 mi (1.01 km)	20 yd (18 m)
EFU	This brief tornado was confirmed based on Sentinel-2 satellite imagery. No damage was found.						
EF0	WSW of New Richland	Waseca	MN	43.8756°N 93.5422°W	01:12–01:13	0.68 mi (1.09 km)	25 yd (23 m)
EF0	Large large tree branches were snapped, plywood was blown into a field, and corn was damaged.						
EF0	SW of New Richland	Waseca	MN	43.8758°N 93.5136°W	01:14–01:15	0.44 mi (0.71 km)	25 yd (23 m)
EF0	Large tree branches were snapped at a farmstead.						

=== August 29 event ===
List of confirmed tornadoes – Sunday, August 29, 2021
EF#	Location	County / parish	State	Start coord.	Time (UTC)	Path length	Max. width	Summary
EF1	WSW of Pass Christian to SW of Diamondhead	Harrison, Hancock	MS	30.3156°N 89.2582°W	11:23–11:28	3.8 mi (6.1 km)	150 yd (140 m)	A waterspout moved onshore from the Gulf of Mexico damaging several homes, with one sustaining extensive roof damage. It continued to damage homes as it tracked northwest into the Bay of St. Louis. The tornado tracked near Diamondhead as it moved onshore from the bay. Shingles were removed from the roof of a nursing center as the tornado crossed I-10 before dissipating shortly thereafter. Trees were snapped or uprooted along the path as well.
EF0	Gulfport	Harrison	MS	30.3777°N 89.0646°W	22:15–22:19	0.74 mi (1.19 km)	50 yd (46 m)	Numerous trees and tree limbs were downed, including one large tree that was uprooted onto two houses. A house, a strip mall, and another building sustained roof damage as well.
EF1	Eden Isle (1st tornado)	St. Tammany	LA	30.2112°N 89.7729°W	23:33–23:38	4.92 mi (7.92 km)	175 yd (160 m)	Two buildings at a condominium complex had their roofs partially torn off. Numerous houses were damaged and trees were downed.
EF0	SE to NW of Pearlington	Hancock	MS	30.2061°N 89.5074°W	23:59–00:09	10.55 mi (16.98 km)	75 yd (69 m)	A waterspout moved onshore, blowing down road signs and posts. Trees and roofs of homes were damaged.
EF0	Eden Isle (2nd tornado)	St. Tammany	LA	30.2197°N 89.7942°W	01:56–01:57	0.88 mi (1.42 km)	100 yd (91 m)	A brief tornado damage roofs and fences and uprooted trees.
EF0	ESE of Waveland to Shoreline Park	Hancock	MS	30.2664°N 89.3864°W	03:11–03:14	3.34 mi (5.38 km)	200 yd (180 m)	A waterspout moved onshore and caused minor damage to the roofs of several homes and an apartment complex. Several trees were also snapped or uprooted.
EF0	NE of Waveland to NE of Shoreline Park	Hancock	MS	30.2955°N 89.3658°W	03:15–03:18	2.88 mi (4.63 km)	200 yd (180 m)	A waterspout moved onshore, where the roofs of several homes sustained minor damage. Several trees were snapped or uprooted as well.
EF0	Henderson Point	Harrison	MS	30.3081°N 89.2822°W	03:37–03:38	0.51 mi (0.82 km)	75 yd (69 m)	A waterspout formed over the Mississippi Sound and moved inland. Several homes and a detached garage were damaged, trees were snapped or uprooted, and power lines were snapped.

=== August 30 event ===
List of confirmed tornadoes – Monday, August 30, 2021
EF#	Location	County / parish	State	Start coord.	Time (UTC)	Path length	Max. width	Summary
EF0	Biloxi (1st tornado)	Harrison	MS	30.3973°N 88.9332°W	09:18–09:19	0.17 mi (0.27 km)	150 yd (140 m)	A very brief tornado caused minor damage to several homes and several apartment buildings.
EF0	Biloxi (2nd tornado)	Harrison	MS	30.3966°N 88.8788°W	10:55–10:56	0.53 mi (0.85 km)	100 yd (91 m)	A brief tornado inflicted minor damage to several homes and a small office complex. Large tree limbs were snapped.
EF0	NW of Mississippi City	Harrison	MS	30.3868°N 89.0565°W	12:44–12:45	0.52 mi (0.84 km)	100 yd (91 m)	A brief tornado damaged the roofs of several homes and snapped numerous trees.
EF0	E of Gulfport to WSW of Biloxi	Harrison	MS	30.391°N 89.0061°W	12:49–12:51	1.04 mi (1.67 km)	200 yd (180 m)	Trees were snapped and uprooted at a golf club. Several homes sustained damage, and a warehouse lost some of its roof panels.
EF0	Biloxi (3rd tornado)	Harrison	MS	30.3971°N 88.9928°W	12:50–12:55	3.47 mi (5.58 km)	125 yd (114 m)	Trees were downed and several houses sustained roof damage. The tornado crossed Big Lake and caused minor damage more homes.
EF0	Biloxi (4th tornado)	Harrison	MS	30.3974°N 88.9737°W	12:56–12:58	1.05 mi (1.69 km)	150 yd (140 m)	Several homes sustained minor roof damage. Portions of roofing were torn off at a bank and a restaurant, and trees and fences were damaged along the tornado's path.
EF0	Pascagoula to SE of Helena	Jackson	MS	30.3499°N 88.5583°W	14:37–14:57	10.19 mi (16.40 km)	50 yd (46 m)	A waterspout moved ashore, causing light damage to multiple homes. Tree limbs were damaged.
EF1	Saraland to E of Bucks	Mobile, Baldwin	AL	30.7951°N 88.0731°W	17:20–17:43	16.62 mi (26.75 km)	175 yd (160 m)	The roof of a motel was partially removed just west of US 43 in Saraland, and several sections of another motel's roof were removed. The roof of an industrial building was partially removed and an 18-wheeler was overturned. Trees were uprooted or snapped along the path, including some that fell onto a home near I-65. Three people were injured. In November 2023, this tornado was reanalyzed and had its path length adjusted from 9.96 mi (16.03 km) to 16.62 mi (26.75 km) due to a narrow swath of uprooted and snapped trees noted on Planet and Worldview satellite imagery. The ending point was also extended further to the northeast into the Mobile River delta.
EF1	E of Malcolm	Clarke, Baldwin	AL	31.21°N 87.86°W	18:05–18:10	3.53 mi (5.68 km)	175 yd (160 m)	In November 2023, a new tornado was found along the Alabama River based on a narrow swath of tree damage noted on Planet and Worldview satellite imagery.
EF1	ESE of Rockville to WSW of Alma	Clarke	AL	31.4064°N 87.7922°W	18:25–18:28	3.5 mi (5.6 km)	150 yd (140 m)	A mobile home was rolled and another home lost much of its roof. Trees were snapped or uprooted as the tornado tracked through a heavily wooded area.
EF0	SE of Troy	Pike	AL	31.7266°N 85.9109°W	19:02–19:09	3.18 mi (5.12 km)	75 yd (69 m)	A few trees were downed or had limbs snapped off.
EF0	SE of Tuskegee	Macon	AL	32.3979°N 85.5981°W	20:45–20:46	0.48 mi (0.77 km)	75 yd (69 m)	Trees and tree limbs were blown down, and a home sustained siding damage.

=== August 31 event ===
List of confirmed tornadoes – Tuesday, August 31, 2021
EF#	Location	County / parish	State	Start coord.	Time (UTC)	Path length	Max. width	Summary
EF0	SW of Peterman to Jones Crossroads	Houston	AL	31.1999°N 85.4894°W	20:59–21:08	0.89 mi (1.43 km)	20 yd (18 m)	Trees were downed onto a mobile home. Farther along the path, the doors and siding of a warehouse were damaged and the roof of a shed was peeled off.
EF1	SE of Radford	Montgomery	VA	37.0808°N 80.5188°W	22:34–22:38	1.9 mi (3.1 km)	75 yd (69 m)	A barn was damaged and several trees were snapped or uprooted.
EF1	NW of Merrimac	Montgomery	VA	37.1974°N 80.4376°W	22:59–23:00	0.22 mi (0.35 km)	75 yd (69 m)	Several trees were uprooted and snapped, and a swing was destroyed.
EF0	Midland City	Dale	AL	31.3194°N 85.5045°W	23:14–23:17	0.65 mi (1.05 km)	125 yd (114 m)	Bleachers and a dugout at the Dale City High School were damaged. Numerous homes in Midland City sustained minor roof damage, and trampolines were lofted into the air. Several trees were also blown down, some of which fell onto and damaged a home.
EF0	N of Bailey Crossroad	Geneva, Houston	AL	31.1884°N 85.614°W	23:34–23:40	2.29 mi (3.69 km)	25 yd (23 m)	This tornado moved through open fields before damaging a barn near the end of its path.

== September ==
Confirmed tornadoes by Enhanced Fujita rating
EFU	EF0	EF1	EF2	EF3	EF4	EF5	Total
1	15	9	3	1	0	0	29

=== September 1 event ===
List of confirmed tornadoes – Wednesday, September 1, 2021
EF#	Location	County / parish	State	Start coord.	Time (UTC)	Path length	Max. width	Summary
EF2	Owensville to western Annapolis	Anne Arundel	MD	38.85°N 76.596°W	18:01–18:23	11.43 mi (18.39 km)	200 yd (180 m)	This damaging tornado first touched down in Owensville before moving north-northeastward, downing trees and tree branches. As it entered the south side of Edgewater, it strengthened and struck a subdivision, where multiple homes had large sections of their roofs torn off, and one was unroofed entirely. The Center of Applied Technology South and South River High School both sustained roof damage, while the concession stand and football field grandstands were also damaged. Many homes suffered considerable roof, siding, and porch damage as the tornado moved farther north-northeast through residential areas. After crossing the South River, the tornado reached peak strength and struck several neighborhoods in Annapolis. Numerous homes, apartment buildings, businesses, warehouses, and restaurants had their roofs ripped off or sustained significant roof and siding damage, including a warehouse that sustained some collapse of exterior walls. Numerous windows were also shattered, signs were destroyed, and many power lines and trees were downed, some of which landed on homes. The tornado weakened and caused additional tree and roof damage as it approached US 301/US 50 before lifting just after crossing it.
EF0	E of Edgemere	Baltimore	MD	39.197°N 76.442°W	18:48–19:00	6.73 mi (10.83 km)	75 yd (69 m)	A high-end EF0 tornado developed at the confluence of the Patapsco River and Chesapeake Bay and moved north-northeastward, crossing the Shallow Creek, Back River, and Browns Creek. Trees and branches were snapped along the path before it dissipated near the Middle River.
EF2	Eastern Oxford to NE of Russellville	Chester	PA	39.77°N 75.97°W	20:15–20:22	5.92 mi (9.53 km)	350 yd (320 m)	This low-end EF2 tornado first caused significant damage in the Wiltshire subdivision at the east edge of Oxford. A home lost an exterior wall, another home lost a large part of its roof and much of its siding, and several other homes were damaged to a lesser degree. An outbuilding was damaged and an RV was flipped at a business near the subdivision as well. The tornado weakened as it continued to the north, damaging a metal storage building, turkey pens, outbuildings, power poles, trees, and crops before dissipating. Damage totaled $500,000.
EF0	W of Hurlock	Dorchester	MD	38.67°N 75.86°W	20:45–20:58	3.82 mi (6.15 km)	50 yd (46 m)	A 40 ft (12 m) section of roofing was torn off of a metal building. Several large irrigation systems were flipped, and damage to soybean and corn crops also occurred.
EF2	Fort Washington to Horsham	Montgomery	PA	40.107°N 75.238°W	21:35–21:49	8.28 mi (13.33 km)	400 yd (370 m)	1 death – This rain-wrapped, strong tornado touched down near the Philadelphia Cricket Club southwest of Whitemarsh, where minor low-end EF1 tree damage occurred. Additional minor damage occurred to homes and trees in and around Fort Washington State Park. The tornado strengthened to high-end EF1 intensity as it moved through Whitemarsh, crossed the Pennsylvania Turnpike, and moved into a more residential area as it entered Fort Washington, where many trees were snapped, and numerous homes sustained minor to moderate roof and siding damage. The tornado then rapidly intensified and reached its peak intensity of high-end EF2 as it crossed PA 309 in Upper Dublin. Numerous homes and apartment buildings sustained partial to total loss of their roofs, and one sustained collapse of some exterior walls. Almost all trees in this area were uprooted or snapped, and cars were flipped or damaged by flying debris. Upper Dublin High School sustained roof damage, a large building adjacent to the school lost a significant portion of its roof, and power poles were snapped. Homes near the school were damaged, and one woman was killed when a large tree fell onto her house on Kenyon Drive. The tornado weakened to high-end EF1 strength as it continued to move to the northeast, flattening a wide swath of trees in a wooded area and causing severe roof damage to buildings on the campus of Temple University Ambler. Homes were damaged in a nearby neighborhood as well, a few of which also had large sections of roofing torn off. Many additional trees were downed, and mostly minor roof damage to homes, commercial buildings, and a veterinary hospital occurred in Maple Glen before the tornado quickly dissipated near the Bucks County line. Damage totaled $5 million and two people were injured.
EF1	S of Doylestown to Buckingham Township	Bucks	PA	40.27°N 75.11°W	21:59–22:06	4.31 mi (6.94 km)	300 yd (270 m)	This tornado came from the same storm that produced the previous tornado above. It moved through a forested area, damaging and knocking down trees, some of which blocked roads.
EF3	E of Harrisonville to Mullica Hill to Deptford	Gloucester	NJ	39.6769°N 75.2500°W	22:10–22:30	12.37 mi (19.91 km)	400 yd (370 m)	See section for this tornado – Two people were injured.
EF1	Upper Makefield Township	Bucks	PA	40.298°N 74.938°W	22:30–22:35	1.6 mi (2.6 km)	250 yd (230 m)	Some trees were uprooted at the Jericho National Golf Club. Additional tree damage was found along with several flipped soccer goals at Brownsburg Park. The tornado dissipated just before crossing the Delaware River.
EF1	Edgewater Park, NJ to Bristol, PA	Burlington (NJ), Bucks (PA)	NJ, PA	40.06°N 74.89°W	22:59–23:04	2.98 mi (4.80 km)	200 yd (180 m)	This tornado came from the same storm that produced the Mullica Hill EF3 tornado. Trees and power lines were damaged along the path and a few homes sustained minor damage. Several pictures and videos were taken, particularly as the tornado crossed the Delaware River between Burlington and Bristol. A tornado emergency was issued for this tornado, the first of its kind to be issued in the Northeast.
EF0	Princeton	Mercer	NJ	40.31°N 74.67°W	23:32–23:35	2.61 mi (4.20 km)	100 yd (91 m)	This tornado was the last produced by the Mullica Hill supercell. Trees and branches were snapped and uprooted in town, but no structural damage occurred.

=== September 2 event ===
Event in Massachusetts was associated with Hurricane Ida.

List of confirmed tornadoes – Thursday, September 2, 2021
EF#	Location	County / Parish	State	Start Coord.	Time (UTC)	Path length	Max width
EF0	Dennis	Barnstable	MA	41.7413°N 70.2135°W	05:30–05:31	0.1 mi (0.16 km)	15 yd (14 m)
EF0	A weak tornado caused minor damage to two homes in town, and knocked down three large oak trees.						
EF1	NW of North Salt Lake to Woods Cross	Davis	UT	40.8575°N 111.9304°W	00:28–00:34	2.05 mi (3.30 km)	350 yd (320 m)
EF1	Several homes and businesses sustained minor to moderate damage along the path. A power pole was found leaning, while trees were uprooted and tree limbs were snapped.						

=== September 7 event ===
List of confirmed tornadoes – Tuesday, September 7, 2021
EF#	Location	County / Parish	State	Start Coord.	Time (UTC)	Path length	Max width
EF1	N of Lake Wilson to W of Osseo	Hillsdale	MI	41.8982°N 84.6931°W	23:45–23:51	5.33 mi (8.58 km)	450 yd (410 m)
EF1	Several outbuildings and a silo were destroyed, power poles were snapped, and two 1,000-pound (450 kg) hay bales were tossed. Significant tree damage occurred.						

=== September 8 event ===
Event in Florida was associated with Tropical Storm Mindy.

List of confirmed tornadoes – Wednesday, September 8, 2021
EF#	Location	County / Parish	State	Start Coord.	Time (UTC)	Path length	Max width
EF1	SE of Middleburg	Snyder	PA	40.7586°N 77.0062°W	21:32–21:33	0.73 mi (1.17 km)	30 yd (27 m)
EF1	Power lines and more than 100 trees were knocked down.						
EF0	ESE of Freeburg	Snyder	PA	40.7529°N 76.9131°W	21:35–21:36	1.45 mi (2.33 km)	30 yd (27 m)
EF0	A barn roof was damaged, trees were snapped and uprooted, and corn was flattened.						
EF0	W of Crawfordville	Wakulla	FL	30.1599°N 84.4497°W	01:08–01:13	1.45 mi (2.33 km)	50 yd (46 m)
EF0	Tree damage occurred.						

=== September 9 event ===
List of confirmed tornadoes – Thursday, September 9, 2021
EF#	Location	County / Parish	State	Start Coord.	Time (UTC)	Path length	Max width
EF0	Coventry	Tolland	CT	41.750°N 72.299°W	08:10–08:11	0.75 mi (1.21 km)	75 yd (69 m)
EF0	A short-lived, intermittent tornado downed over a dozen trees and damaged many other, some of which had their tops sheared off. Power lines were damaged as well.						
EF0	SSE of Lake Los Angeles	Los Angeles	CA	34.5203°N 117.7595°W	23:58–00:15	1.79 mi (2.88 km)	9 yd (8.2 m)
EF0	A weather spotter reported a weak landspout tornado with no damage.						

=== September 13 event ===
List of confirmed tornadoes – Monday, September 13, 2021
EF#	Location	County / Parish	State	Start Coord.	Time (UTC)	Path length	Max width
EF1	Conesus to Springwater	Livingston	NY	42.67°N 77.64°W	04:57–05:00	0.8 mi (1.3 km)	75 yd (69 m)
EF1	This tornado caused minor siding damage to a mobile home, and moved a boat and an antique plow. High-end EF1 damage occurred in a wooded area, with numerous trees snapped or uprooted. A shed and above-ground swimming pool were crushed by falling trees as well.						

=== September 15 event ===
List of confirmed tornadoes – Wednesday, September 15, 2021
EF#	Location	County / Parish	State	Start Coord.	Time (UTC)	Path length	Max width
EFU	SE of Poydras	St. Bernard	LA	29.82°N 89.82°W	09:07–09:12	1.86 mi (2.99 km)	
EFU	A tornadic waterspout of unknown intensity came ashore on the northern side of Lake Lery causing a broad swath of damage to marshland visible from high-resolution satellite imagery.						

=== September 17 event ===
List of confirmed tornadoes – Friday, September 17, 2021
EF#	Location	County / Parish	State	Start Coord.	Time (UTC)	Path length	Max width
EF0	NNW of Le Sueur	Sibley	MN	44.4824°N 93.952°W	07:34–07:35	1.59 mi (2.56 km)	50 yd (46 m)
EF0	The tornado moved through a corn field and struck a grove of trees, where several large branches were downed.						
EF0	W of Savage	Scott	MN	44.7507°N 93.383°W	08:00–08:03	2.1 mi (3.4 km)	200 yd (180 m)
EF0	Damage mainly consisted of trees falling on homes and vehicles. A public works building sustained roof damage and a light standard was bent.						
EF0	N of Apple Valley	Dakota	MN	44.7906°N 93.2434°W	08:08–08:09	1.02 mi (1.64 km)	50 yd (46 m)
EF0	Damage mainly consisted of trees falling on homes and vehicles.						
EF0	NE of Burnsville	Dakota	MN	44.7388°N 93.2146°W	08:08–08:09	0.81 mi (1.30 km)	75 yd (69 m)
EF0	Damage mainly consisted of trees falling on homes and vehicles.						

=== September 18 event ===
List of confirmed tornadoes – Saturday, September 18, 2021
EF#	Location	County / Parish	State	Start Coord.	Time (UTC)	Path length	Max width
EF0	NW of Citra	Alachua	FL	29.43°N 82.12°W	22:24–22:34	0.1 mi (0.16 km)	20 yd (18 m)
EF0	A waterspout formed and dissipated over Orange Lake. No damage occurred.						

=== September 20 event ===
List of confirmed tornadoes – Monday, September 20, 2021
EF#	Location	County / Parish	State	Start Coord.	Time (UTC)	Path length	Max width
EF0	NE of Eyota	Olmsted	MN	44.0331°N 92.2261°W	21:47–21:56	5.66 mi (9.11 km)	100 yd (91 m)
EF0	A short-lived QLCS tornado damaged outbuildings and equipment on two farms.						
EF1	N of Independence to SE of Strum	Trempealeau	WI	44.423°N 91.4507°W	22:56–23:11	8.49 mi (13.66 km)	100 yd (91 m)
EF1	Nine structures were damaged or destroyed by this tornado, and a semi truck was rolled, injuring the driver. Sporadic tree and crop damage occurred.						

=== September 22 event ===
List of confirmed tornadoes – Wednesday, September 22, 2021
EF#	Location	County / Parish	State	Start Coord.	Time (UTC)	Path length	Max width
EF1	N of Stoneboro	Mercer	PA	41.3625°N 80.1151°W	22:20–22:21	0.26 mi (0.42 km)	90 yd (82 m)
EF1	Trees were uprooted and corn in a field was damaged. Nearby structures sustained damage from straight-line winds.						

=== September 27 event ===
List of confirmed tornadoes – Monday, September 27, 2021
EF#	Location	County / Parish	State	Start Coord.	Time (UTC)	Path length	Max width
EF0	W of Battle Ground to Lewisville	Clark	WA	45.7804°N 122.5982°W	02:06–02:21	3.9 mi (6.3 km)	240 yd (220 m)
EF0	Trees were snapped or uprooted. A tree fell onto an RV, and some falling trees damaged fences.						

== See also ==
- Tornadoes of 2021
- List of United States tornadoes from April to June 2021
- List of United States tornadoes from October to November 2021
