= Newmansville =

Newmansville may refer to two places in the United States:

- Newmansville, Illinois
- Newmansville Township, Cass County, Illinois
