= 2021 Boscobel tornado =

2021 tornado in Wisconsin, U.S.

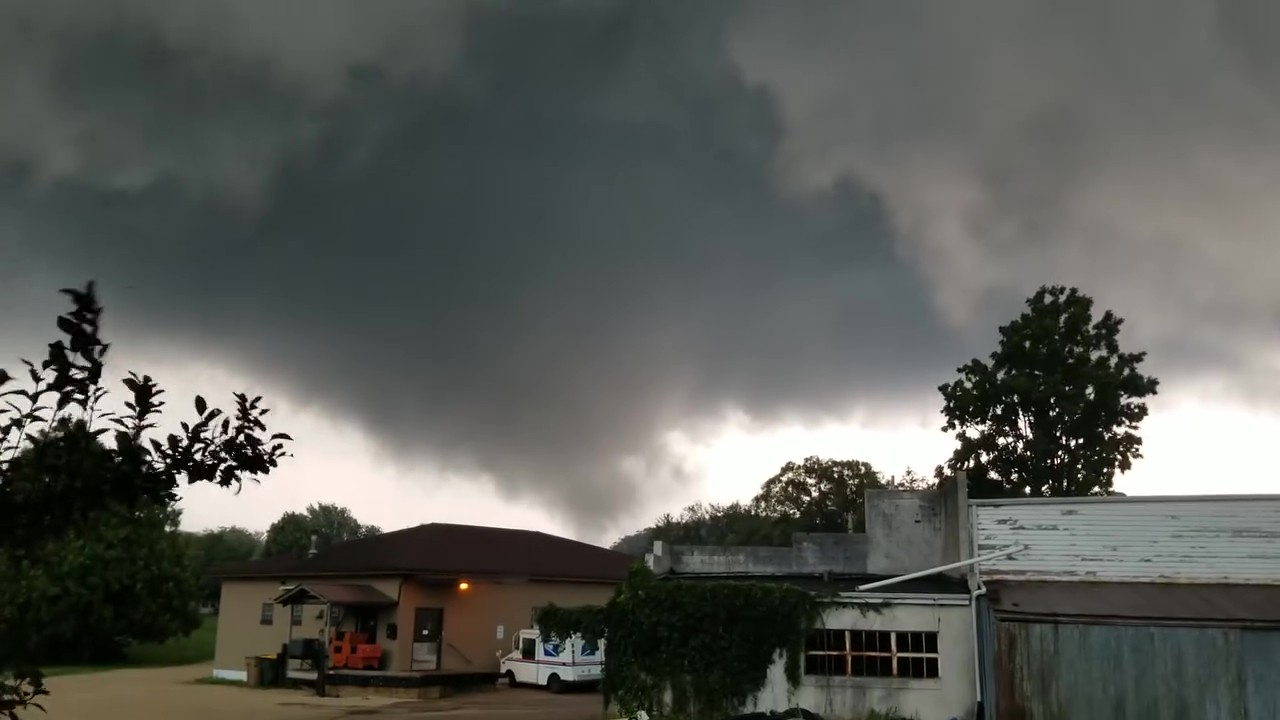
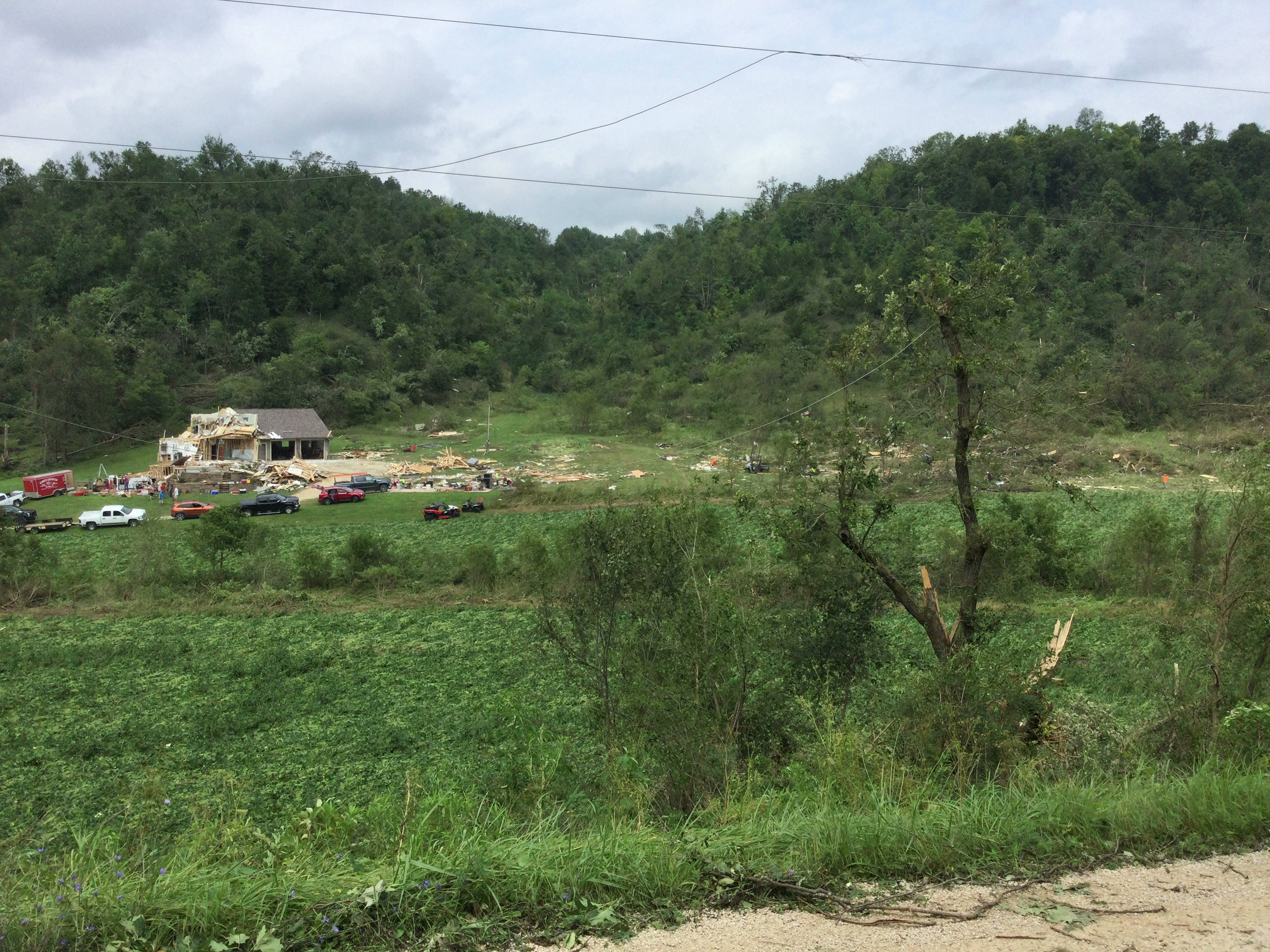
- Clockwise from Top: The tornado seen shortly after its formation within Boscobel, NEXRAD scan of the tornado at 3:43 p.m. east of Boscobel, high-end EF3 damage to a property southeast of Boscobel

Meteorological history
- Formed: August 7, 2021, 4:29 p.m. CDT (UTC−05:00)
- Dissipated: August 7, 2021, 4:56 p.m. CDT (UTC−05:00)
- Duration: 27 minutes

EF3 tornado
- on the Enhanced Fujita scale
- Max width: 1,100 yards (0.63 mi; 1.0 km)
- Path length: 10.62 miles (17.09 km)
- Highest winds: 160 mph (260 km/h)

Overall effects
- Fatalities: 0
- Injuries: 0
- Damage: $455,000 (2021 USD)
- Areas affected: Grant County, Wisconsin
- Part of the Tornadoes of 2021

During the afternoon hours of August 7, 2021, a large and intense rain-wrapped tornado passed over areas south of Boscobel, a city located in the U.S. state of Wisconsin. The tornado, which was on the ground for 27 minutes and for a total of 10.62 miles (17.09 km), reached maximum estimated wind speeds of 160 miles per hour (260 km/h), as it moved across portions of Grant County, making it the strongest tornado to occur in Wisconsin since 2008. The tornado was given a rating of an EF3 on the Enhanced Fujita scale due to severe damage at one property.

The tornado first touched down at 4:29 p.m. (Note: For consistency, all times in the article are listed in Central Daylight Time.) in the southwest portions of Boscobel, inflicting minor damage to trees and structures as it moved to the west. The tornado intensified after moving out of the city, snapping hardwood trees and causing wide swaths of damage. Along Kiwanis Road the tornado reached its peak intensity, heavily damaging a property with winds in the high-end EF3 range. One property was described by National Weather Service (NWS) surveyors as "pushing EF4", although poor connections in the home's structure led surveyors to rate it EF3. It then began to occlude, turning sharply south as it weakened before lifting at 4:56 p.m. in rural Grant County. The tornado's maximum estimated width was 1,100 yards (0.63 mi; 1,000 m), one of the widest in the state since 2005.

== Advanced forecasting ==
The Day 3 convective outlook, outlined by the Storm Prediction Center (SPC) on August 5, highlighted an elevated chance of severe weather across a large portion of the Upper Midwest. The outlook noted that "sporadic severe reports of wind, hail, and perhaps a brief/weak tornado will all be possible" across the Northern Plains and the Upper Mississippi River Valley. A "slight", level 2-out-of-5 risk accompanied a 15% chance of severe weather across these regions for the duration of the Day 3 outlook.

The Day 2 convective outlook maintained a slight risk region across similar areas as the day before, with a large 2% tornado risk being highlighted across much of the Upper Midwest. The Day 1 outlook featured a slight risk area across much of South Dakota and portions of northern Nebraska; a later update expanded the slight risk region into Wisconsin. Additionally, a 5% risk of tornadoes was outlined for parts of Wisconsin, Minnesota, and Iowa.

The supercell that produced the Boscobel tornado initiated to the east of Prairie du Chien along a warm front that was extant across southwest portions of Wisconsin. Due to high atmospheric instability and wind shear favorable for the development of supercells, the storm rapidly matured. At 4:19 p.m. a tornado warning was issued that included Boscobel; shortly after the tornado first began causing damage. Strong upper-level difluence was visible by the GOES-16 satellite within the supercell for the majority of the tornado's life.

== Tornado summary ==
The tornado touched down west of Borden Road at 4:29 p.m., where it began to snap branches. As it continued west, the tornado passed over the Wisconsin Western Railroad. Trees were uprooted by the tornado near Wisconsin Highway 133. It then curved west onto Wisconsin Avenue and U.S. Route 61, inflicting minor damage to a building and EF1-rated damage to crops within a narrow swath. In southern Boscobel, the city's sign was partially ripped off. Continuing at EF1 intensity, the tornado began to widen, with trees being snapped near Chestnut Street. Nearby, the tornado moved over the Boscobel Cemetery before entering the Sanders Creek area, where it widened to 700–1,000 yards (0.40–0.57 mi; 640–910 m) and inflicted EF0–EF1 damage to trees. As the tornado moved near and over County Road MS, it inflicted low-end EF2 damage to a home; surveyors noted that the residence had poor wall connections and that the damage at this location was possibly of high-end EF1 intensity. A short distance to the north a home suffered minor damage. The tornado turned further east as it approached County Road M, where hardwood trees were snapped. It continued to move over forested areas as it tracked to the northeast, before striking a property near Kiwanis Road.

Multiple homes on the property were largely destroyed, with debris from one home being pushed 100 yards (91 m) or more to the north and northeast. Damage to one home was described by NWS surveyors as "pushing EF4". However, tree damage nearby supported a rating of high-end EF3, with maximum winds at this location being 160 miles per hour (260 km/h). Winds in the area were influenced by the valley which the property lied in, as well as a narrow jet of wind that ran parallel to the floor of the valley. By this point along the tornado's path, a tornado debris signature was visible on the NEXRAD radar positioned in La Crosse. An occlusion process, where a tornado starts to weaken and deviate from its path, began shortly after the tornado passed over County Road T, where EF2 damage was inflicted to a home. To the southwest a property on Johnson Road was impacted by the southern edge of the tornado, with outbuildings being destroyed.

Damage to a residence in rural Grant County

It sharply turned south after passing over County Road T, maintaining a swath of EF2 intensity over Larson Lane and producing a large swath of tree damage near County Road M. It moved almost straight to the south while weakening and becoming thinner, with the last area of significant damage being noted north of Sand Hill Road. Tree trunks were also snapped as the tornado crossed over the road, with an additional convergence pattern being observed in a swath of corn. It turned slightly east while approaching, and ultimately passing north of, Zinck Road. At 4:56 p.m., shortly after crossing Neff Road, the tornado lifted. Two large regions of strong inflow, with winds reaching up to 90 miles per hour (140 km/h), existing to the north and south of the tornado for a large duration of its track. These inflow regions resulted in sporadic tree and structure damage.

The tornado was on the ground for 27 minutes, reaching a maximum width of 1,100 yards (0.63 mi; 1,000 m), with the combined inflow and tornadic damage swath reaching upwards of 1.5 miles (2.4 km) in width. The total path length was estimated at 10.62 miles (17.09 km). Due to the low cloud base of the parent supercell, rugged nature of the region and the tornado being wrapped by rain, only a small amount of videos exist of the tornado.

In addition to the tornado, thunderstorms produced flooding as a result of excessive rainfall across parts of Minnesota and Central Wisconsin.

== Aftermath ==
Preliminary assessments by local fire department crews estimated that six homes were completely destroyed, with five more having major damage. 10 homes were estimated to have had minor damage and 23 outbuildings were affected. Total monetary damage was estimated at $455,000 (2021 USD) (Note: Unless noted otherwise, all monetary totals in the article are in 2021-adjusted United States dollars.), with $430,000 being a result of structural damage and an additional $25,000 being caused by crop-related damage. No injuries or fatalities were reported as a result of the event. The tornado was initially rated EF3 on the Enhanced Fujita scale by the National Weather Service, with maximum estimated wind speeds of 150 miles per hour (240 km/h). However, on August 8, the National Weather Service upgraded its estimate of the tornado's maximum wind speeds to 160 miles per hour (260 km/h), making it the strongest tornado in Wisconsin history since 2008, when a tornado impacted Kenosha County. Additionally, the tornado was the widest in the state of Wisconsin since 2005, when an F3 tornado passed over Dane County.

=== Recovery efforts ===
A barn built in 1910 was completely destroyed by the tornado; it was rebuilt following the event. The owner stated in regards to cleanup efforts that “it was marvelous, and you know when you see people shooting today and have no regard for other people’s lives or anything, see what a great community we have that they came and supported and helped in every way they could”. Heather Puckett, director of recreation in Boscobel, remarked that "as we move stuff, you find more stuff so everything kind of compiles as you go. You think you're making headway and then you find more stuff buried in the rubble that needs to be moved". The American Red Cross helped six families with storage and counseling following the tornado. The city of Boscobel raised an estimated $27,000 (2022 USD) to aid in rebuilding efforts.

Impacts from the tornado were still evident two years after the event, with piles of wood being littered around areas south of the city.

== Other tornadoes ==
Two other tornadoes were confirmed on August 7, one to the east of the Boscobel tornado in Iowa County, Wisconsin near Highland, and one in Virginia:

List of confirmed tornadoes – Saturday, August 7, 2021 (Note: All dates are based on the local time zone where the tornado touched down; however, all times are in Coordinated Universal Time for consistency.)
| EF# | Location | County | State | Start Coord. | Time (UTC) | Path length | Max width | Summary |
|---|---|---|---|---|---|---|---|---|
| EF0 | NW of Boykins | Southampton | VA | 36.592°N 77.227°W | 17:47–17:49 | 1.39 mi (2.24 km) | 25 yd (23 m) | A weak tornado snapped one tree, downed several small pine trees, and snapped tree limbs. |
| EF1 | N of Highland | Iowa | WI | 43.0799°N 90.3937°W | 22:09–22:24 | 7.72 mi (12.42 km) | 50 yd (46 m) | Two barns and some trees were damaged. |

== See also ==
- List of United States tornadoes from July to September 2021
- List of F3, EF3, and IF3 tornadoes (2020–present)
