= Newmansville Township, Cass County, Illinois =

Newmansville Township
- Township
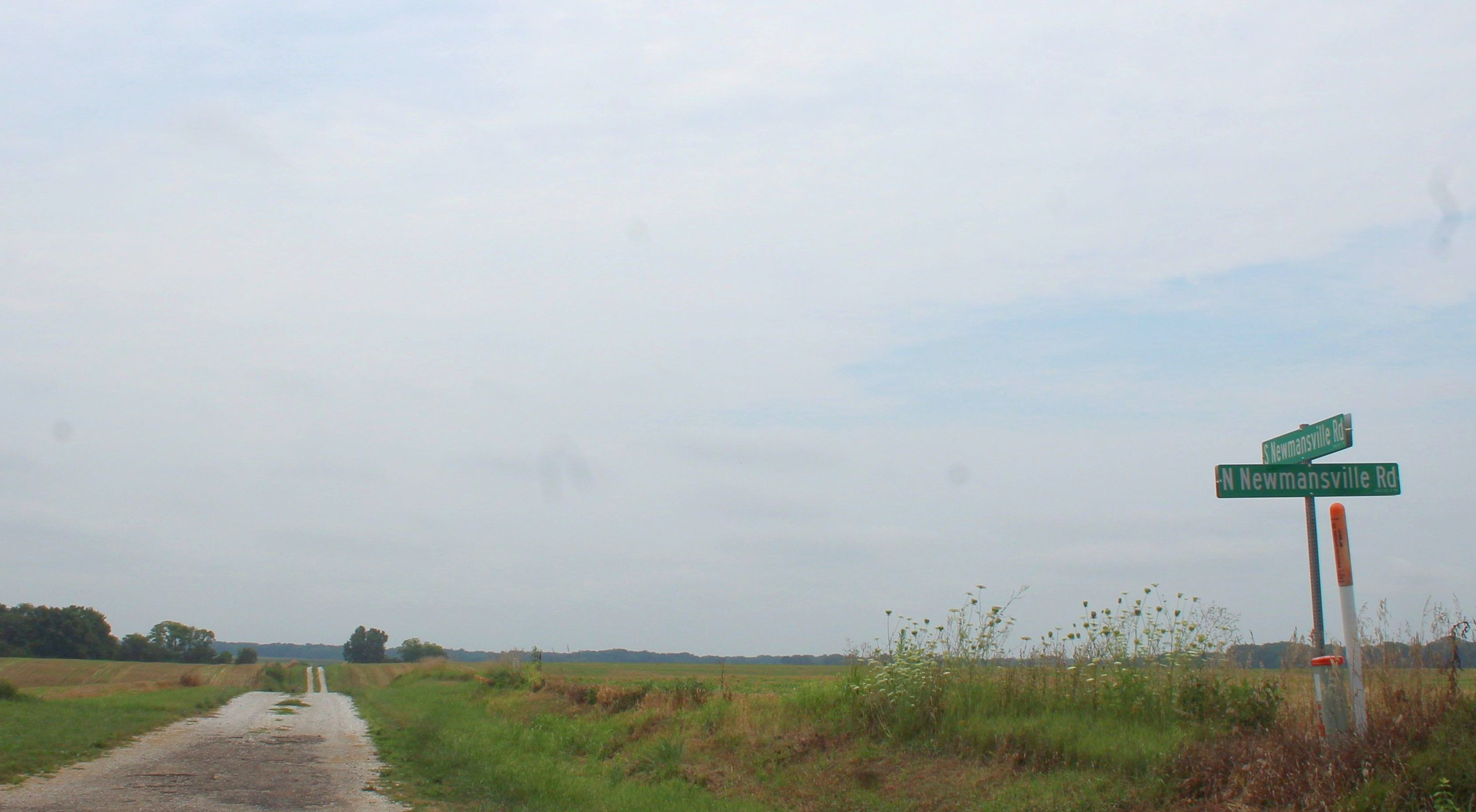
- Township road near Newmansville

- Location in Cass County

- Cass County's location in Illinois
- Coordinates: 40°00′25″N 90°01′16″W
- Country: United States
- State: Illinois
- County: Cass
- Established: November 6, 1923

Area
  - Total: 17.75 sq mi (46.0 km^{2})
  - Land: 17.75 sq mi (46.0 km^{2})
  - Water: 0 sq mi (0 km^{2}) 0%
- Elevation: 597 ft (182 m)

Population (2020)
  - Total: 68
  - Density: 3.8/sq mi (1.5/km^{2})
- Time zone: UTC-6 (CST)
  - Summer (DST): UTC-5 (CDT)
- ZIP codes: 62612, 62627, 62673, 62691
- FIPS code: 17-017-52662

Newmansville Township is one of eleven townships in Cass County, Illinois, USA. As of the 2020 census, its population was 68 and it contained 27 housing units.

== Geography ==
According to the 2010 census, the township has a total area of 17.75 square miles (46.0 km^{2}), all land.

=== Unincorporated towns ===
- Newmansville

(This list is based on USGS data and may include former settlements.)

=== Cemeteries ===
The township contains these three cemeteries: Little Shepherd, Newmansville and Witty.

== Demographics ==
Historical population
Census	Pop.	Note	%±
1930	375		—
1940	362		−3.5%
1950	253		−30.1%
1960	190		−24.9%
1970	143		−24.7%
1980	123		−14.0%
1990	64		−48.0%
2000	61		−4.7%
2010	50		−18.0%
2020	68		36.0%
U.S. Decennial Census

As of the 2020 census there were 68 people, 40 households, and 19 families residing in the township. The population density was 3.82 inhabitants per square mile (1.47/km^{2}). There were 27 housing units at an average density of 1.52 per square mile (0.59/km^{2}). The racial makeup of the township was 95.59% White, 0.00% African American, 0.00% Native American, 0.00% Asian, 0.00% Pacific Islander, 0.00% from other races, and 4.41% from two or more races. Hispanic or Latino of any race were 1.47% of the population.

There were 40 households, out of which 47.50% had children under the age of 18 living with them, 27.50% were married couples living together, 20.00% had a female householder with no spouse present, and 52.50% were non-families. 52.50% of all households were made up of individuals, and none had someone living alone who was 65 years of age or older. The average household size was 2.80 and the average family size was 4.21.

The township's age distribution consisted of 43.8% under the age of 18, 18.8% from 18 to 24, 16.9% from 25 to 44, 20.5% from 45 to 64, and 0.0% who were 65 years of age or older. The median age was 18.3 years. For every 100 females, there were 138.3 males. For every 100 females age 18 and over, there were 215.0 males.

== School districts ==
- A-C Central Community Unit School District 262
- Porta Community Unit School District 202

== Political districts ==
- Illinois' 18th congressional district
- State House District 93
- State Senate District 47
