= Rocky Mount, Georgia =

Unincorporated community in Georgia, U.S.

Coordinates: 33°09′55″N 84°40′24″W

Rocky Mount is an unincorporated community in Meriwether County, in the U.S. state of Georgia.

== History ==
The first permanent settlement at Rocky Mount was made in the 1830s. A post office called Rocky Mount was established in 1835, and remained in operation until 1909.

The Georgia General Assembly incorporated Rocky Mount as a town in 1877. The town's municipal charter was repealed in 1995.
