= Greshamville, Georgia =

Unincorporated community in Georgia, U.S.

Coordinates: 33°37′35″N 83°19′26″W

Greshamville is an unincorporated community in Greene County, in the U.S. state of Georgia.

== History ==
A post office called Greshamville was established in 1877, and remained in operation until 1953. The community most likely was named after Volney Gresham.
