= Essig, Minnesota =

Unincorporated community in Minnesota, US

Essig
- Unincorporated community
- Location within Minnesota Location within the United States
- Coordinates: 44°19′42″N 94°36′12″W
- Country: United States
- State: Minnesota
- County: Brown

Area
  - Total: 0.65 sq mi (1.68 km^{2})
  - Land: 0.65 sq mi (1.68 km^{2})
  - Water: 0 sq mi (0.00 km^{2})
- Elevation: 994 ft (303 m)

Population (2020)
  - Total: 49
  - Density: 75.5/sq mi (29.16/km^{2})
- Time zone: UTC-6 (Central (CST))
  - Summer (DST): UTC-5 (CDT)
- ZIP code: 56030
- Area code: 507
- GNIS feature ID: 2806358

Essig is an unincorporated community in Brown County, Minnesota, United States. As of the 2020 census, Essig had a population of 49. Essig is located on U.S. Route 14, 7 miles (11 km) west of New Ulm. Essig has a post office with ZIP code 56030.

== History ==
A post office called Essig has been in operation since 1886. The community was named for one of the Essig brothers who had built the first business there.

== Demographics ==
Historical population
Census	Pop.	Note	%±
2020	49		—
U.S. Decennial Census
