= Newmansville, Illinois =

- Unincorporated community
- Location within Illinois Location within the United States
- Coordinates: 40°00′12″N 90°00′42″W
- Country: United States
- State: Illinois
- County: Cass
- Township: Newmansville
- Elevation: 594 ft (181 m)
- Time zone: UTC-6 (Central (CST))
  - Summer (DST): UTC-5 (CDT)
- Area code: 217
- GNIS feature ID: 414494

Newmansville is an unincorporated community in Cass County, Illinois, United States. Newmansville is 10 miles (16 km) north of Ashland.
