= Gilkison =

Gilkison is a surname. Notable people with the surname include:

- Alan Gilkison (1909–1990), New Zealand company director
- Andrea Gilkison (fl. 1970s–1980s), New Zealand guitarist in the Wide Mouthed Frogs, predecessor of The Crocodiles
- Andrew Gilkison (fl. 1770s–1780s), innkeeper and namesake of Gilkison's Corner, Pennsylvania
- Frank Gilkison (1877–1955), Justice of the Indiana Supreme Court
- Jason Gilkison (born c. 1985), Australian professional ballroom dance champion and choreographer
- Jasper Tough Gilkison (fl. 1850s–1890s), Indian Department superintendent involved in the founding of Ohsweken, Ontario
- John Gilkison (1874–1964), New Zealand businessman in the 1957 New Year Honours (New Zealand)
- William Gilkison (1777–1833), Scottish-born British soldier who founded Elora, Ontario
