= Ambler station =

Railway station in Ambler, Pennsylvania

Ambler
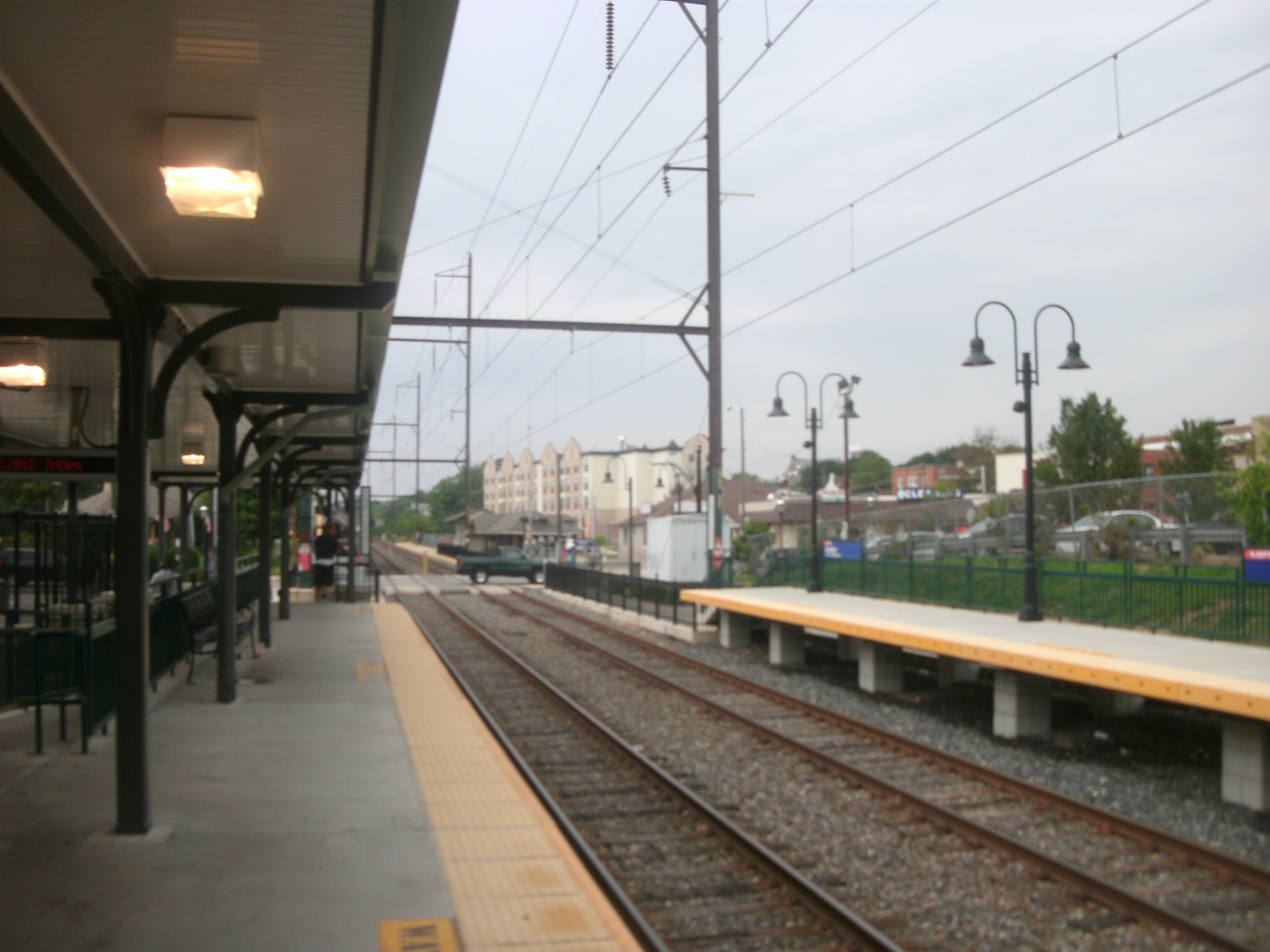
- The new high-level platform station at Ambler, facing the former stationhouse

General information
- Location: 30 South Main Street (Butler Avenue & Main Street); Ambler, Pennsylvania 19002
- Coordinates: 40.1536°N 75.2251°W
- Owner: SEPTA
- Line: SEPTA Main Line
- Platforms: 2 side platforms
- Tracks: 2
- Connections: SEPTA Suburban Bus: 94, 95

Construction
- Parking: 619 spaces (92 with permits)
- Accessible: Yes

Other information
- Fare zone: 3

History
- Opened: 1855
- Rebuilt: 1888
- Electrified: July 26, 1931
- Former names: Wissahickon (1855–1869)

Passengers
- 2017: 1,138 boardings 881 alightings (weekday average)
- Rank: 13 of 146

Services
| Preceding station | SEPTA | Following station |
|---|---|---|
| Fort Washington toward Penn Medicine Station | Lansdale/Doylestown Line | Penllyn toward Doylestown |
Former services
| Preceding station | Reading Railroad | Following station |
|---|---|---|
| Fort Washington toward Philadelphia | Bethlehem Branch | Penllyn toward Bethlehem |
Location

Ambler station is a SEPTA Regional Rail station in Ambler, Pennsylvania. It was originally built by the Reading Company as Wissahickon, until being renamed in 1869 after Mary Johnson Ambler, who helped direct the aftermath of the Great Train Wreck of 1856. The station serves the Lansdale/Doylestown Line. Its official address is at Butler Avenue and Main Street; however, the actual location is a block west on Butler Avenue and Short Race Street. The station provides connections to SEPTA Bus Routes 94 and 95. In FY 2017, Ambler station had a weekday average of 1,138 boardings and 881 alightings. The station includes a 619-space parking lot.

In 2010, the station was moved south across Butler Pike into an entirely new ADA-accessible facility with long elevated platforms adjacent to the parking lots and a brand new ticket office, waiting room, and bathroom on the inbound side.

The station was briefly featured in the 1966 Hayley Mills movie The Trouble with Angels, although subsequent station scenes were shot at the Glendale Transportation Center in California.

== Station layout ==
Ambler has two high-level side platforms.

== Gallery ==
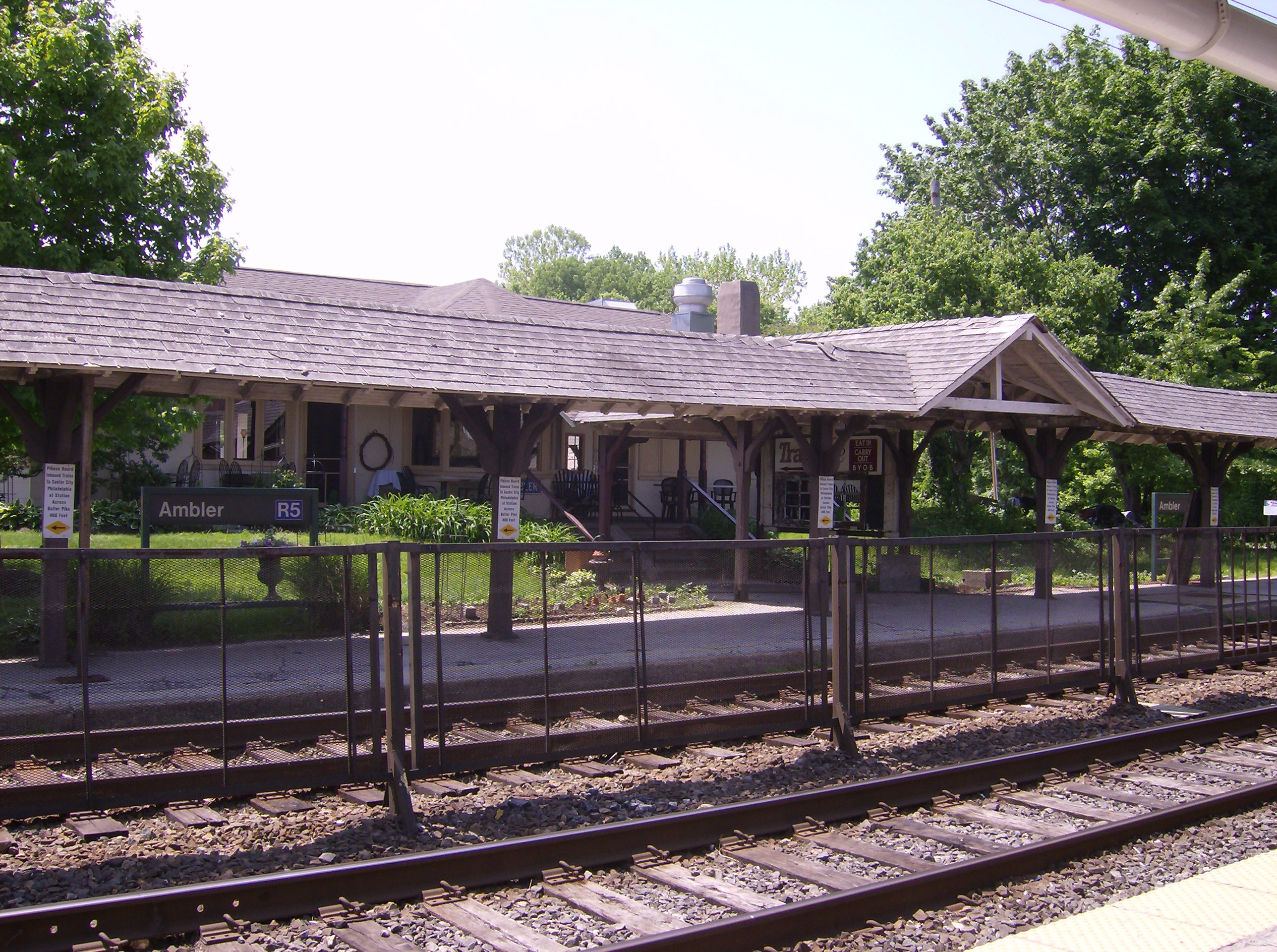
Original Ambler station in 2007

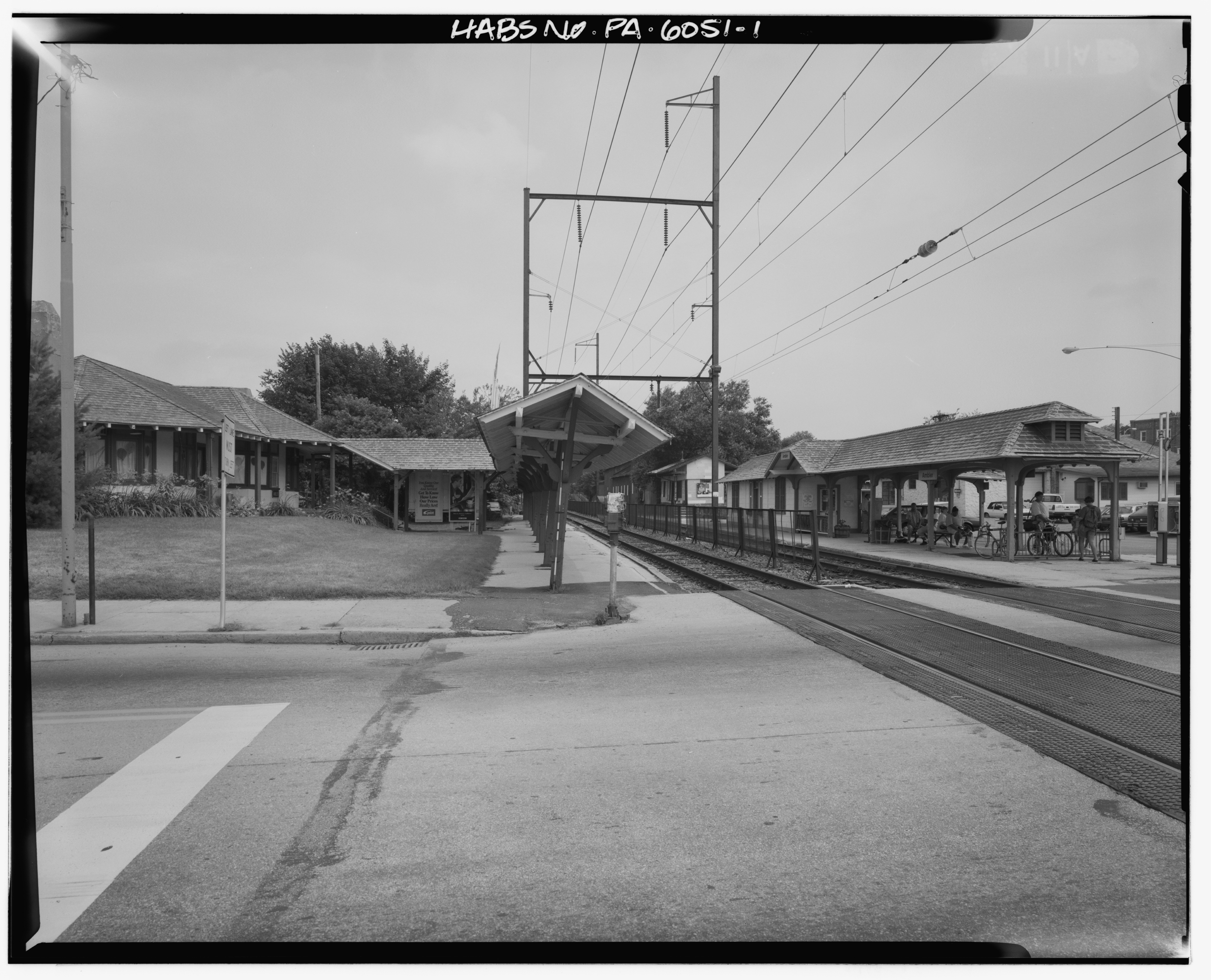
Original Ambler station

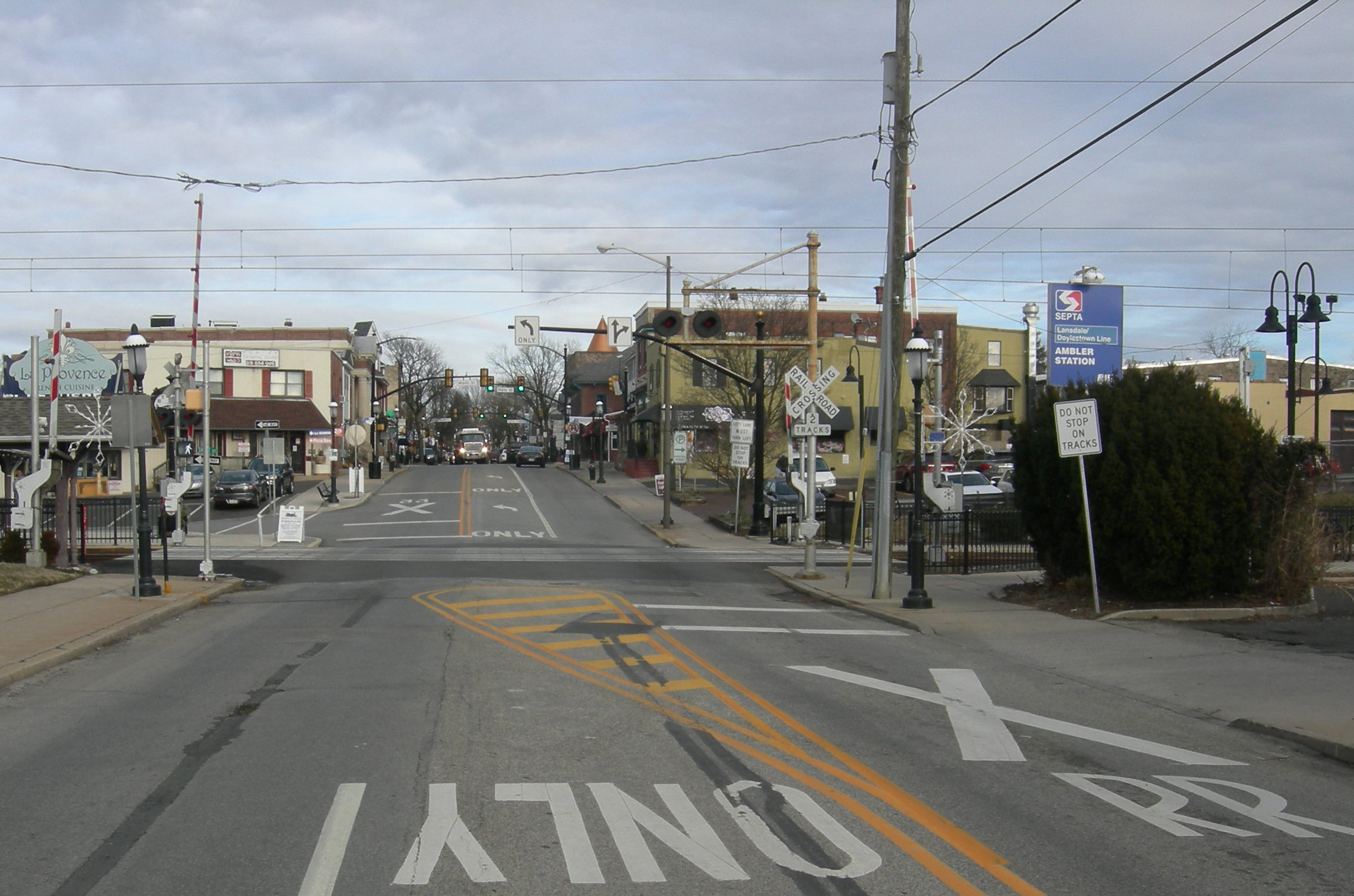
Butler Pike with old station to the left and new station to the right

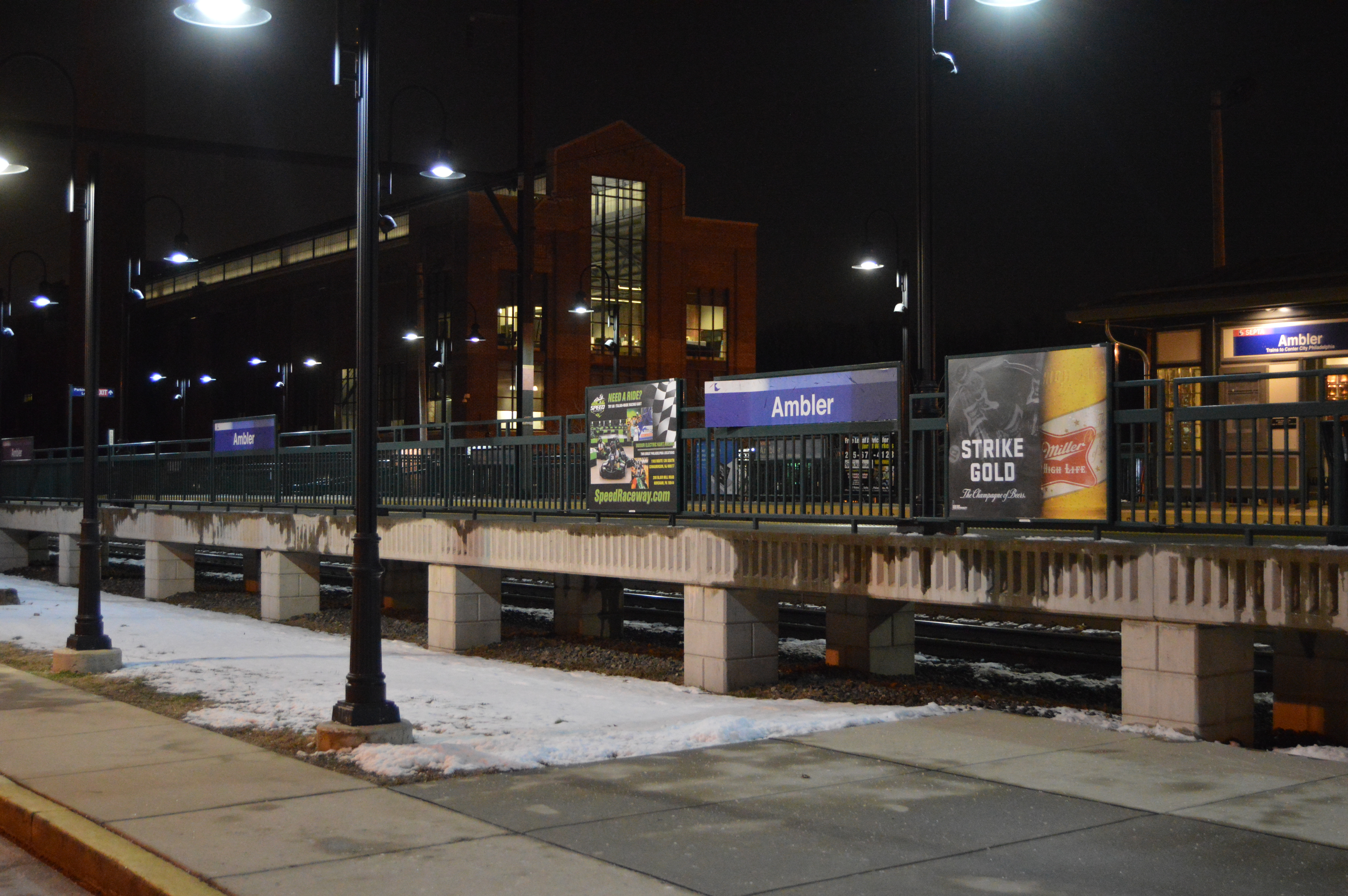
Ambler new station with elevated platforms
