= Butler Pike =

Route information
- Maintained by PennDOT, Montgomery County, and Borough of Ambler
- Length: 9.8 mi (15.8 km)
- Existed: 1712 (route established); 1849–1896 (turnpike); 1896–present

Major junctions
- Southwest end: Fayette Street in Conshohocken
- Ridge Pike in Harmonville; Germantown Pike in Plymouth Meeting; PA 73 southwest of Ambler; PA 309 northeast of Ambler; PA 63 in Maple Glen
- Northeast end: PA 152 in Horsham Township

Location
- Country: United States
- State: Pennsylvania
- Counties: Montgomery

Highway system
- Pennsylvania State Route System; Interstate; US; State; Scenic; Legislative

Butler Pike is a road in Montgomery County, Pennsylvania, that runs northeast from Conshohocken to Horsham Township. For most of its 9.8-mile (15.8 km) length, it is a county road and forms a boundary between townships.

== Route description ==
Fayette Street begins at the Schuylkill River and is the main street of the Borough of Conshohocken. At 11th Avenue, the borough boundary, Fayette Street's name changes to Butler Pike, and it continues northeast along the boundary between Plymouth Township and Whitemarsh Township as part of State Route 3016 (SR 3016), a four-lane undivided road and an unsigned quadrant route. The road passes through residential areas and intersects North Lane, where SR 3016 ends and Butler Pike becomes a county road. After this intersection, Butler Pike becomes a three-lane road with a center left-turn lane and passes a mix of homes and businesses, coming to a junction with Ridge Pike in a commercial area in the community of Harmonville. The roadway narrows to a two-lane undivided road and heads through residential neighborhoods, curving slightly to fully enter Whitemarsh Township as it bypasses the Plymouth Friends Meetinghouse, and reaching an offset intersection with Germantown Pike in Plymouth Meeting.

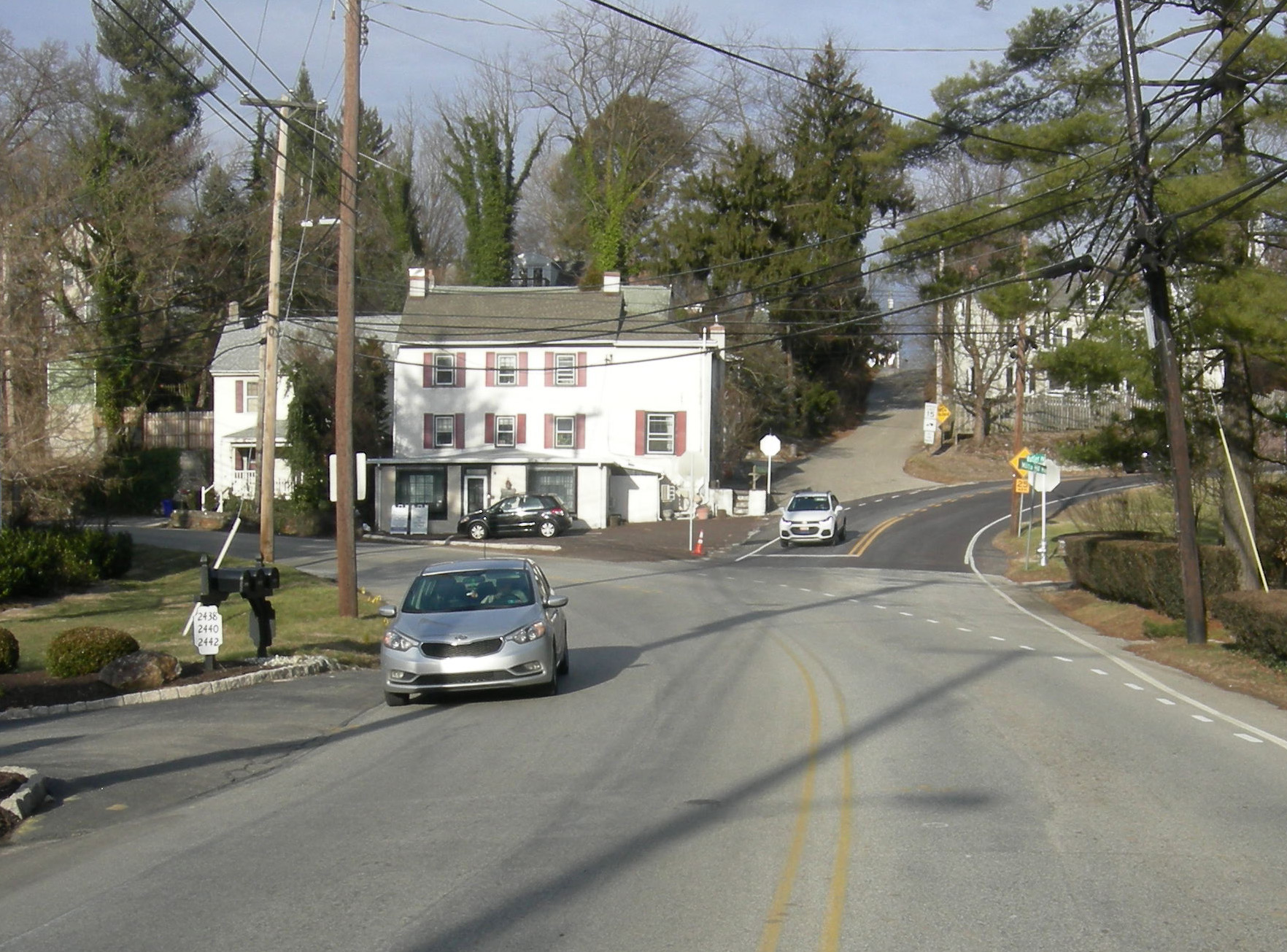
Northbound Butler Pike approaching Cold Point Hill; Butler Pike veers off to the left, Militia Hill Road veers off to the right, and Cold Point Hill Road continues straight over the hill.

Butler Pike continues northeast along the boundary between Plymouth Township to the northwest and Whitemarsh Township to the southeast as a two-lane undivided road, passing industrial parks and heading under Norfolk Southern's Morrisville Line (formerly the Pennsylvania Railroad's Trenton Cutoff). The road passes near residential development and intersects Plymouth Road/Flourtown Road in the community of Cold Point. From here, Butler Pike passes more homes and curves northwest to fully enter Plymouth Township as it bypasses Cold Point Hill, while Cold Point Hill Road continues northeast along the township line. Butler Pike makes a sharp turn to the east before curving back to the northeast, recovering its path along the township line and passing under the Pennsylvania Turnpike (Interstate 276). The road continues through wooded areas of homes and commercial development, at the Township Line Road intersection becoming the boundary between Whitpain Township to the northwest and Whitemarsh Township to the southeast. The road runs through wooded residential areas before it comes to an intersection with PA 73 in an area of businesses in the community of Broad Axe. Following this intersection, Butler Pike continues northeast through a mix of fields, woods, and homes. The road curves east-northeast to fully enter Whitemarsh Township before it heads northeast into Upper Dublin Township and crosses Morris Road as it heads into forested areas.

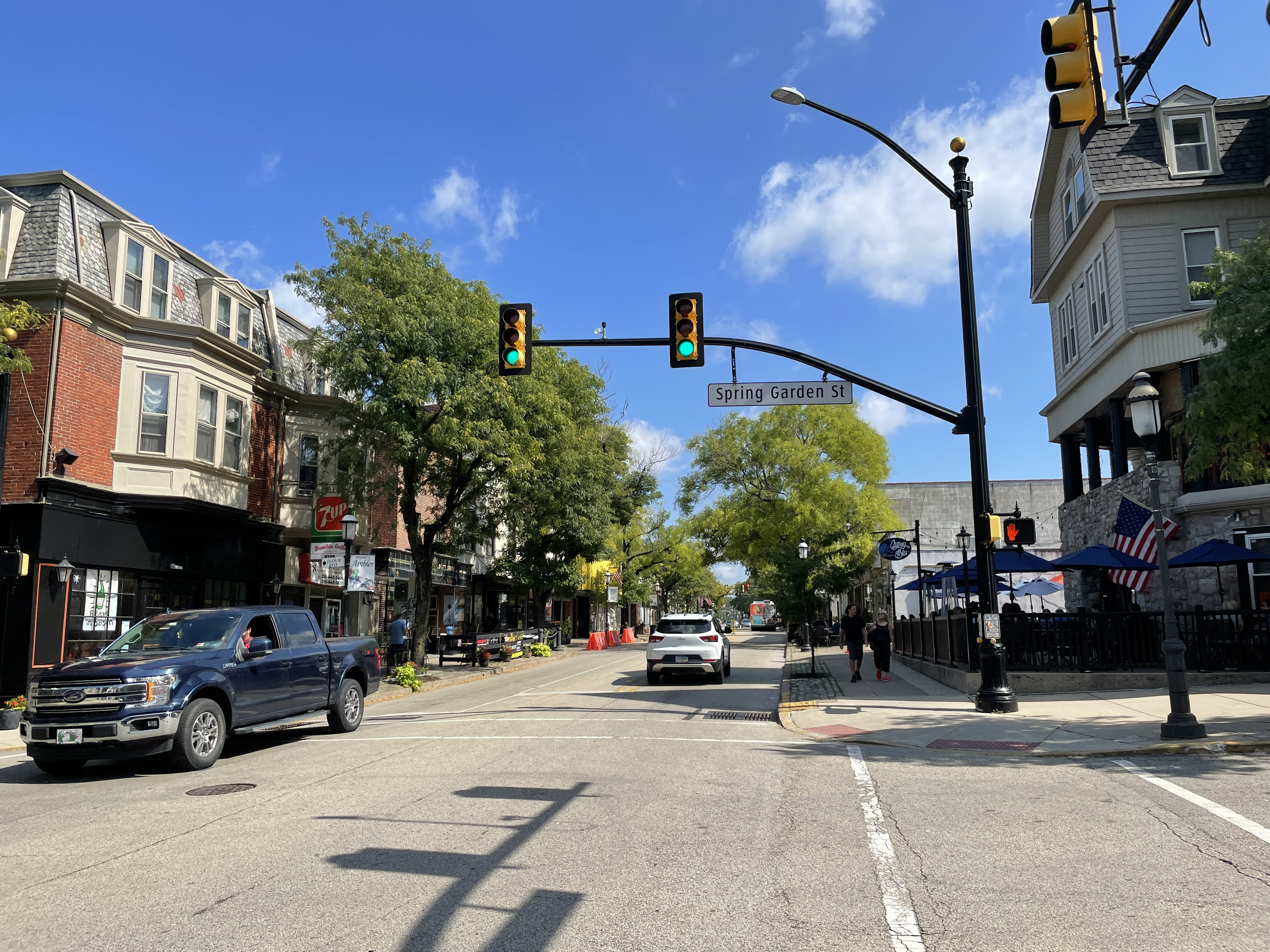
Butler Avenue in Ambler

The road crosses the Wissahickon Creek and enters the borough of Ambler, where the name changes to West Butler Avenue. The roadway heads east-northeast through commercial areas before it crosses SEPTA's Lansdale/Doylestown Line at-grade north of Ambler station. At this point, West Butler Avenue heads into the commercial downtown of Ambler. At the Main Street intersection, the road becomes East Butler Avenue and runs through more of the downtown area. The road heads northeast past more businesses before it runs through residential areas. On the eastern border of Ambler, the road comes to an intersection with Bethlehem Pike. Upon crossing Bethlehem Pike, Butler Pike leaves Ambler for Upper Dublin Township and passes through residential areas, coming to an intersection with Susquehanna Road in the community of Rose Valley. Butler Pike reaches a partial interchange with the PA 309 freeway, with access to northbound PA 309 and access from southbound PA 309; the missing movements are provided via an interchange with Susquehanna Road. Past the PA 309 interchange, the road continues northeast through wooded residential areas and comes to a junction with Norristown Road in the community of Three Tuns. From here, Butler Pike passes more residential neighborhoods as it heads into Maple Glen, where it intersects PA 63 and crosses into Horsham Township. Butler Pike runs through wooded areas of homes and comes to its terminus at an intersection with PA 152.

== History ==
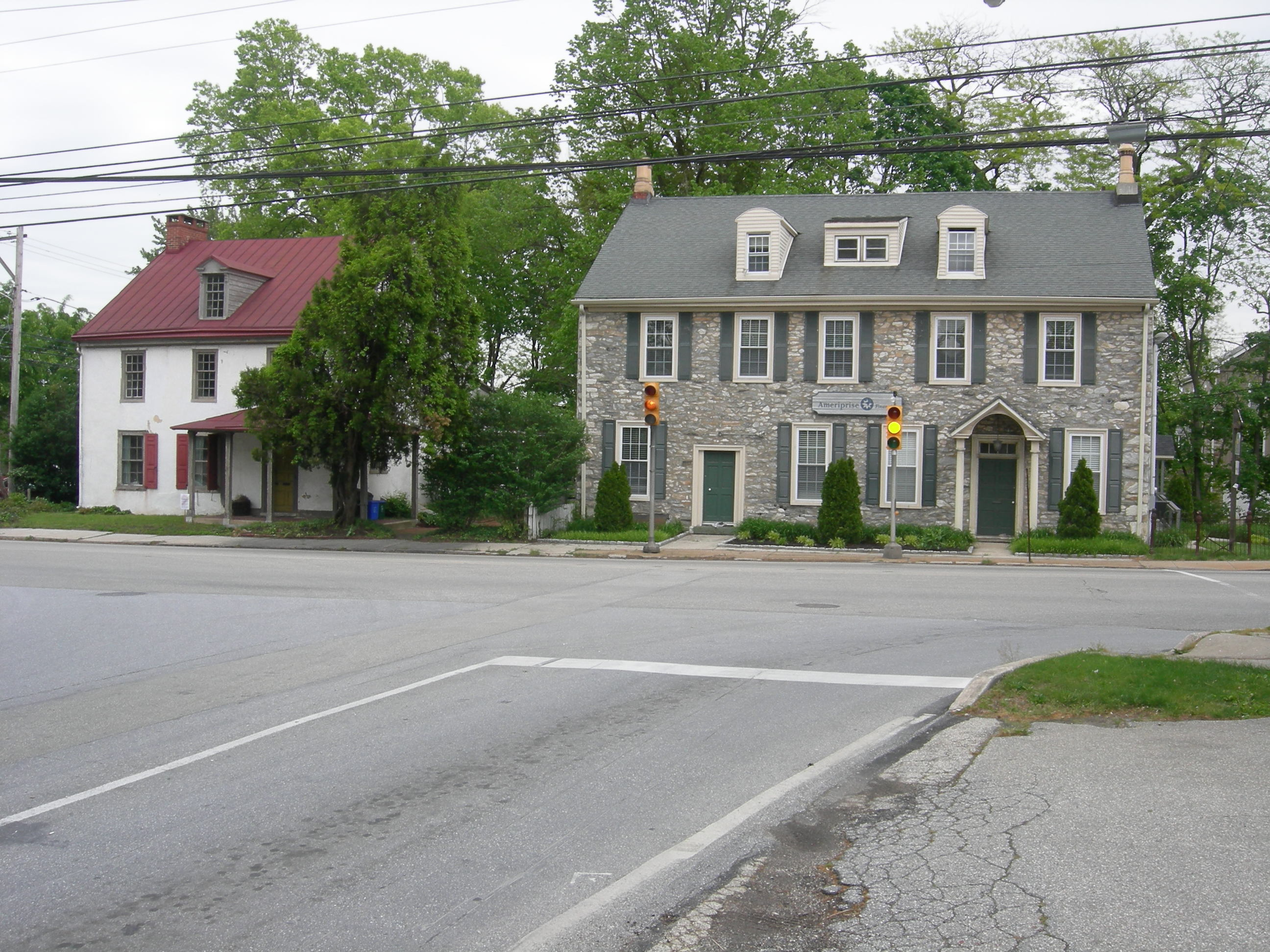
Offset intersection of Butler Pike (foreground) and Germantown Pike in Plymouth Meeting

The route was laid out in 1712 by Simon Butler (1684–1764), a Bucks County miller and justice of the peace, for whom the road was later named. It provided access to the Schuylkill River at Matson's Ford (Conshohocken), and facilitated communication among the Quaker meeting houses in Plymouth Meeting, Upper Dublin, Horsham, and central Bucks County.

In the early 19th century, Butler Pike became part of a route used in the Underground Railroad. For more than 20 years, George and Martha Maulsby Corson sheltered fugitive slaves in their house at the corner of Germantown and Butler pikes. The Underground Railroad stops were located 5 to 10 miles (8.0 to 16.1 km) apart, and under cover of darkness a conductor would escort the enslaved to the next stop.

Two sections of Butler Pike were converted into turnpikes in the mid-19th century—the Whitemarsh and Plymouth Turnpike, which improved the road between Germantown Pike and Conshohocken, and operated from 1849 to 1896; and the Upper Dublin and Plymouth Turnpike, which improved the road between Germantown Pike and Limekiln Pike, and operated from 1855 to 1896.

== Major intersections ==
The entire route is in Montgomery County.

Location	mi	km	Destinations	Notes
Conshohocken	0	0.0	SR 3016 (Fayette Street)	Southern terminus
Whitpain–Whitemarsh township line			PA 73 (Skippack Pike)	
Upper Dublin Township	6.0	9.7	Morris Road	
Ambler–Upper Dublin Township line	7.1	11.4	Bethlehem Pike	
Upper Dublin Township			PA 309 north (Fort Washington Expressway) – Montgomeryville	Interchange; access to northbound PA 309 and access from southbound PA 309; missing movements provided by Susquehanna Road
Upper Dublin–Horsham township line			PA 63 (Welsh Road)	
Horsham Township	9.8	15.8	PA 152 (Limekiln Pike)	Northern terminus
1.000 mi = 1.609 km; 1.000 km = 0.621 mi: Incomplete access
