= John Ford (baseball) =

American baseball player

- Pitcher
- Born: September 22, 1894; Ambler, Pennsylvania, U.S.
- Died: March 8, 1947 (aged 52)

Negro league baseball debut
- 1917, for the Hilldale Club

Last appearance
- 1917, for the Hilldale Club

Teams
- Hilldale Club (1917)

John Dallas Cecil Ford (September 22, 1894 – March 8, 1947) was an American Negro league pitcher in the 1910s.

A native of Ambler, Pennsylvania, Ford played for the Hilldale Club in 1917. He died in 1947 at age 52.
