= Great Train Wreck of 1856 =

1856 railroad accident in Pennsylvania

The Great Train Wreck of 1856
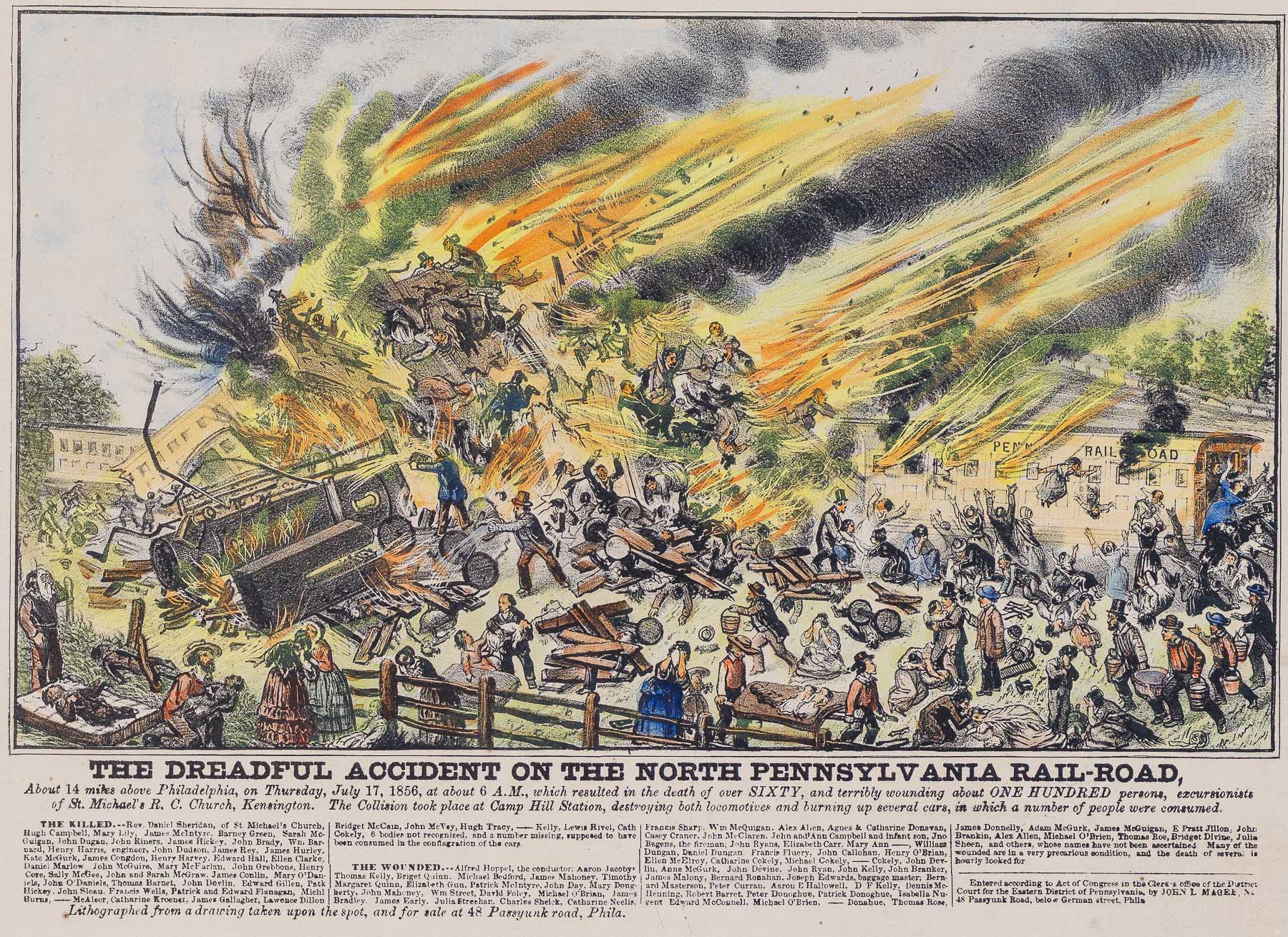
- The dreadful accident on the North Pennsylvania Railroad by John L. Magee

Details
- Date: July 17, 1856; 170 years ago 6:18 a.m.
- Location: Whitemarsh Township, Pennsylvania
- Coordinates: 40°07′43.66″N 75°12′10.56″W
- Country: United States
- Operator: North Pennsylvania Railroad
- Incident type: Head-on collision
- Cause: Human error

Statistics
- Trains: 2: "Shakamaxon" and "Aramingo"
- Passengers: "Shakamaxon": 1,100–1,500; "Aramingo": 20
- Deaths: 51+
- Injured: 100+

The Great Train Wreck of 1856 occurred in Whitemarsh Township, Pennsylvania, between Camp Hill station (known as Sandy Run, Camp Hill, Sellwick and finally Fellwick station before being closed in 1996) and Fort Washington station, on July 17, 1856. Two trains, traveling on the same track in converging directions, collided, killing between 59 and 67, and injuring over 100. The incident was referred to as The Camp Hill Disaster in Montgomery County, and The Picnic Train Tragedy in Philadelphia. It was the deadliest railroad catastrophe in the world up to that time and became one of the signature events of its era.

== The North Pennsylvania Railroad ==
Growing impetus for the construction of a railroad connecting Philadelphia with the Lehigh Valley resulted in the incorporation on April 8, 1852, of the Philadelphia, Easton and Water Gap Railroad Company. A spur of the railroad, whose name was changed on April 18, 1853, to the North Pennsylvania Railroad Company, was formally opened Monday, July 2, 1855, with an excursion from Cohoquinoque station, at Front and Willow Streets in Philadelphia, to Wissahickon (present-day Ambler), an outlying area to the northwest. Farmers could now ship their produce more economically to markets increasingly far from home. The railroad, which transported both freight and people, was already becoming an important component of local commerce when the wreck occurred.

== The disaster ==
An excursion train operated by the North Pennsylvania Railroad, known as the "Picnic Special," had been contracted by St. Michael's Roman Catholic Church in Philadelphia's Kensington section to send their Sunday School children on a picnic in Shaeff's Woods, a sprawling grove near the railroad's Wissahickon (present-day Ambler) station. July 17 was one of the hottest days of the year and the children looked forward to a full day at the park. The train, reported as carrying 1,100 people by The New York Times (although there may have been as many as 1,500), was due to arrive in Wissahickon at 6 a.m. It left Cohocksink depot at Master Street and Germantown Avenue at 5:10 a.m., 23 minutes late, partly due to the large number of passengers aboard.

The train's locomotive was called Shakamaxon (in honor of Kensington's Native American name) and was operated by engineer Henry Harris under conductor Edward F. Hoppel. The engine, known for having low steam pressure, was under a sizable strain as it pulled between 10 and 12 cars overloaded with passengers. A priest, Daniel Sheridan, was in the lead car with the older children. The rear cars carried women and the younger children. The train had to make periodic stops to regain enough pressure to continue.

At the Wissahickon (present-day Ambler) station another train, the Aramingo, with conductor William Vanstavoren and engineer William Lee, waited for the excursion to pass on the single track line that had opened one year and 15 days earlier. Shakamaxon was late, but the conductor did not use the telegraph to communicate with Cohoquinoque and had no idea when the excursion had left. There was a customary 15-minute waiting period for regularly scheduled trains, but the picnic special was an excursion train, which confused matters. At 6:15, the Aramingo, carrying 20 passengers from Gwynedd, pulled out of the station.

The conductor of Shakamaxon was confident he could make up for the time he had lost. He knew the Aramingo was due in the opposite direction on the same single track, but estimated they could use the siding at Edge Hill to safely pass each other. As he neared a blind curve just past Camp Hill Station, the train was travelling slightly downhill. Aramingo was rounding the same curve with the same blind spot. Harris blew the whistle almost continuously, but this apparently kept him from hearing the other train's whistle; neither engineer knew exactly where the other was.

As the two trains rounded the curve, the engineers finally caught sight of one another before colliding head-on at 6:18 a.m., between the Camp Hill station and the present-day crossing of the Pennsylvania Railroad's Trenton cut-off over the Bethlehem branch of the Reading Railroad.

The boilers made direct contact causing an explosion heard up to five miles (8 km) away. The three forward cars of the picnic train were obliterated and the subsequent derailment caused a fire to spread among the wooden cars. The initial impact did not kill most of the victims; most were caught in burning derailed cars that were on their sides. The women and children who occupied the rear coaches were able to escape serious injury.

A crowd gathered quickly from neighboring towns. The blaze could be seen for several miles and a man reportedly rode on horseback through the Montgomery County countryside while shouting to the residents: "Bring your camphor bottles, balsam and lint; there has been a horrible accident." Rescue was made extremely difficult due to the intense heat from the burning wreckage.

Sandy Run, a small creek, ran about 25 feet (7.6 m) below the level of the tracks, meandering along the length of the train. A bucket brigade was formed down to the edge of the stream by the onlookers to little avail. The Congress Engine and Hose Company of Chestnut Hill finally reached the scene and, in fairly rapid order, subdued the flames and began to extricate the victims.

John Spencer of Camp Hill, an eyewitness who lived within sight of the collision, gave the following account at a coroner's investigation: "I was looking out of my shop window and saw the train approaching. I saw the down train first, just coming through the cut above Camp Hill station. It was slacking off as much as it could when it came through there. I had just time enough to turn around and saw the up train coming under the bridge at Camp Hill station. It was pretty smart. They were running about as they cleverly could. I heard the whistle on the train coming up before it reached the bridge... I could not see that the speed of the up train diminished between the time I first saw it and the time of the collision....eleven of the bodies of the dead were carried to my shop."

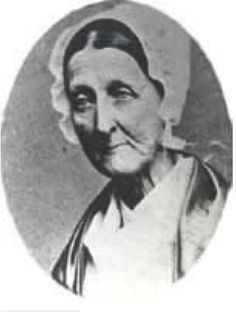
Mary Ambler (1805–1868)

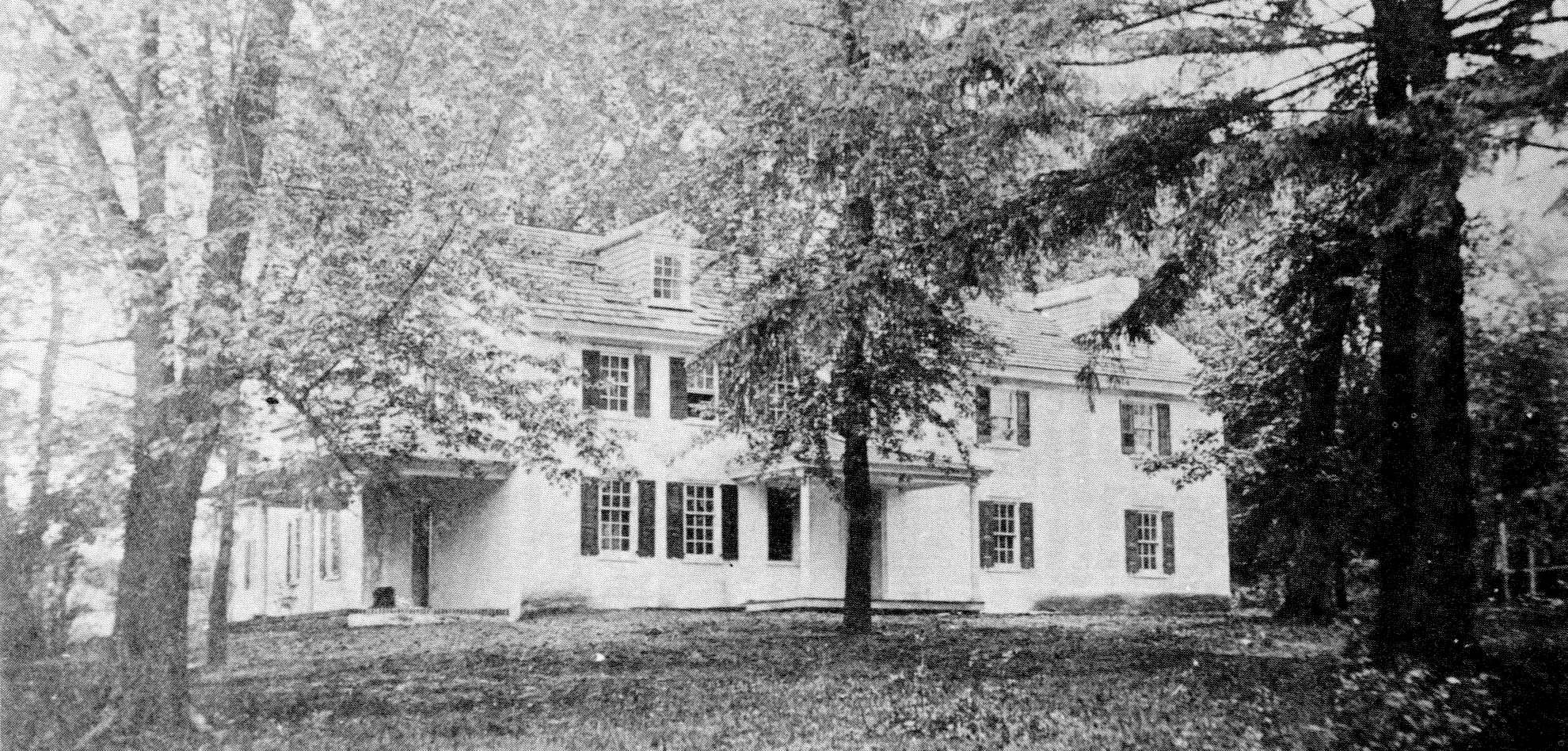
Mary Ambler homestead, Ambler, Pennsylvania

Mary Ambler, a middle-aged Quaker woman who resided near the Wissahickon station, quickly gathered first-aid materials and covered the two-mile distance between her home and the disaster site on foot. The service she rendered in caring for the injured was so conspicuous that after her death in 1868, the North Pennsylvania Railroad changed the name of the station from Wissahickon to Ambler. Eventually, the town itself was named for Mrs. Ambler.

As news of the accident reached the city and spread through the parish, people began to grieve and many more rushed to the scene of the crash. At Cohocksink station, they had to be restrained by police when they attempted to use the hand-cars. Coaches were attached to an idle locomotive at the station, but they were given over almost entirely to the Sisters of Charity.

The Daily Evening Bulletin reported: "the most horrible sight of all was that of the burning cars; in a few minutes after the collision, the fire spread rapidly through the broken remnants, burning and roasting to death many men, women and children. The groans and shouts of wounded and those held by the rescuers were of a character to appall the bravest heart."

Henry Harris, engineer of the picnic special, died in the accident as did Father Sheridan. The devastation was so extreme that many bodies were never found, and those that were so badly burned that they could not be identified.

== Aftermath ==
The conductor of the Aramingo, William Vanstavoren, who escaped uninjured, apparently felt he was to blame for the accident. He returned to Philadelphia, officially reported the accident, and then went to his residence at 169 Buttonwood St. (near 10th St.) and committed suicide by arsenic. However, he was later absolved of any blame by the coroner's jury, which blamed the accident on the "gross carelessness" of Alfred Hoppel, the conductor of the Shackamaxon picnic special. Hoppel was then tried for manslaughter, but acquitted; Vanstavoren's suicide was cited in evidence.

Two days after the accident, the Pennsylvania Inquirer said, "The most eager interest is still shown in all that relates to the awful tragedy of Thursday." The story of the accident was retold across the world, sometimes in exaggerated form. For example, a news ballad sold in Norway tells the "sad song of the terrible accident on the railway in North America on the 17th of July 1856, where 200 children tragically died".

The North Pennsylvania Railroad took steps after the accident to provide financial benefits for the injured and for survivors of the victims. They issued shares of stock to those who would accept it and gave money to those who would not. As it turned out, the shares eventually paid worthwhile dividends. The railroad closed down operations on the following Sunday to honor the victims.

Two days after the Great Wreck, The New York Times published a scathing editorial exhorting railroads to exercise greater safety. Namely, trains travelling in two directions should never share the same tracks (the site is now double-tracked from Wayne Junction to Lansdale station and electrified with a 70 miles per hour (110 km/h) track speed). More broadly, there were several other changes implemented, such as the use of the telegraph to notify stations of late trains and communicate other relevant information. The number of passengers on trains became a major concern, especially as it applied to children.

== Casualties ==
- William T. Barnett, 18
- Michael Burns, 17
- John Bradley, 14
- Theresa Callahan, 18
- Hugh Campbell, 15
- James Canlin, 17
- Ellen Clark, 14
- Catharine Coakley, 14
- Neilus Coakley, 16
- Henry Corr, 50
- Caroline Croener, 13
- James Devine, 11
- Lawrence Dillen, 50
- John Dudsen, 21
- John Dugan, 17
- William Dugan, 17
- Edward Flanigen, 16
- Patrick Flanigen, 14
- James Gallagher, 20
- Bernard Green, 18
- John Grilbeu, 17
- Mrs. Gunn, 60
- James Hackey, 15
- Michael Hagerty, 15
- Edward Hall, 20
- Harry Harris, 30
- Patrick Kearney, 19
- Patrick Kelly, 16
- Thomas Kelly, 16
- Annie Lilley, 16
- Daniel Marlow, 9
- John McAleer, 18
- Mary McArlane, 13
- Francis McCort, 21
- Sarah McGee, 18
- William McGuigan, 15
- John McGuire, 18
- Catharine McGurk, 16
- James McIntyre, 16
- John McVey, 15
- Rose Ann Mulholland, 15
- Miczael O'Brien, 17
- Hugh O'Neal, 14
- James Quigley, 14
- Lewis Rivell, 10
- Bernard Ronegan, 18
- James Roy, 20
- John Ryan, 15
- Rev. Daniel Sheridan, 35
- Mary Short, 16
- John Sloan, 13
- William Streets, 18
- Hugh Tracey, 16
- Francis Walls, 21
