= Mary Ambler =

American humanitarian

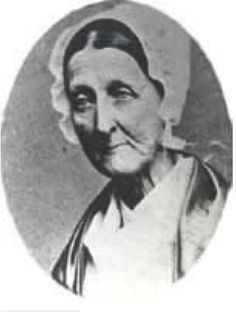
- Born: Mary Johnson; March 24, 1805; Richland Township, Pennsylvania, US
- Died: August 18, 1868 (aged 63); Ambler, Pennsylvania, US
- Occupations: Humanitarian, fuller
- Known for: Rescuing and caring for survivors of the Great Train Wreck of 1856

Mary Johnson Ambler (March 24, 1805 – August 18, 1868) was an American humanitarian and fuller who helped organize the rescue of survivors of the Great Train Wreck of 1856 in Pennsylvania. The borough of Ambler was named in her honor.

== Biography ==
Ambler was born to Abigail and Benjamin Johnson of Richland Township in 1805. Little is known of her early years. She married Andrew Ambler, a weaver and fuller, on May 14, 1829. Three years later, the Amblers purchased the Fulling Mill and eighty-three acres in the village of Wissahickon. They repaired the run-down, century-old mill and began manufacturing woolen blankets and clothing. They had seven sons and one daughter and ran the mill until Andrew died on March 7, 1850. The widowed Mary and her married son, Lewis, continued to run the mill until she died on August 18, 1868, and was interred at the Gwynedd Friends Meeting cemetery. During the Civil War, the mill supplied blankets and uniforms to the Union Army.

Ambler was a devout Quaker of German descent. She started a Sunday school, permitted neighbors to draw water freely from her well, and gained local recognition for charitable endeavors. Small and frail, she never weighed more than 90 pounds.

== Disaster ==
At 6:15 am on July 17, 1856, two passenger trains running on the same track collided head-on between the Fort Washington and Camp Hill stations. (Camp Hill station was located in Whitemarsh township, PA. It was formerly known as Sandy Run, Camp Hill, Sellwick then SEPTA Fellwick station before being closed in 1996.). Of 1100 passengers on board the trains, at least 59 died and 86 suffered injuries. Many of the victims burned to death after the wreckage caught fire. About 600 of the passengers had come from St. Michael's Roman Catholic Church, which had hired the "Picnic Special" train to transport parishioners to a Sunday picnic in the countryside.

When Ambler learned about the wreck, she gathered bandages and other medical supplies and walked several miles to the scene of the disaster, where she calmly and methodically ministered to the injured and directed rescue efforts. She ordered other rescuers to tear down house shutters to carry seriously injured victims to her house, which she hastily converted a makeshift hospital. She worked nonstop for twenty-four hours straight. Her efforts reportedly saved many lives.

== Legacy ==
To commemorate Ambler's heroic rescue efforts, the North Pennsylvania Railroad renamed the Wissahickon train station to Ambler train station in her honor on July 20, 1869. When the village of Wissahickon incorporated into a borough on November 22, 1887, locals renamed their town in honor of Ambler. The town post office took the same name.
