= Ambler, Pennsylvania =

Borough in Pennsylvania, US

Borough of Ambler
- Borough
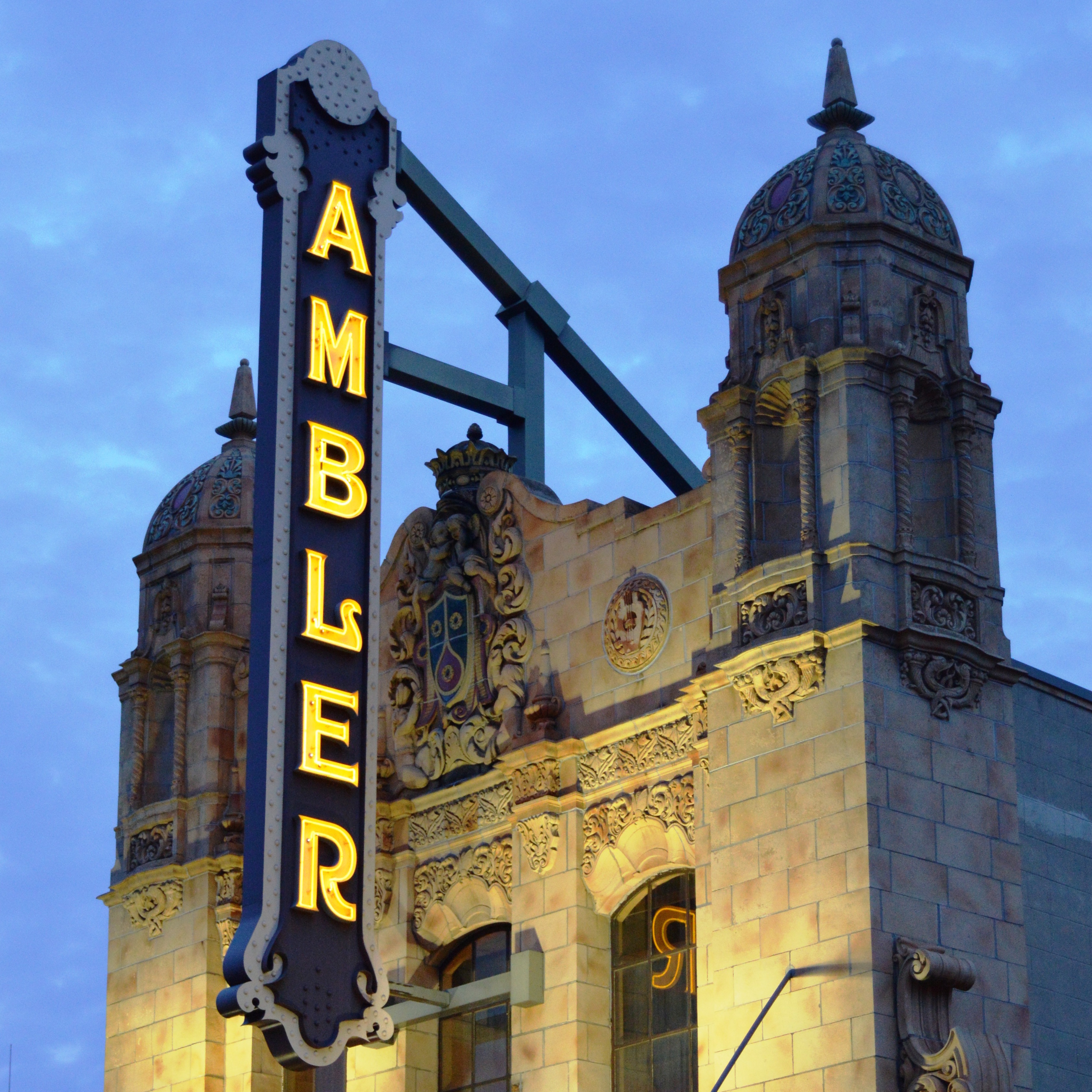
- The historic Ambler Theater

- Seal

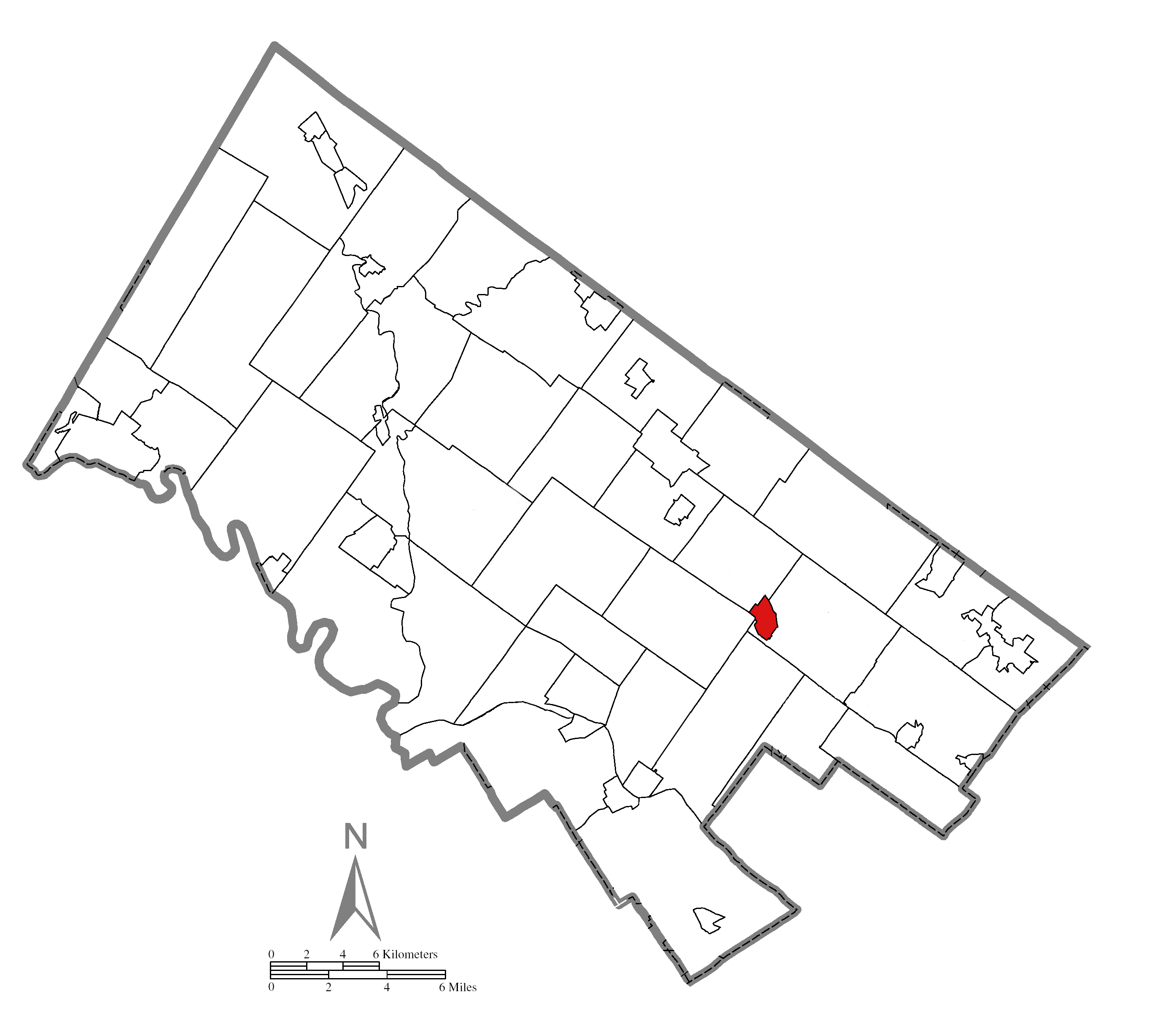
- Location of Ambler in Montgomery County, Pennsylvania

- Location of Ambler in Pennsylvania Ambler (the United States)
- Coordinates: 40°09′18″N 75°13′13″W
- Country: United States
- State: Pennsylvania
- County: Montgomery
- Settled: 1682

Government
  - Type: Council-manager
  - Mayor: Jeanne Sorg

Area
  - Total: 0.85 sq mi (2.21 km^{2})
  - Land: 0.85 sq mi (2.21 km^{2})
  - Water: 0 sq mi (0.00 km^{2})
- Elevation: 220 ft (67 m)

Population (2020)
  - Total: 6,807
  - Density: 7,987.2/sq mi (3,083.89/km^{2})
- Time zone: UTC-5 (EST)
  - Summer (DST): UTC-4 (EDT)
- ZIP Code: 19002
- Area codes: 215, 267, and 445
- FIPS code: 42-02264
- Website: boroughofambler.com

Ambler is a borough in Montgomery County, Pennsylvania, United States. It is located approximately 16 miles (26 km) north of Center City Philadelphia.

As of the 2020 census, Ambler had a population of 6,807.

== History ==
=== Lenape ===
The historical territory of the Lenape Native American tribe was in the Delaware Valley in an area spanning from Cape Henlopen in Delaware, north to the lower Hudson Valley in southern New York. The area in the south, including present-day Philadelphia and nearby Ambler, was the home of Unami-speaking Lenape. The Lenape established a peace treaty with Quaker William Penn in the 1680s.

=== Harmer family ===
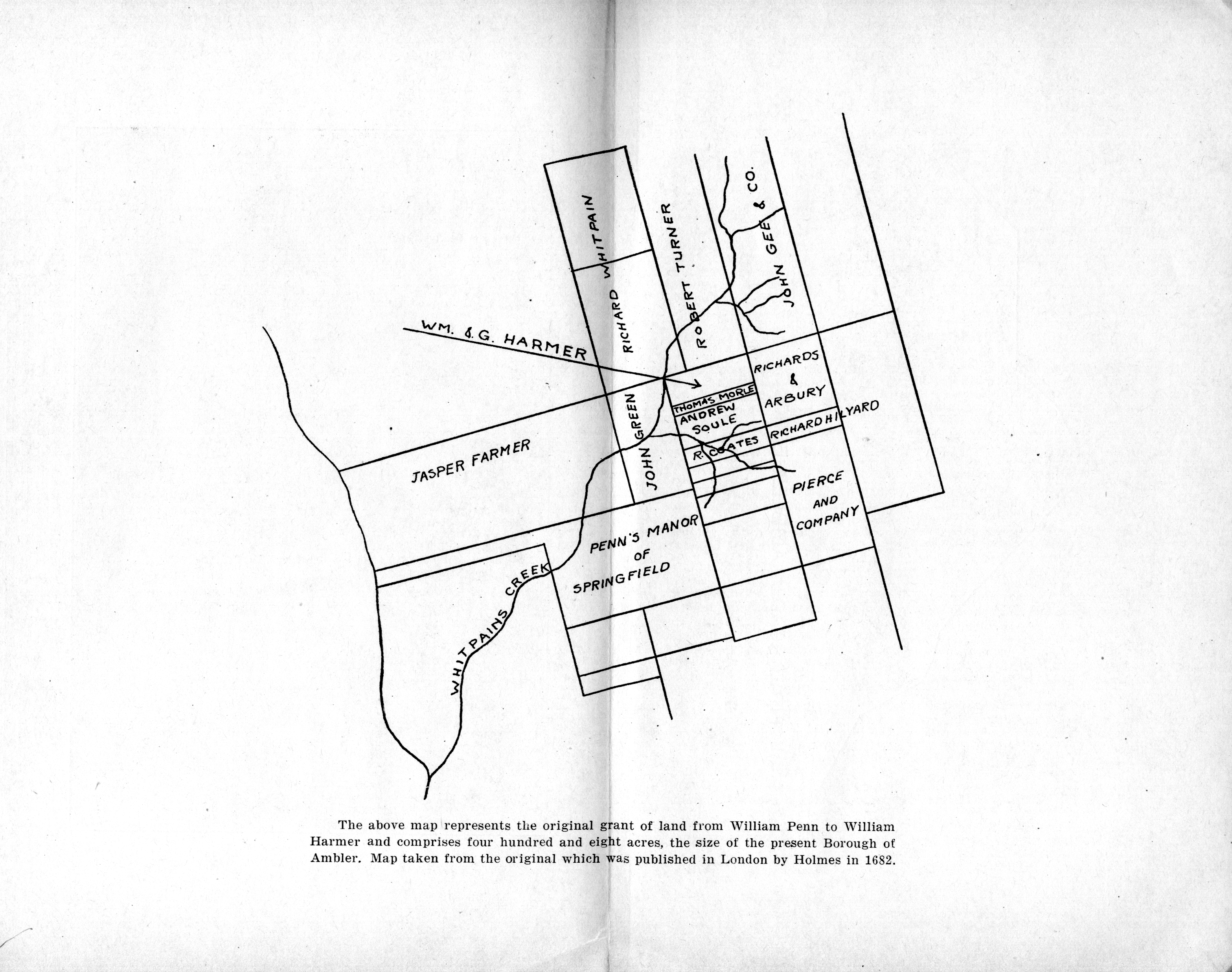
The original grant of land from William Penn to William Harmer

William and George Harmer are listed among the Quakers who immigrated to Pennsylvania in 1682. In 1716, William and George Harmer purchased a 408-acre tract from William Penn, an area including most of what now is Ambler Borough. They are credited as the first landholders to actually settle in the area. William Harmer built a gristmill powered by the Wissahickon Creek, "the first commercial venture in the Ambler area". He also built a stone dwelling with casement windows and diamond shaped leaded glass, near what is now the intersection of Butler Pike and Morris Road. After his death in 1731, the house, mill, and property were sold to Morris Morris and his wife Susanna Heath Morris.

=== Wissahickon ===
Residents sought permission from The Crown to build roads in the area. The first road built in Ambler, now known as Mt. Pleasant Avenue, was developed in 1730. It went from Harmer's Mill to North Wales Road, which is now Bethlehem Pike. Butler Pike was created in 1739, and went through the town, which was known at that time as the Village of Wissahickon, named after Wissahickon Creek.

The area at the crossroads of Butler and Bethlehem Pike was roughly the village center. It was first known as Gilkey's Corner, named for an inn which was built around 1778 and managed by Andrew Gilkinson (or Gilkeson). After 1878, the area was known as "Rose Valley".

As of 1790, Jonathan Thomas purchased half an acre of land from Gilkinson and sited a tannery at the intersection, causing a nearby creek to be nicknamed "Tannery Run". As of 1810, the tannery was sold by his son, David Thomas, to Joseph Rutter. As the "Rose Valley Tannery", it is mentioned as being one of the oldest in the county. It later became the property of Alvin Faust and the firm A. D. Faust Sons.

Between 1750 and 1850, industries developed throughout the watershed, using local waterways to provide power and carry away waste. The area supported nine mills, producing flour, timber, paper and cloth. They are identified by Dr. Mary Hough as Plumly Mill (first owned by William Harmer), Fulling Mill (owned by Andrew and Mary Ambler), Thomson's Mill, Reiff Mill, Wertsner Mill, Hague Mill, Burk Mill, a Silk Mill, and a Clover and Chopping and Saw Mill. However, as steam power replaced water power in the 1870s and 1880s, the mills were unable to compete, and were abandoned.

=== Mary Johnson Ambler ===
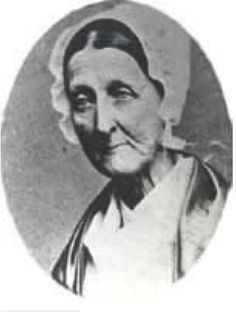
Mary Ambler, who turned her Ambler home into an impromptu hospital following the Great Train Wreck of 1856

In 1855, Wissahickon station became a stop on the North Pennsylvania Railroad line. On July 17, 1856, the town was the site of a disastrous train accident, known as the Great Train Wreck of 1856. The northbound Shackamaxon, a picnic excursion train, and the southbound Aramingo collided head on, killing 59 people instantly, and injuring another 86 passengers. Mary Ambler, a local Quaker resident, walked two miles to the crash site, bringing medical supplies and directing rescue efforts. She turned her house at Tennis Avenue and Main Street into an impromptu hospital for nursing the survivors. Thirteen years later, in 1869, the railway company renamed the station Ambler in her honor. The post office followed suit, and when the borough was formally incorporated on June 16, 1888, it too took the name of Ambler, in honor of Mary Ambler.

=== Keasbey and Mattison ===
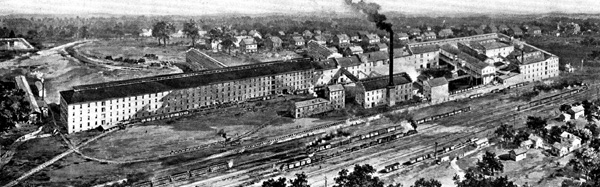
The Keasbey & Mattison Company plant in Ambler, c. 1900

In 1881, the Keasbey and Mattison Company, whose business included the manufacture of asbestos, moved to Ambler from Philadelphia. Ambler's location along the railroad line was a primary consideration in the location of Keasbey and Mattison Company in Ambler, as it meant that raw asbestos could be easily brought in from Quebec and finished products sent out to markets. Another consideration was the availability of magnesium carbonate, from local dolomite mines. The original K&M factory was built as of 1883.

When the company arrived, the town consisted of "70 houses, 250 residents, a drug store, general store and a few other businesses." Keasbey and Mattison invested heavily in the town, bringing in Southern Italian stoneworkers to build 400 houses for workers and managers, as well as offices, an opera house, the Trinity Memorial Episcopal Church, and Mattison's personal estate, Lindenwold Castle. Many of the Italians stayed in Ambler, helping to form its cultural identity. Maida, Calabria is the town's sister city today. The company also employed African Americans, originally from Virginia, in the less-desirable wet-processing areas of the asbestos plant. They tended to settle in west and south Ambler.

By World War I, Ambler was known as the "asbestos capital of the world". However, the Great Depression took its toll, and the company was sold to an English concern, Turner & Newall (T&N), in 1934. The plant continued to operate under the K&M name.

In England in 1924, doctors reported the first case of asbestosis, a chronic illness caused by the inhalation of asbestos fibers. By the 1950s, evidence linking asbestos to cancer was mounting. Richard Doll, an epidemiologist at Turner and Newall, reported (in spite of company pressure) that people exposed to asbestos for 20 or more years had a 10 times higher risk of developing lung cancer than the general population. Also, a formerly rare and almost always fatal cancer, mesothelioma, was reported in epidemic proportions near asbestos mines in South Africa. In the 1960s, the British Journal of Industrial Medicine indicated that simply living near an asbestos factory, or in an asbestos-insulated building, increased mesothelioma risk.

Turner & Newall operated the factory until it closed in 1962, then sold the property to CertainTeed Corporation and Nicolet Industries. By 1973, the Environmental Protection Agency (EPA), began to restrict the use of asbestos, stopping the sale of insulation spray in 1973, and of solid asbestos insulation in 1975. In 1974, Nicolet held a competition, offering a $20,000 prize for the proposal of a "feasible commercial application" for its waste chalk piles. Nicolet filed for bankruptcy in 1987. By 1989, most remaining products were banned, under the 1989 Asbestos Ban and Phaseout Rule. Although the Ban was struck down in 1991, few asbestos-based products remain in the domestic marketplace.

Federal-Mogul, an American automotive supplier, purchased the remaining assets of Turner & Newall in 1998. As health concerns about asbestos became widely known, it too found itself in Chapter 11 bankruptcy due to asbestos liability.

=== Legacy of asbestos ===
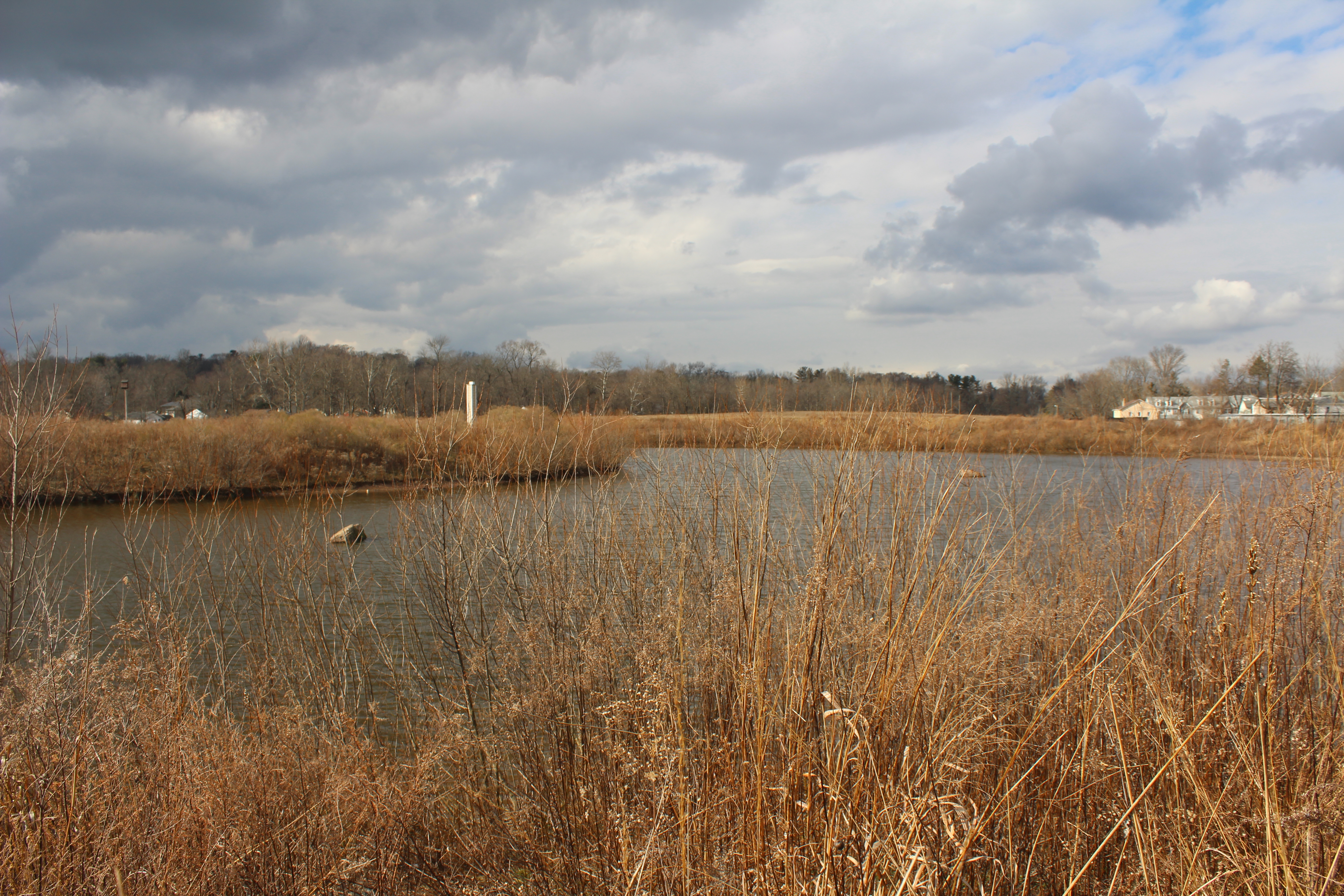
The reservoir parcel of the BoRit Asbestos Superfund Site was remediated and repurposed as the Wissahickon Waterfowl Preserve

A 2011 study by the Pennsylvania Department of Health reviewed data from 1992 to 2008, and reported that mesothelioma was diagnosed 3.1 times more often in Ambler residents than in other Pennsylvania residents. The higher rates were attributed to previous asbestos exposure in the factories.

In Ambler, where more than 1.5 million cubic yards of asbestos waste were discarded in a 25-acre area known as the "White Mountains", contamination remains an issue. From 1973 to 1993 the United States EPA oversaw remediation of the BoRit Asbestos waste dump, also known as the "Ambler Asbestos Piles". It was proposed to the National Priorities List (NPL) as a Superfund site on October 10, 1984, and formally added to the list as of June 10, 1986. Various remedies were completed as of August 30, 1993 and the site was consequently deleted from the National Priorities List on December 27, 1996, after remediation. The site is reviewed every five years by the EPA.

Local government has made redevelopment of the sites a priority. A 2005 proposal for a 17-story condominium tower was withdrawn after community opposition to the project. One of the concerns was asbestos waste at the location. In 2009 the Environmental Protection Agency (EPA) designated the proposed development as part of a second Superfund site, the BoRit Asbestos Site. The site includes an asbestos waste pile, an 11-acre pond and a former park. The EPA estimated that it would complete the initial cleanup phase at the BoRit site as of 2015.

In 2013, Heckendorn Shiles Architects and Summit Realty Advisers successfully converted the derelict factory and smokestack of the Keasbey & Mattison company into a LEED Platinum Certified multi-tenant office building, the Ambler Boiler House. The adaptive reuse project won support from the EPA's Brownfields Program and the EnergyWorks program. The renovations cost $16 million, and have resulted in a building with substantial green features including a grey-water system, geothermal energy, solar panels and a reflective roof system, and high-efficiency glass.

== Historic buildings ==
Dawesfield was added to the National Register of Historic Places in 1991. During the American Revolutionary War, "Dawesfield" was the property of James Morris, and was used by General George Washington as a headquarters from October 21 to November 20, 1777. James Morris also owned one of the mills in the Ambler area.

The Keasbey-Mattison houses are of interest in part because of the class differences revealed in the construction of different types of houses for workers, supervisors, and administrators, (not to mention Lindenwold Castle, home of Mattison himself.)

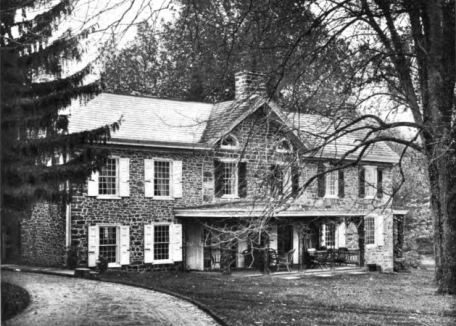
Dawesfield House, 1908

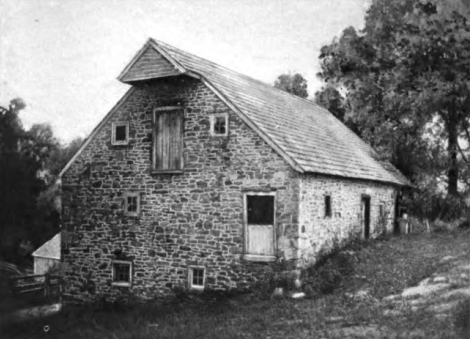
Mill belonging to James Morris, Montgomery County, PA, US, 1908

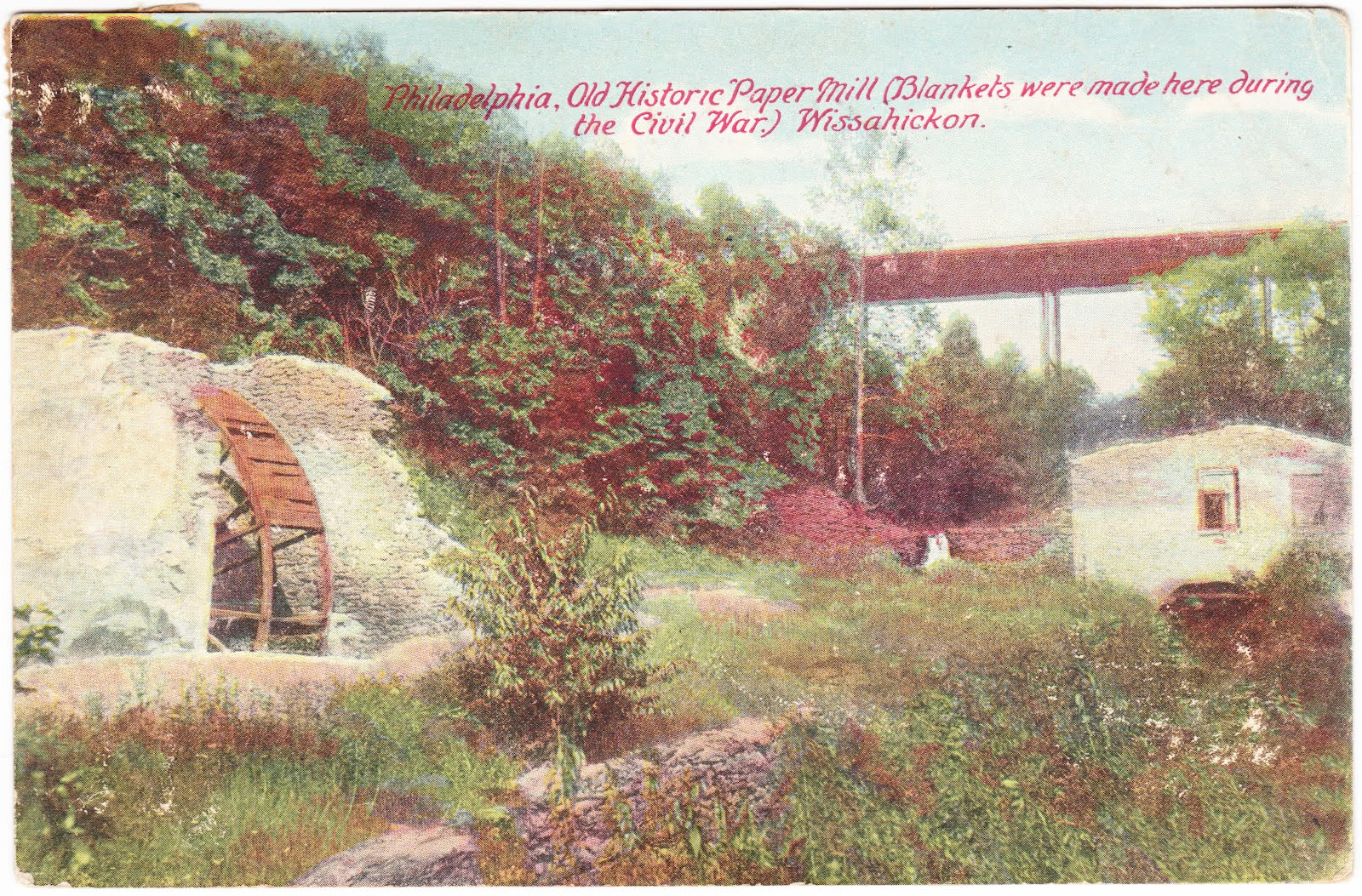
Remains of Paper Mill, Wissahickon Creek, 1908

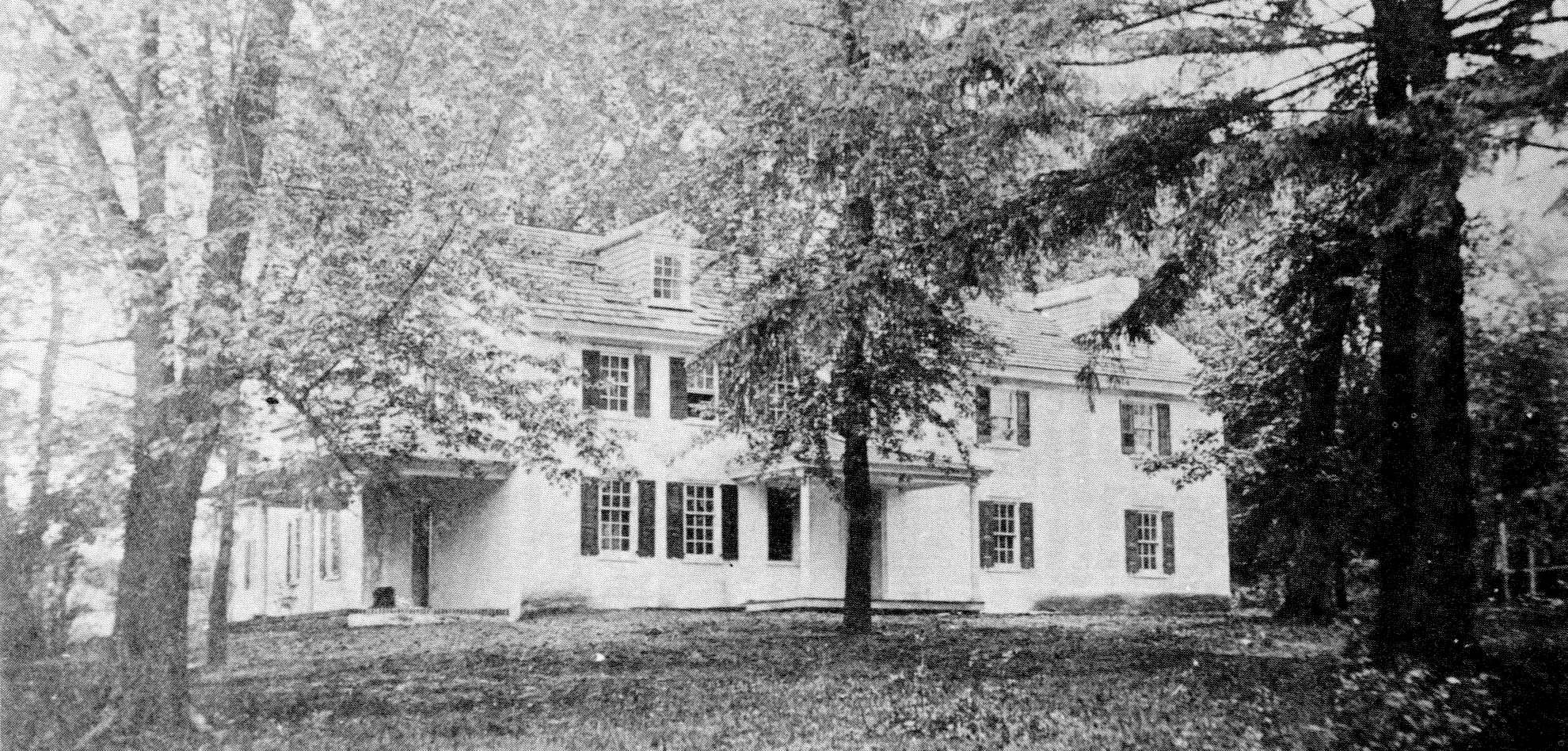
Mary Ambler homestead, c. 1936
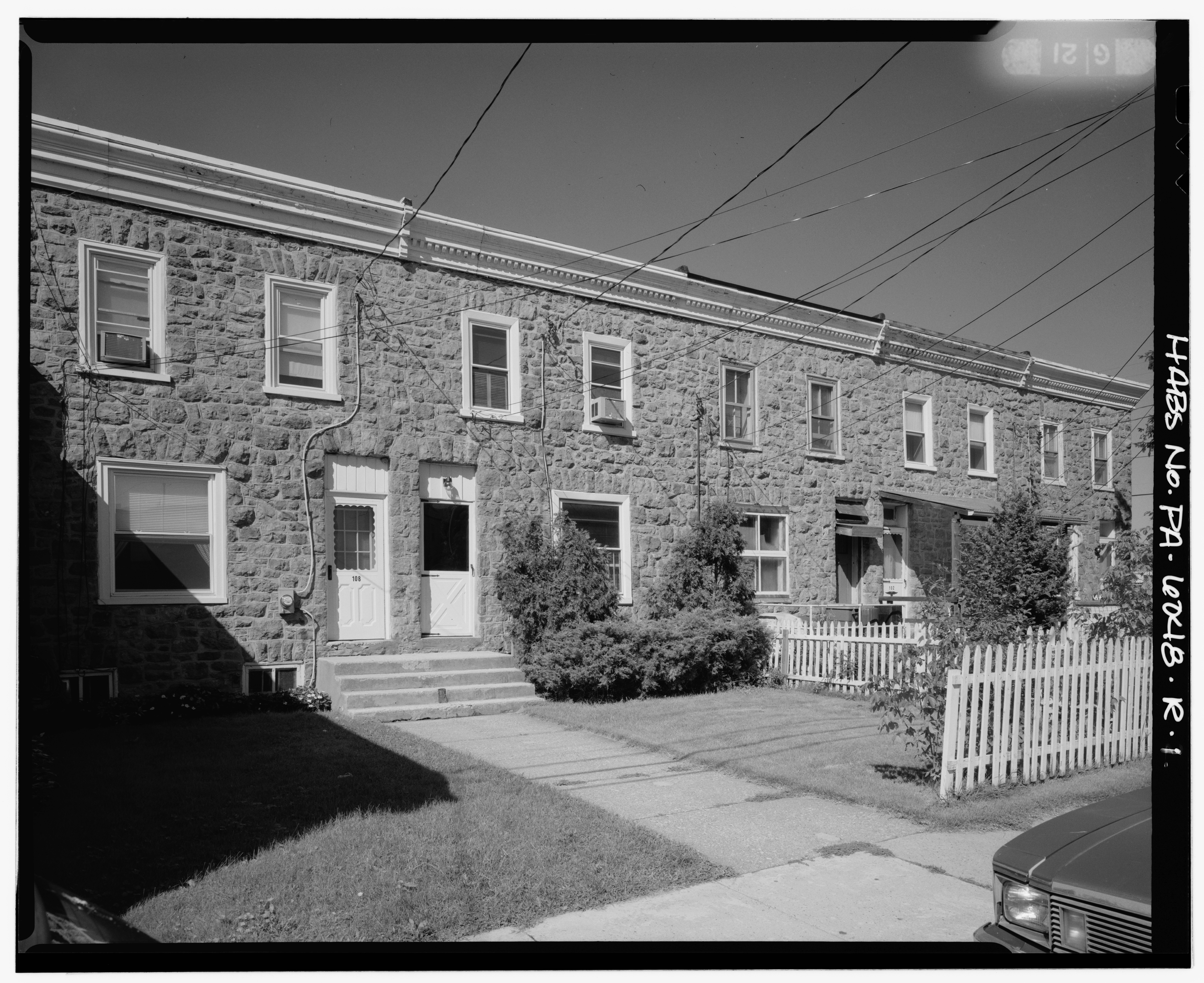
Workman's row houses

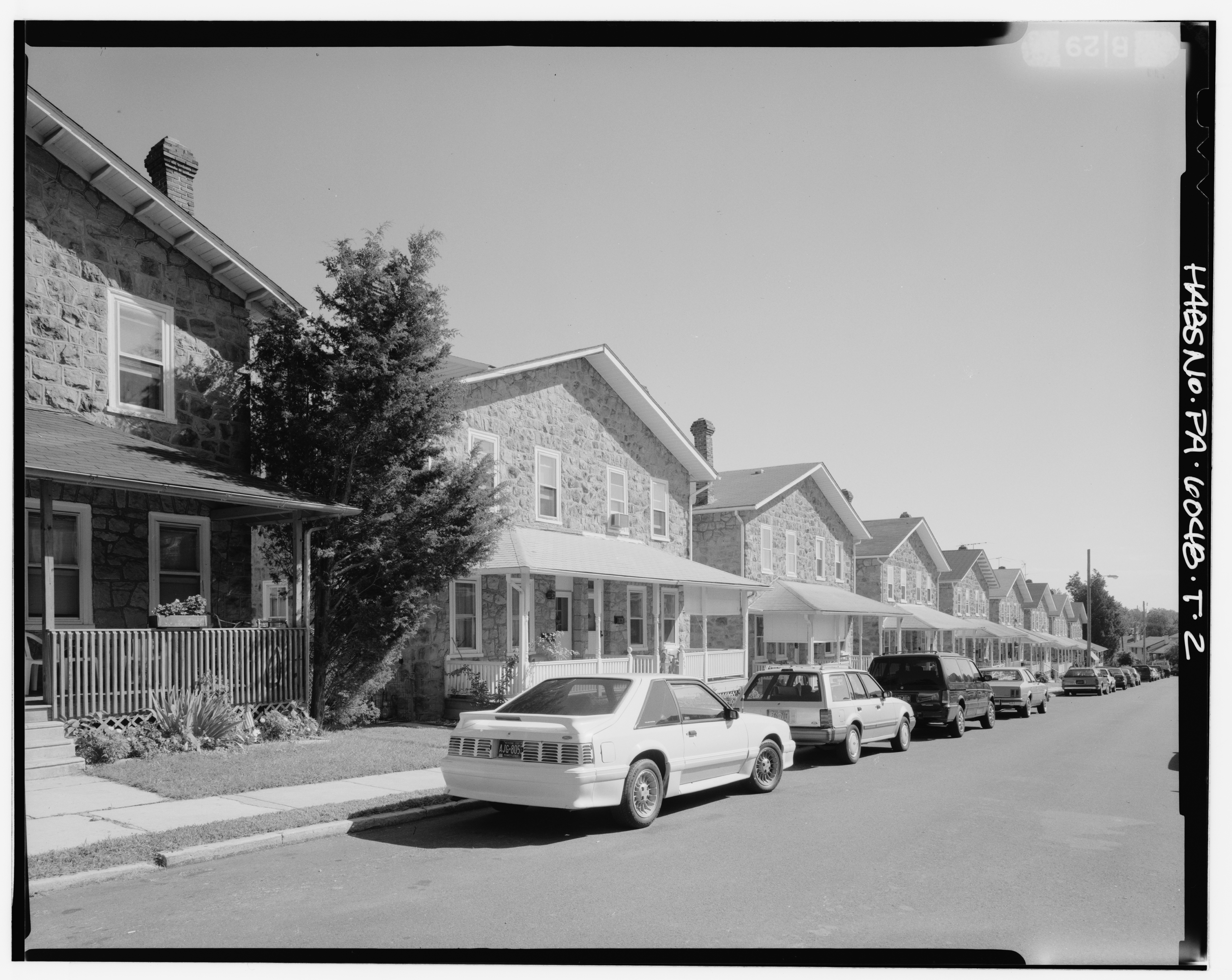
Workman's two-story houses

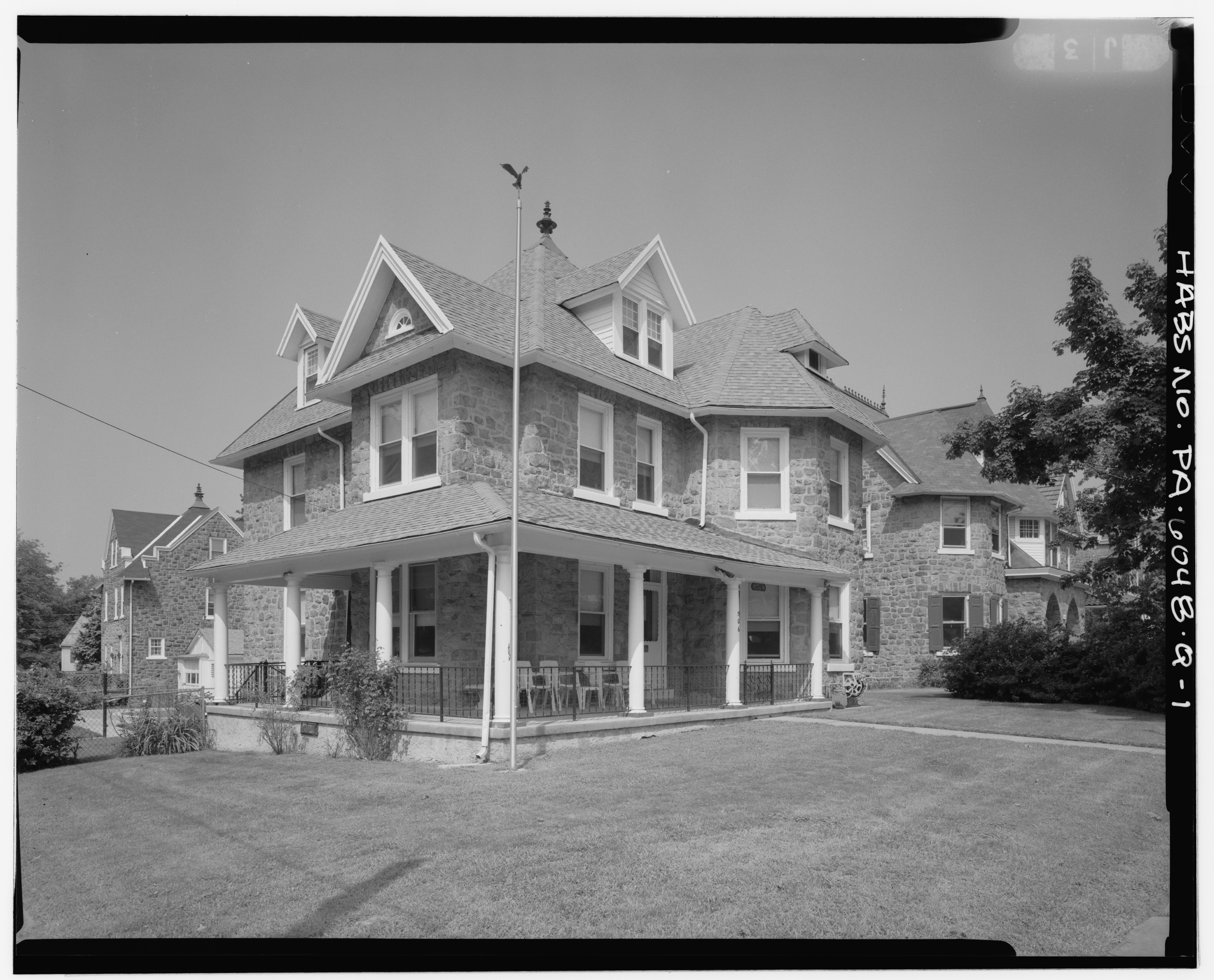
Supervisor's house

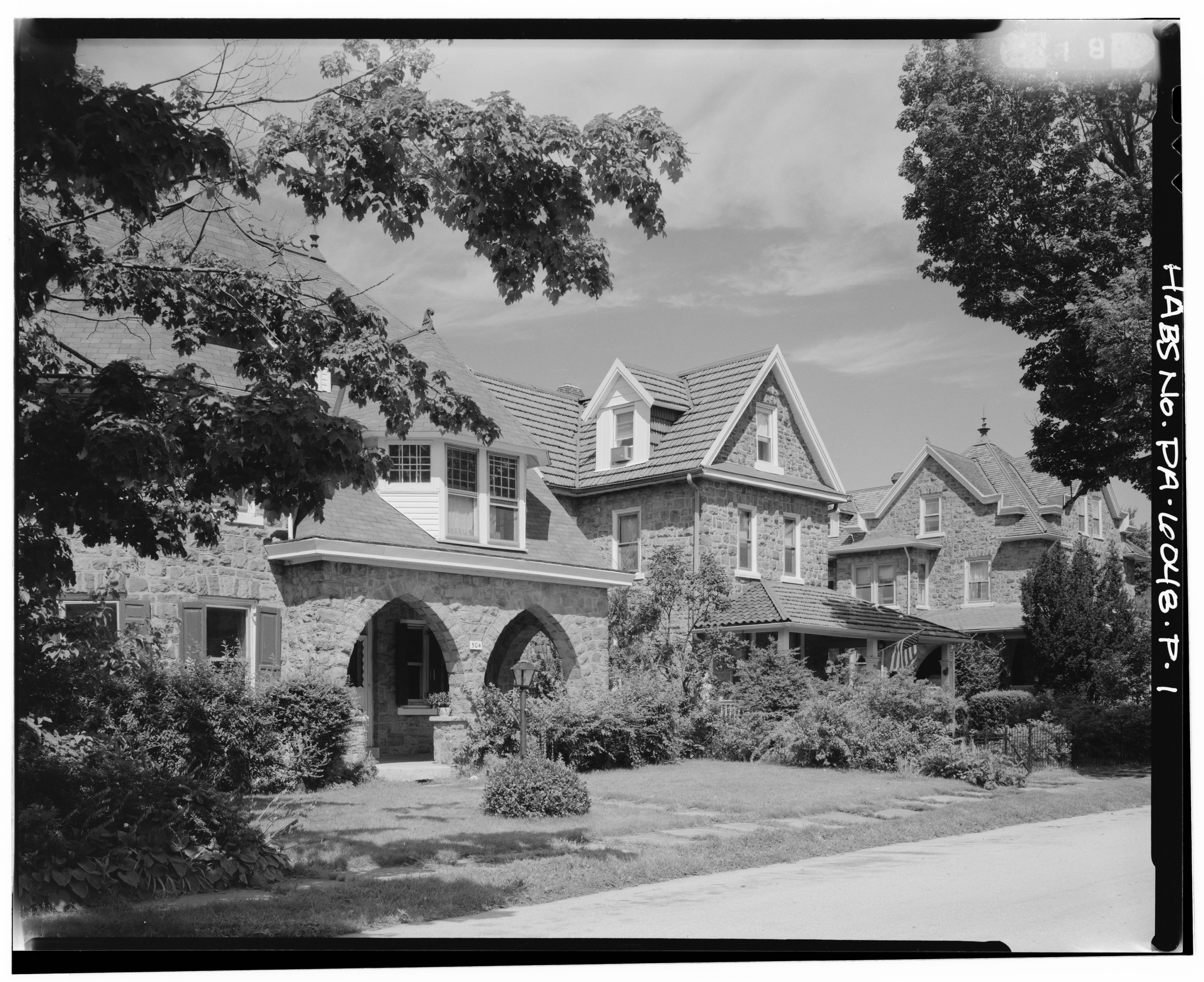
Supervisor's house

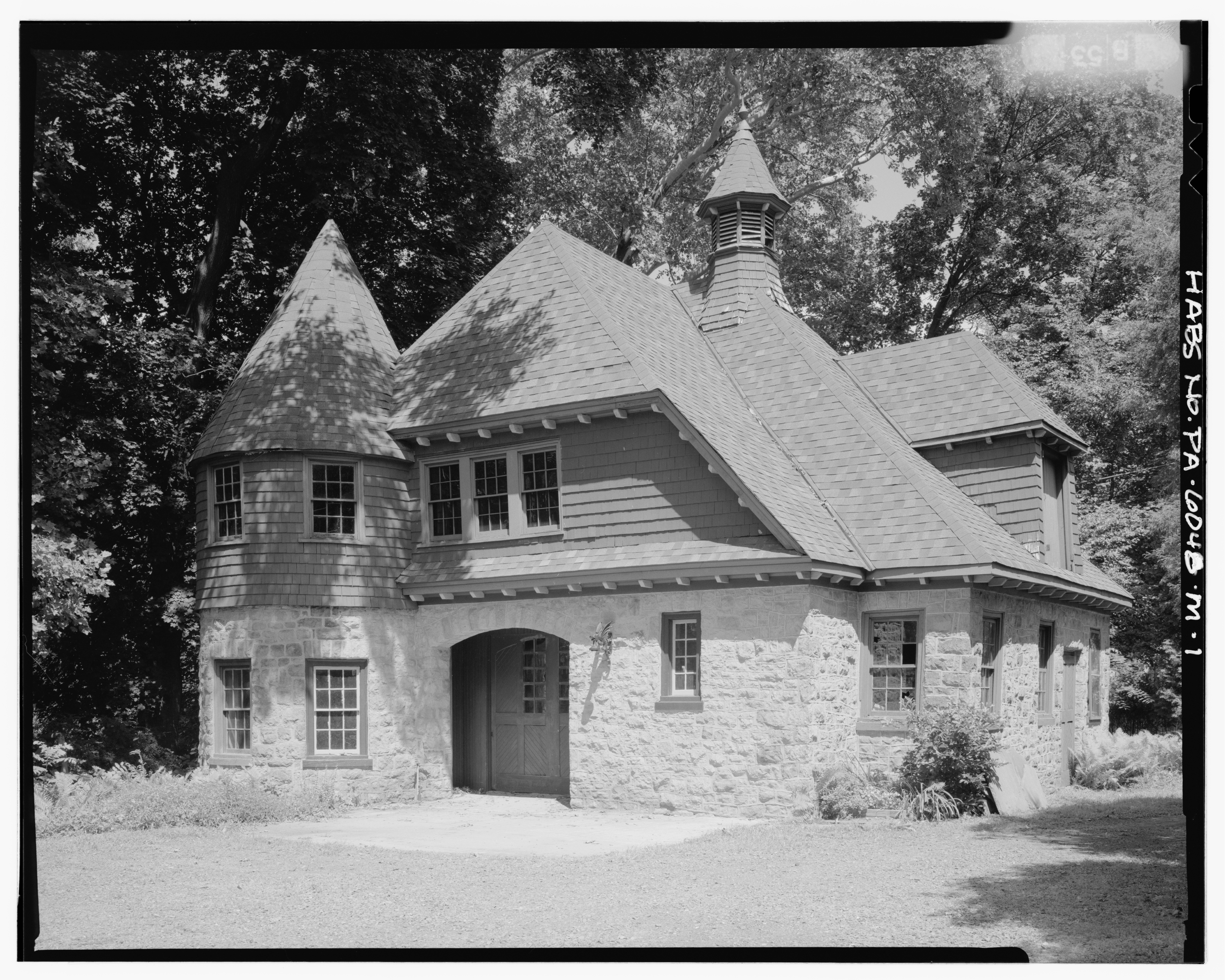
Victorian Executive's carriage house/barn

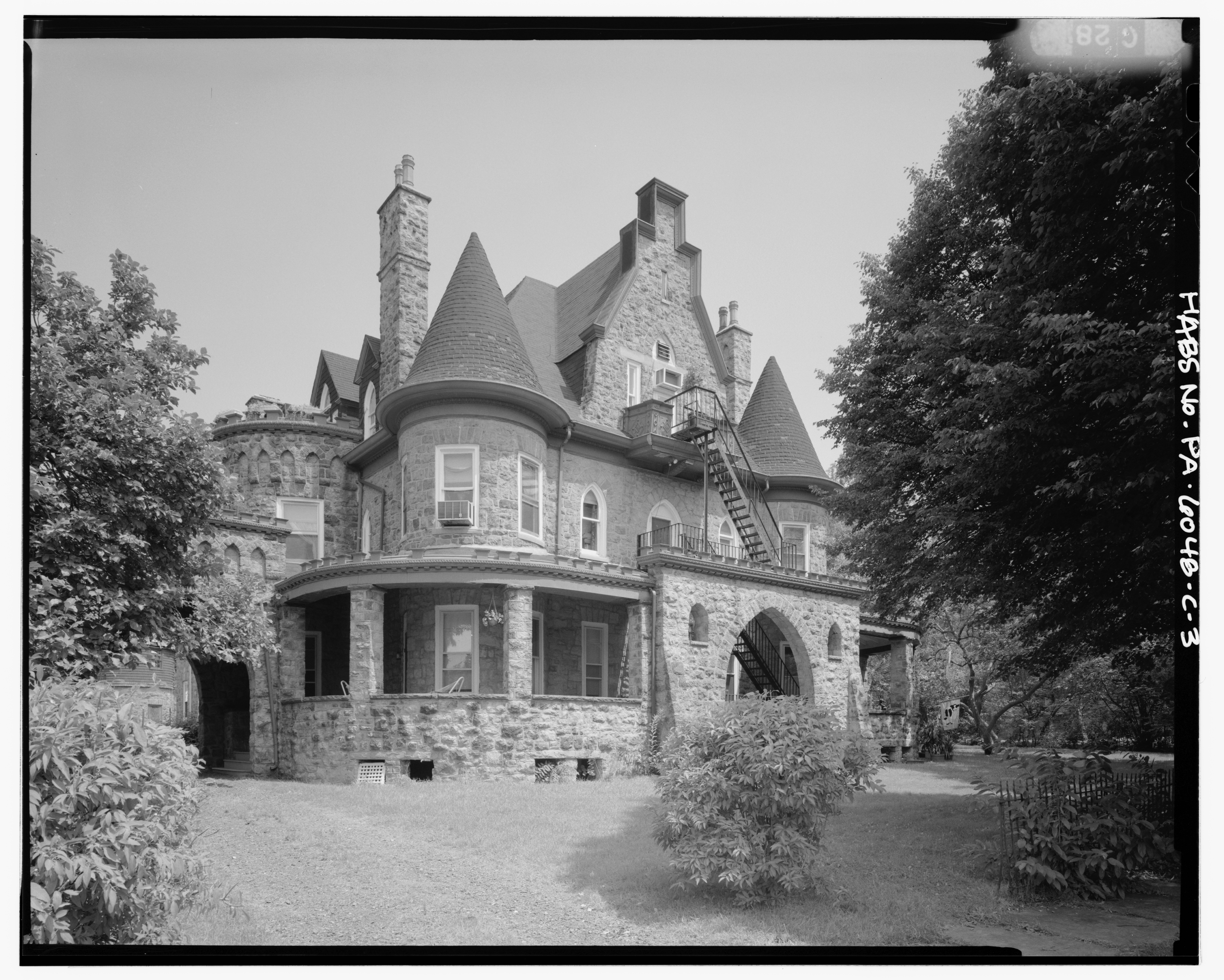
Victorian Executive's house

Other buildings of interest, some of which no longer exist, include:

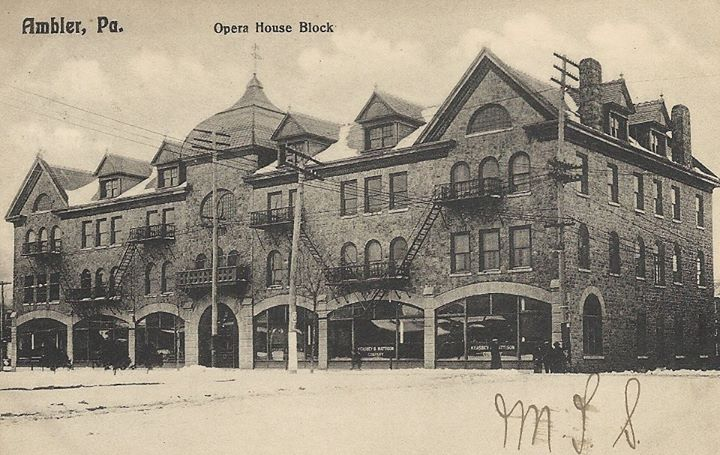
Opera House, 1906

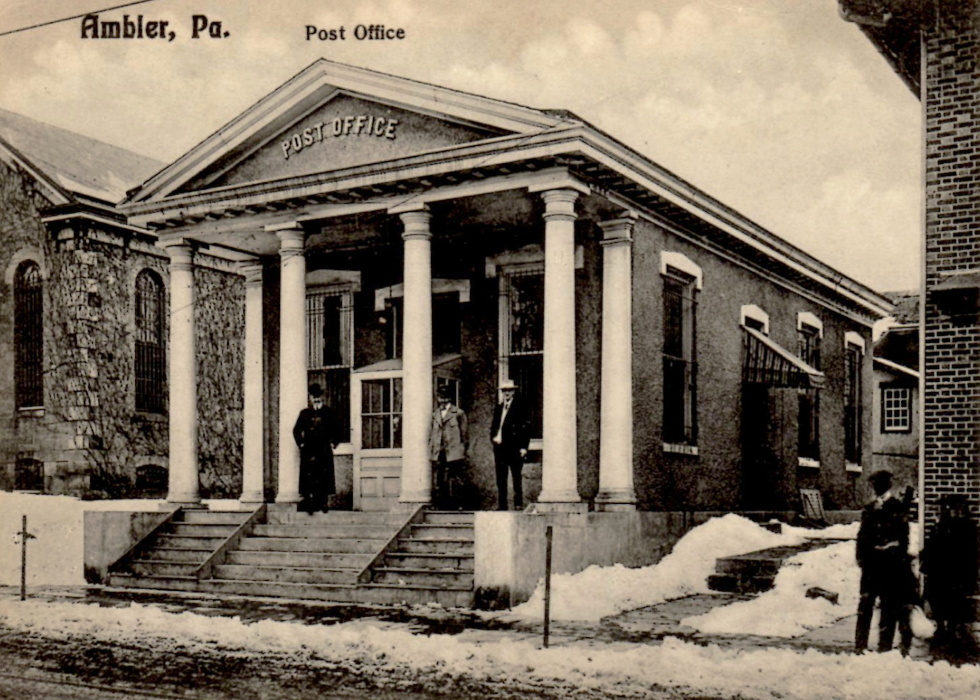
Post office, 1906

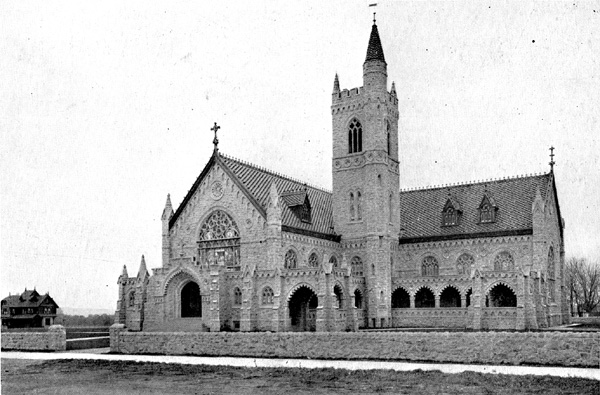
Trinity Memorial Episcopal Church, 1906

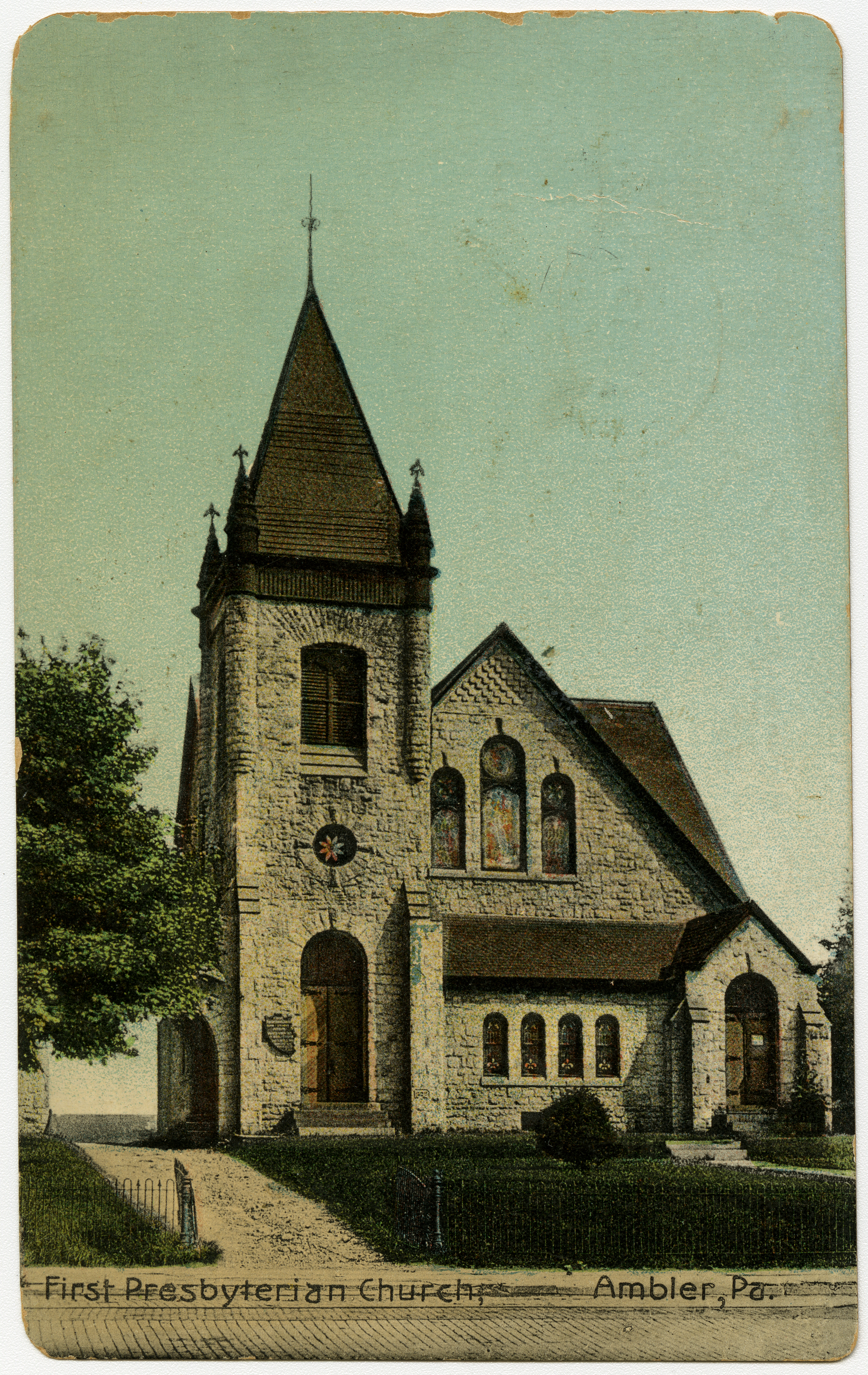
First Presbyterian Church of Ambler

== Geography ==
Ambler is located at 40°9′18″N 75°13′13″W (40.155099, -75.220160). According to the U.S. Census Bureau, the borough has a total area of 0.8 square miles (2.1 km^{2}), all land.

== Demographics ==
Historical population
Census	Pop.	Note	%±
1880	251		—
1890	1,073		327.5%
1900	1,884		75.6%
1910	2,649		40.6%
1920	3,094		16.8%
1930	3,944		27.5%
1940	3,953		0.2%
1950	4,565		15.5%
1960	6,765		48.2%
1970	7,800		15.3%
1980	6,628		−15.0%
1990	6,609		−0.3%
2000	6,426		−2.8%
2010	6,417		−0.1%
2020	6,807		6.1%

Presidential elections results
Year	Republican	Democratic
2020	27.6% 1,052	71.3% 2,717
2016	27.8% 904	67.2% 2,182
2012	31.2% 959	67.3% 2,069
2008	30.8% 947	68.4% 2,099
2004	33.7% 989	65.7% 1,927
2000	35.1% 875	60.4% 1,464

As of the 2010 census, the borough was 76.5% White, 12.8% Black or African American, 0.2% Native American, 3.8% Asian, 0.3% Native Hawaiian, and 3.4% were two or more races. 7.9% were of Hispanic or Latino ancestry, an almost four-fold increase since the 2000 census .

As of the census of 2000, there were 6,426 people, 2,510 households, and 1,598 families residing in the borough. The population density was 7,605.8 inhabitants per square mile (2,936.6/km^{2}). There were 2,605 housing units at an average density of 3,083.3 per square mile (1,190.5/km^{2}). The racial makeup of the borough was 83.29% White, 12.03% African American, 0.25% Native American, 2.47% Asian, 0.06% Pacific Islander, 0.50% from other races, and 1.40% from two or more races. Hispanic or Latino of any race were 2.13% of the population.

There were 2,510 households, out of which 29.9% had children under the age of 18 living with them, 45.7% were married couples living together, 13.9% had a female householder with no husband present, and 36.3% were non-families. 30.2% of all households were made up of individuals, and 11.2% had someone living alone who was 65 years of age or older. The average household size was 2.45 and the average family size was 3.08.

In the borough the population was spread out, with 23.5% under the age of 18, 7.0% from 18 to 24, 32.5% from 25 to 44, 19.7% from 45 to 64, and 17.4% who were 65 years of age or older. The median age was 37 years. For every 100 females there were 86.5 males. For every 100 females age 18 and over, there were 81.8 males.

The median income for a household in the borough was $47,014, and the median income for a family was $51,235. Males had a median income of $40,305 versus $30,735 for females. The per capita income for the borough was $21,688. About 2.4% of families and 5.5% of the population were below the poverty line, including 6.8% of those under age 18 and 4.9% of those age 65 or over.

== Politics and government ==
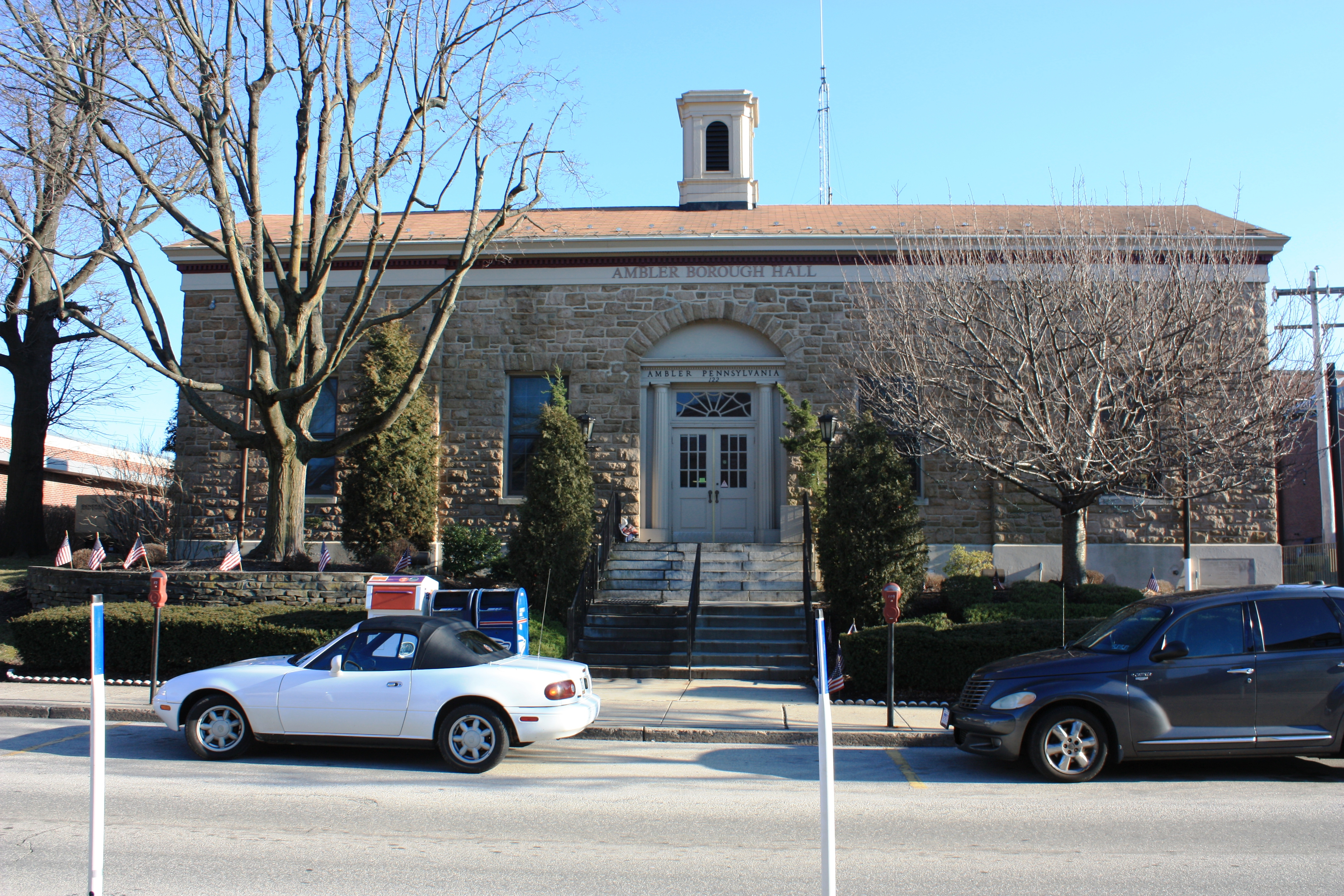
The then-current Ambler Borough Hall in 2012

Ambler has a city manager form of government with a mayor and a nine-member borough council. The mayor is Jeanne Sorg. The borough is part of the Fourth Congressional District (represented by Rep. Madeleine Dean), the 151st State House District (represented by Representative Melissa Cerrato) and the 12th State Senate District (represented by Sen. Maria Collett).

== Education ==
Ambler is served by the Wissahickon School District (WSD). In 2004, the Wissahickon School District had 4,535 students. Wissahickon School District has six schools: four elementary, one middle (grades 6-8) and one high school (grades 9-12). The zoned elementary schools for sections of Ambler are Lower Gwynedd Elementary School and Shady Grove Elementary School.

Mattison Avenue Elementary School was formerly in Ambler. In 1975 someone had proposed combining grades 2-3, but the school board that year canceled the proposal. The school closed in 2013, and its territory was divided between Lower Gwynedd and Shady Grove elementary schools. The WSD Head Start, formerly in the Mattison Avenue school, continued to operate, but had to move somewhere else. In 2015 the Ambler borough hall began to occupy the former school.

There was an Ambler Junior High School. It closed by 1975. That year there was a controversy on how the school should be rezoned. A company wanted to have apartment units installed in the former junior high school property, while some members of the city council opposed this. The Reporter of Lansdale, Pennsylvania argued that the development proposals should be known to the public.

There was previously another elementary school, Forest Avenue Elementary School in Ambler. By 1976 it had closed, with the district no longer using the property and leaving it unmaintained. The Senior Adults for Greater Adventure (SAGA) organization operated its Ambler center in that facility.

There is an area Catholic grade school, Our Lady of Mercy Regional Catholic School, in Maple Glen. Our Lady of Mercy was formed in 2012 by the merger of St. Anthony-St. Joseph in Ambler, St. Alphonsus in Maple Glen, and St. Catherine of Siena in Horsham.

Temple University, whose main campus is in nearby urban Philadelphia, has a suburban campus that is referred to as the Ambler Campus. The main contact address for the campus has an Ambler postal address, 580 Meetinghouse Road, Ambler, PA 19002. However, it is technically outside the borough limits, in Upper Dublin Township, and is in the purview of the Upper Dublin Township Police. Temple University Ambler was founded in 1910 as the Pennsylvania School of Horticulture for Women. It offers an array of undergraduate, graduate, and non-credit programs.

== Arts and culture ==
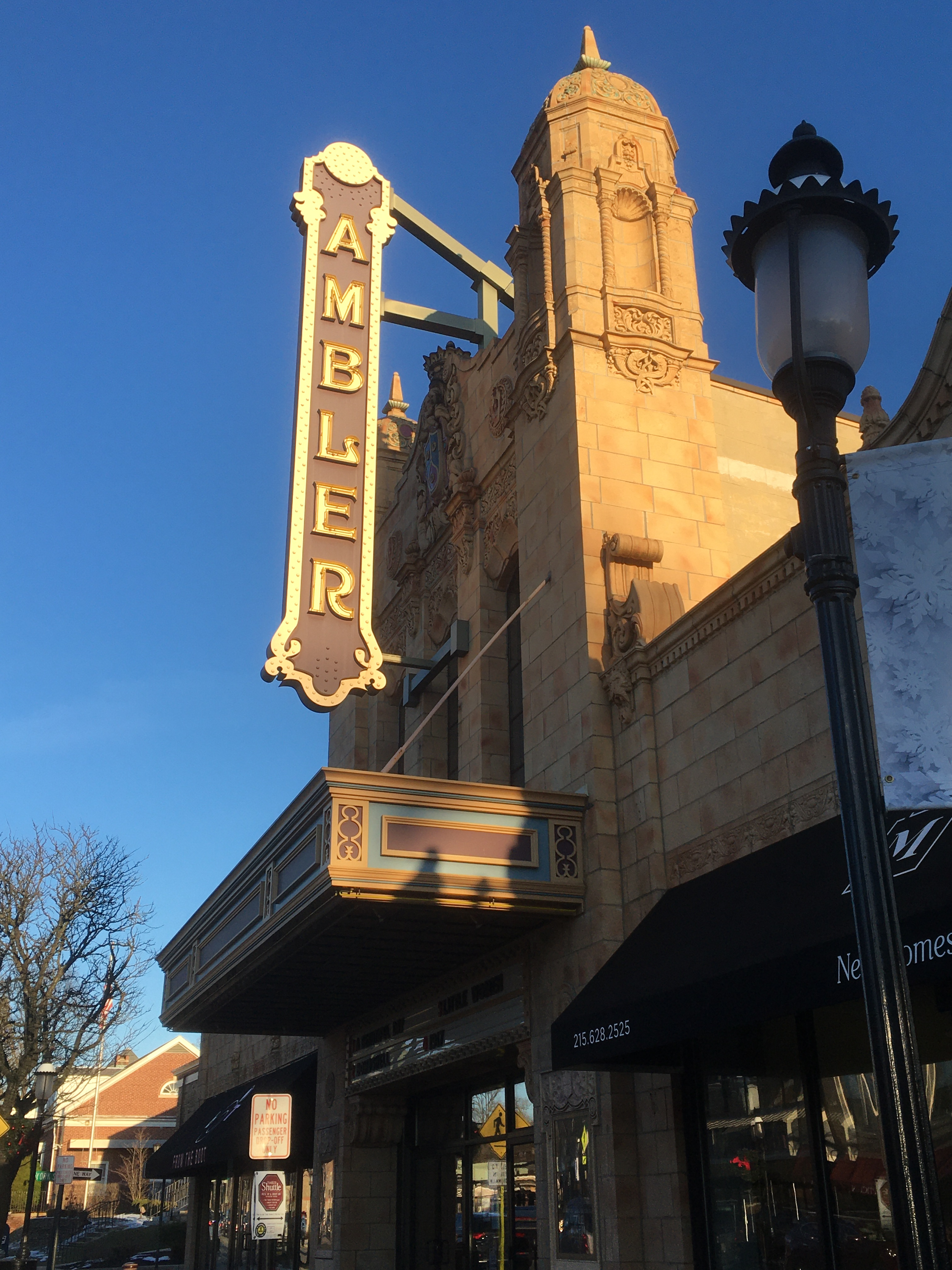
Ambler Theater

=== Act II Playhouse ===
Act II Playhouse is a 130-seat professional theatre founded in 1998. Act II has been nominated for 31 Barrymore Awards and has won six.

=== Ambler Symphony Orchestra ===
Founded in 1951, the Ambler Symphony Orchestra currently performs several concerts per year under the musical direction of WRTI program director Jack Moore.

=== Ambler Theater ===
Originally opened in 1928 as a Warner Brothers movie theater, the recently restored and renovated Ambler Theater is a non-profit, community owned movie theater that shows independent, art and limited-distribution films.

=== Post office ===
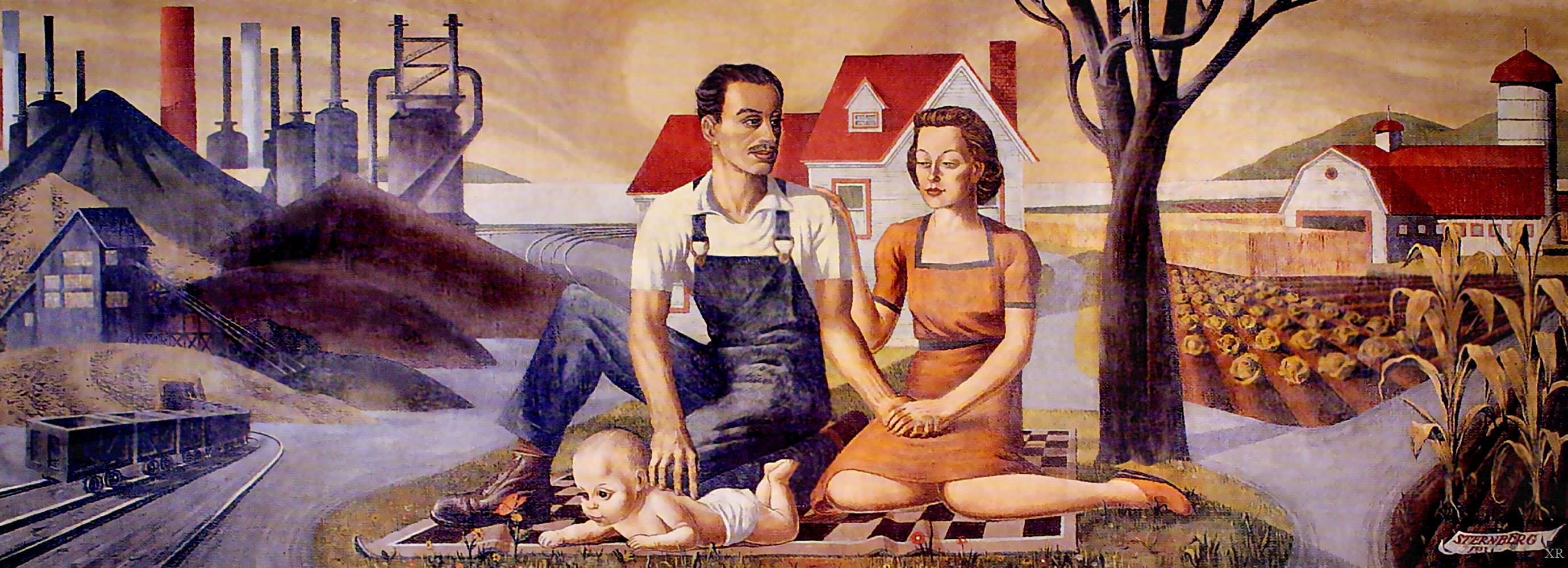
The Family, Industry and Agriculture, a 1939 Works Progress Administration mural by Harry Sternberg in the old post office

Post office murals were produced from 1934 to 1943 in the United States through the Section of Painting and Sculpture, later called the Section of Fine Arts, of the Treasury Department. The murals were intended to boost the morale of the American people from the effects of the Depression by depicting uplifting subjects. The murals were funded as a part of the cost of the construction or renovation with 1% of the cost set aside for artistic enhancements. In 1939, artist Harry Sternberg completed the mural The Family, Industry and Architecture for the town's post office. The artist and his family are the main figures in the painting.

=== Notable people ===
- Kathleen "Kay" McNulty Mauchly Antonelli - an Irish computer programmer and one of the six original programmers of the ENIAC, one of the first general-purpose electronic digital computers.
- John Di Domenico - Comedian, actor, and writer
- Martin Kilson - an American political scientist. He was the first black academic to be appointed a full professor at Harvard University
- Tanoh Kpassagnon - American football defensive end for the New Orleans Saints of the National Football League (NFL)
- John Dallas Cecil Ford - an American Negro league pitcher in the 1910s.
- Michael F. "Mike" Gerber - a former Democratic member of the Pennsylvania House of Representatives, representing the 148th Legislative District from 2005 to 2012.
- Elwood Lewis Richie - a professional baseball player who played pitcher in the Major Leagues from 1906 to 1913. He would play for the Chicago Cubs, Boston Doves and Philadelphia Phillies.
- Curtis Thomas Simmons - an American former professional baseball left-handed pitcher, who played in Major League Baseball (MLB) from 1947 to 1950 and 1952 to 1967.
- David J. Sloane - an American former professional ice hockey defenseman. He played in one National Hockey League (NHL) game with the Philadelphia Flyers during the 2008–09 season.
- Ruth Williams - a pitcher who played from 1946 through 1953 in the All-American Girls Professional Baseball League.

== Transportation ==
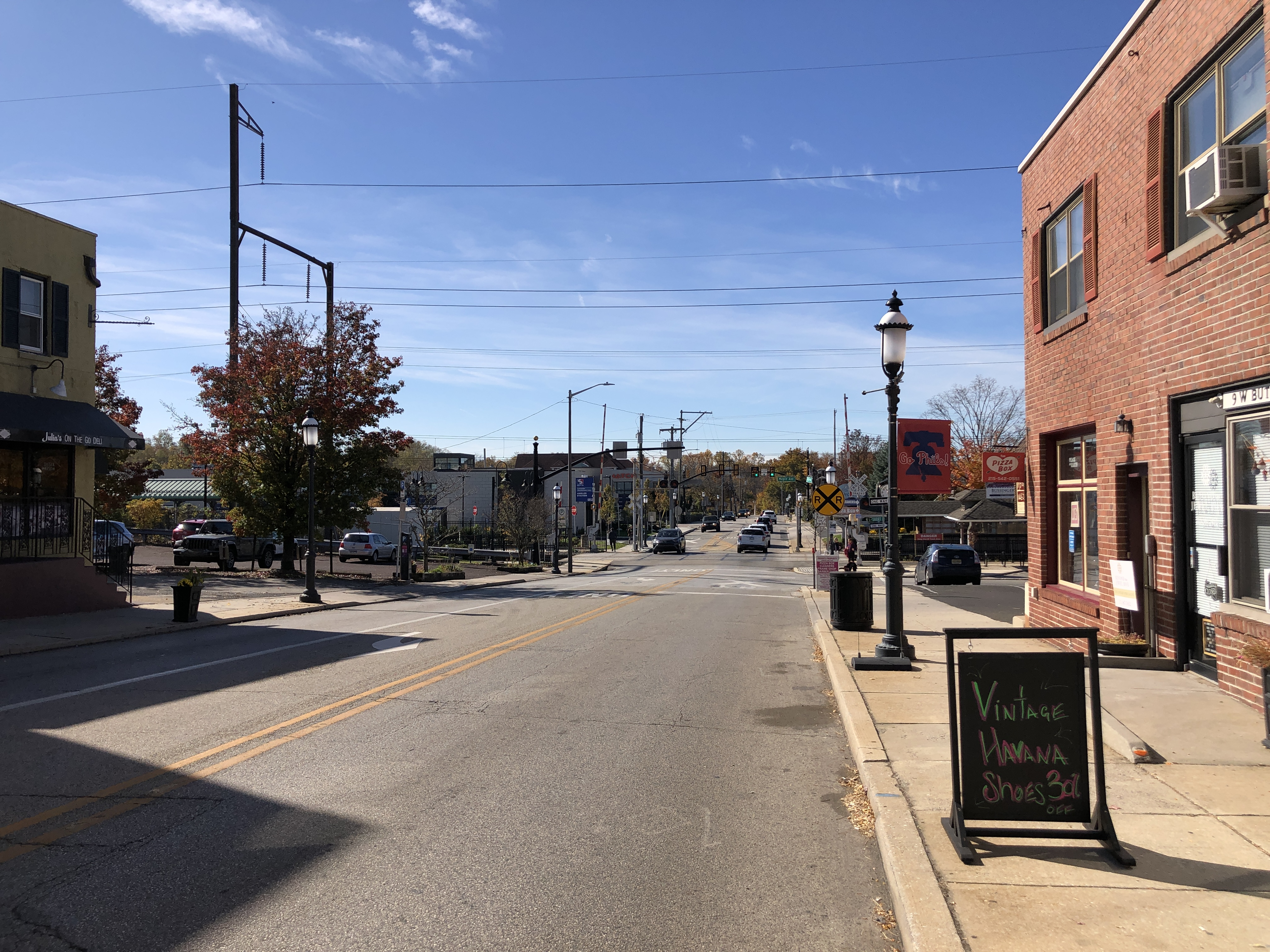
Butler Avenue in Ambler

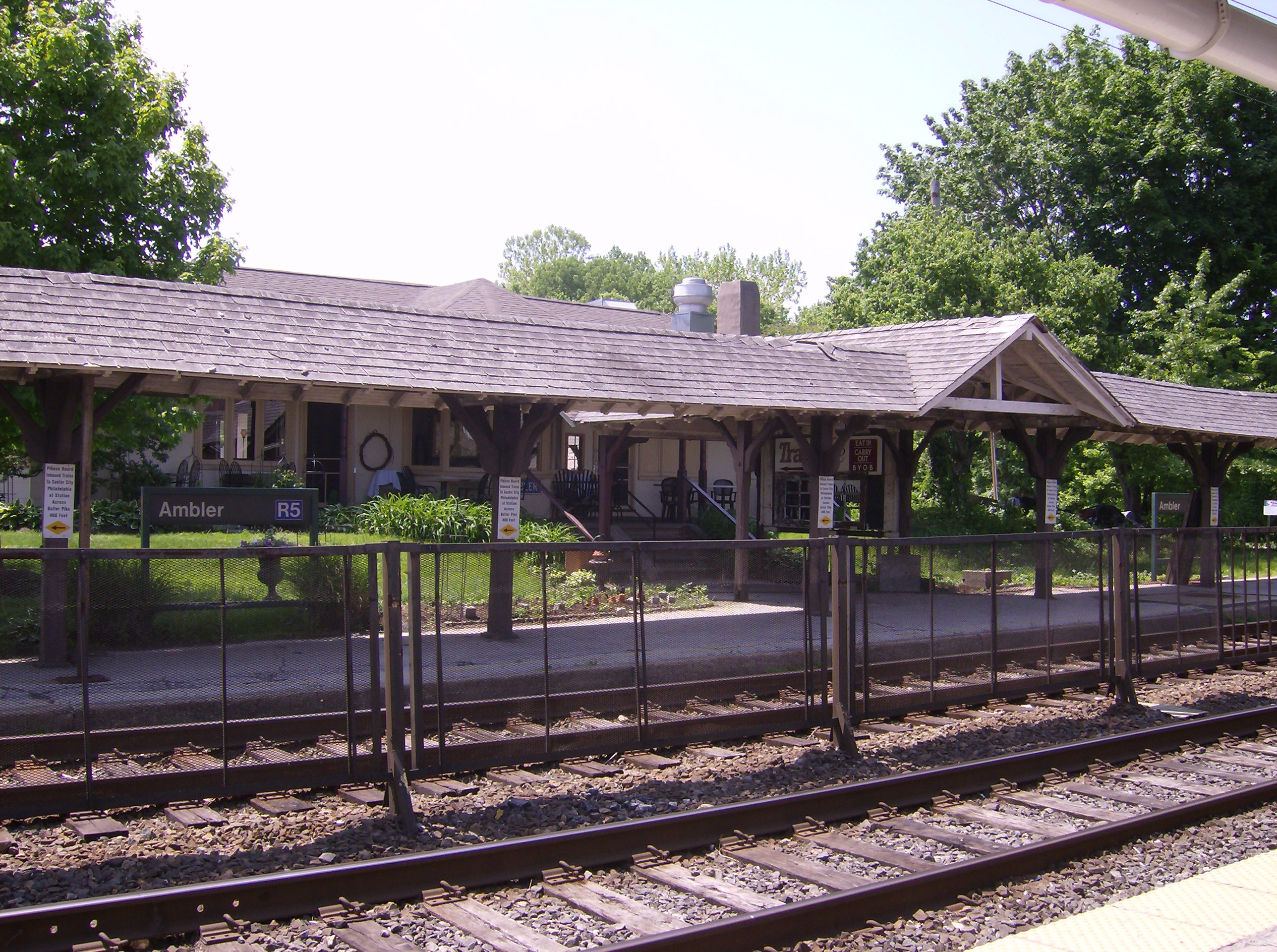
Ambler station with restaurant Trax behind it

As of 2018, there were 15.72 miles (25.30 km) of public roads in Ambler, of which 0.98 miles (1.58 km) were maintained by Pennsylvania Department of Transportation (PennDOT) and 14.74 miles (23.72 km) were maintained by the borough.

Butler Avenue serves as the main street through Ambler, with the road known as Butler Pike outside the borough. Butler Pike heads southwest to Plymouth Meeting and northeast to Horsham Township. Bethlehem Pike runs along the eastern border of Ambler and heads north to Montgomeryville and south to Philadelphia. Pennsylvania Route 309 passes to the east of Ambler on a freeway called the Fort Washington Expressway, with access to Ambler at a southbound exit and northbound entrance at Butler Pike and a northbound exit and southbound entrance at Susquehanna Road. The Pennsylvania Turnpike (Interstate 276) has an interchange with PA 309 south of Ambler in Fort Washington.

Ambler is served by SEPTA Regional Rail's Lansdale/Doylestown Line, which provides service to Center City Philadelphia, Lansdale, Doylestown, and other intermediate points, at Ambler station, which is a major park-and-ride facility on the line. SEPTA Suburban Division bus routes 94 and 95 also serve Ambler, with Route 94 connecting Ambler to the Chestnut Hill section of Philadelphia and the Montgomery Mall and Route 95 connecting Ambler to Willow Grove and Gulph Mills.

== Sister city ==
Ambler is a sister city with:

- Maida, Calabria, Italy
