= Gilkison's Corner, Pennsylvania =

Gilkison's Corner
- Unincorporated community
- Location of Gilkison's Corner in Pennsylvania Gilkison's Corner (the United States)
- Coordinates: 40°09′34″N 75°12′53.83″W
- Country: United States
- State: Pennsylvania
- County: Montgomery
- Township: Upper Dublin
- Elevation: 239 ft (73 m)
- Time zone: UTC-5 (EST)
  - Summer (DST): UTC-4 (EDT)
- Area codes: 215, 267 and 445

Gilkison's Corner was a small hamlet located in Montgomery County, Pennsylvania, in the United States. The community was in Upper Dublin Township, at the intersection of Butler Pike and Bethlehem Pike.

The term is primarily archaic in usage, and the location does not appear on modern maps. Usage of the term appears to have declined towards the end of the 19th century, around the time of the establishment of the more heavily populated Borough of Ambler, whose eastern border is located along Bethlehem Pike.

Located at the intersection of two heavily travelled early roads, Gilkison's Corner was the location of a Revolutionary War-era tavern. A large tannery was established just south of Gilkison's Corner in the 1850s, and Upper Dublin's post office was located in Gilkison's Corner until 1827.

Bean's 1884 History of Montgomery County, Pennsylvania describes Gilkison's Corner as follows:

Gilkison's Corner is situated at the intersection of the Spring House and Butler road turnpikes. It contains a store, six or seven houses and the extensive steam tannery of Alvin D. Foust, established some thirty years ago. It was at this place where Andrew Gilkison kept a tavern in the Revolution and for some years thereafter. The Upper Dublin post-office was located here before 1827, but has been removed half a mile distant ... At the present Gilkison's Corner, on the Bethlehem turnpike, Andrew Gilkison kept an inn from 1779 to 1786, and most probably later; hence the name of the place. This was on the store property now owned by David Dunnet. About a quarter of a mile above this place was a tavern formerly kept by Benjamin Daves. Paul Bower kept an inn in 1774, and Susanna Wright in 1779, which we are at present unable to locate, but very probably in this vicinity.
