= Upper Dublin Township, Pennsylvania =

Township in Pennsylvania, US

Upper Dublin
- Township
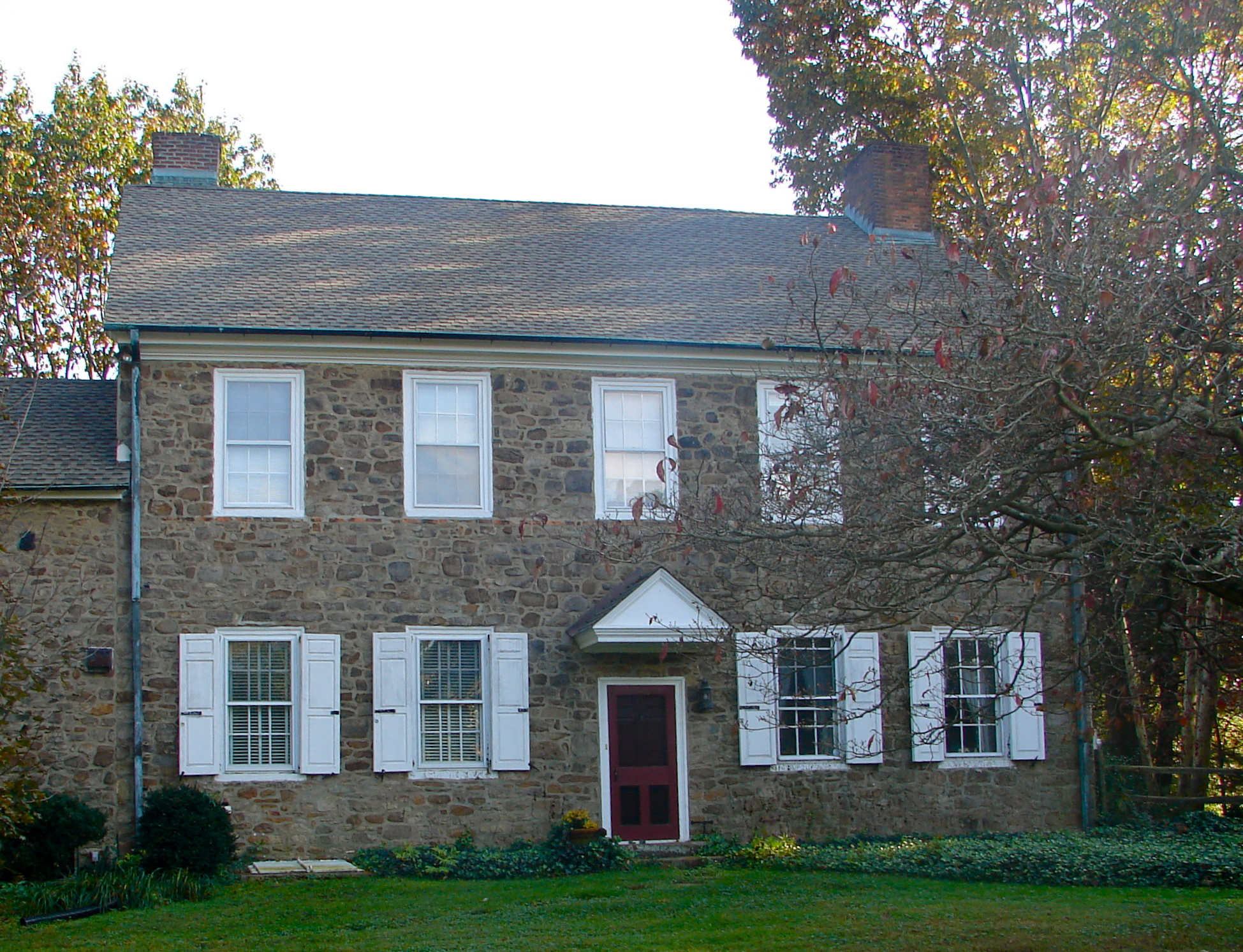
- Quaker Manor House

- Seal

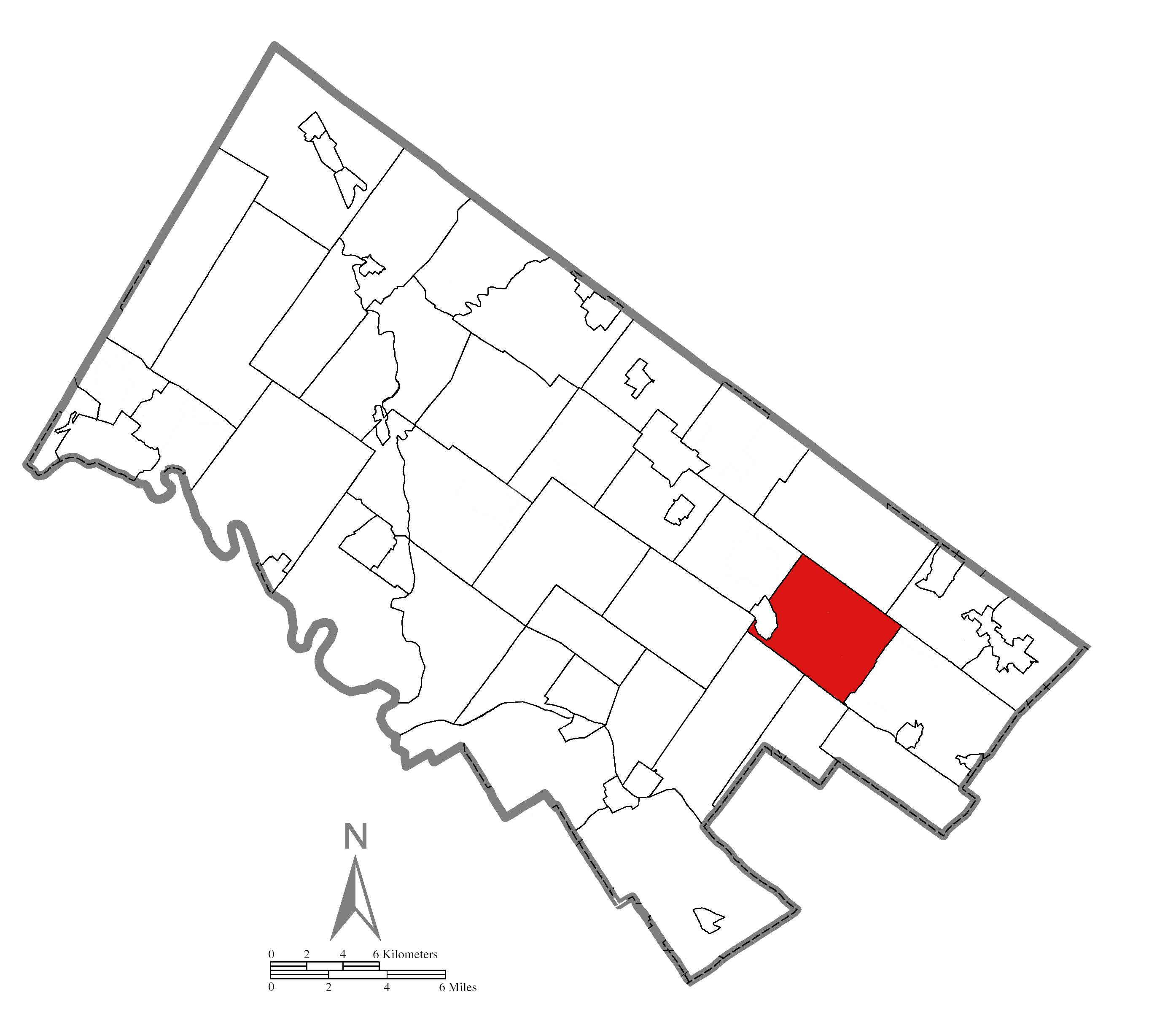
- Location of Upper Dublin in Montgomery County, Pennsylvania
- Coordinates: 40°07′29″N 75°09′59″W
- Country: United States
- State: Pennsylvania
- County: Montgomery
- Purchased: 1684

Government
  - President Board of Commissioners: Ira S. Tackel

Area
  - Total: 13.26 sq mi (34.3 km^{2})
  - Land: 13.23 sq mi (34.3 km^{2})
  - Water: 0.03 sq mi (0.078 km^{2})
- Elevation: 230 ft (70 m)

Population (2020)
  - Total: 26,665
  - Density: 2,015/sq mi (778.2/km^{2})
- Time zone: UTC-5 (EST)
  - Summer (DST): UTC-4 (EDT)
- ZIP Code: 19001, 19002, 19025, 19034, 19038, 19075, 19090
- Area codes: 215, 267, 445
- FIPS code: 42-091-79008
- Website: upperdublin.net

Upper Dublin Township is an affluent township in Montgomery County, Pennsylvania, United States. The population was 26,665 at the 2020 census. Until the 1950s, Upper Dublin was mostly farmland and open space, but transitioned to a residential suburb during the postwar population boom. The population went from just over 6,000 residents in the 1950s to just under 20,000 by 1970. Today, Upper Dublin is mostly spread-out development housing, and has the fourth highest median income in Montgomery County.

Upper Dublin is made up of several community areas, many of which are unincorporated areas in Montgomery County with no legal status, and are used primarily by the US Postal Service. These community areas are portions of Ambler (19002) (excluding the Borough of Ambler), Dresher (19025), Fort Washington (19034), Jarrettown (19025), Maple Glen (19002), and small portions of Abington (19001), Ardsley (19038), North Hills (19038), Oreland (19075), and Willow Grove (19090).

== History ==
=== Founding ===
Edward Tanner was granted land by William Penn in the Province of Pennsylvania and named it "Upper and Lower Dublin." Lower Dublin was incorporated into the City of Philadelphia following the passage of the Act of Consolidation in 1854. The "upper" portion has continued to exist around the original survey for the laying out and naming of Susquehanna Road. Upper Dublin Township was established in 1701, when William Penn ordered a survey of all townships in the Commonwealth. It was first settled in 1698, and incorporated in 1719. The township was granted its current status of First Class Township in the Commonwealth of Pennsylvania on January 1, 1946. Originally the area started as a farming community with additional activity in the mining of limestone. Limekiln Pike today continues to be an important travel artery.

=== American Revolutionary War ===
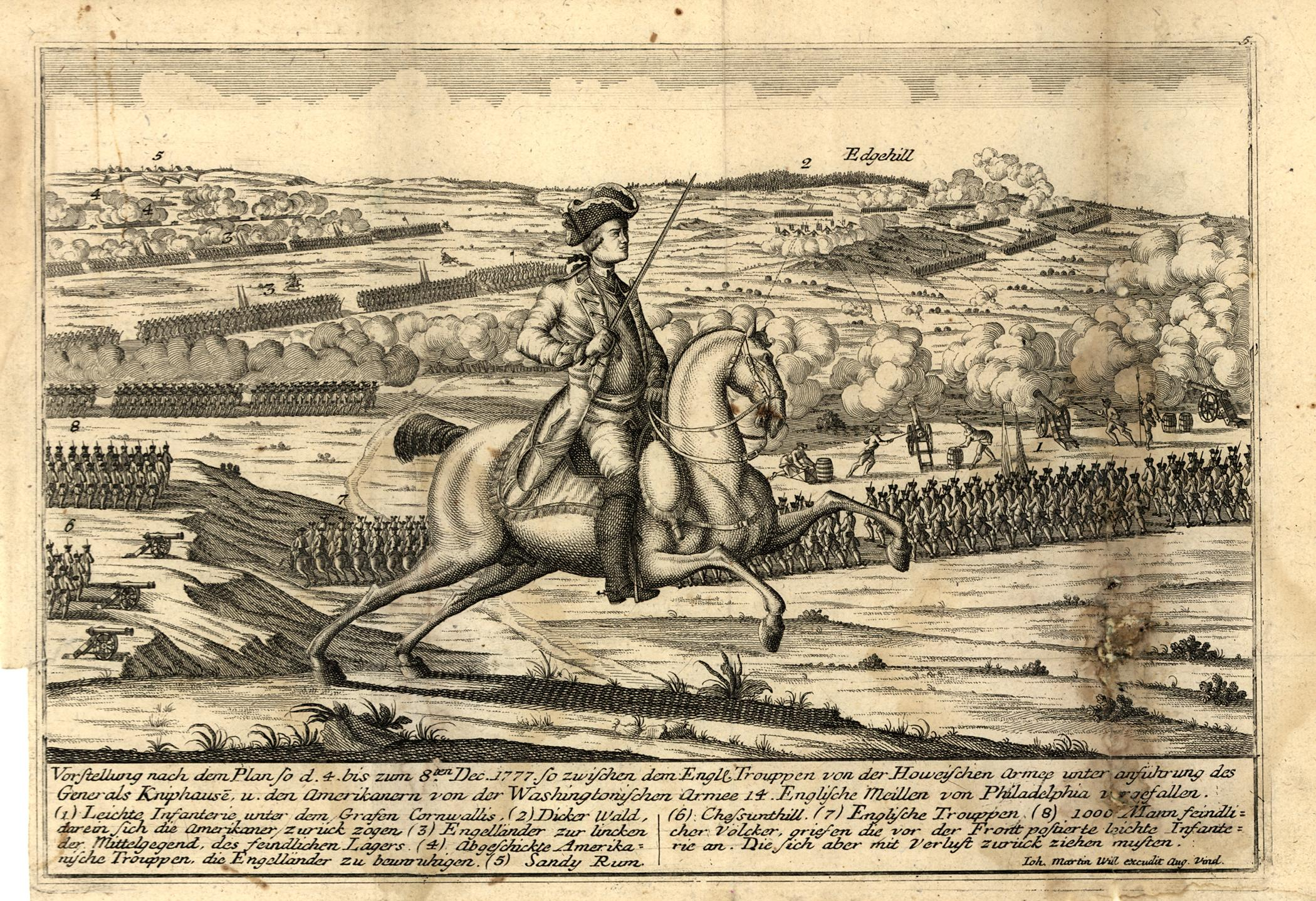
Engraving of the Battle of White Marsh

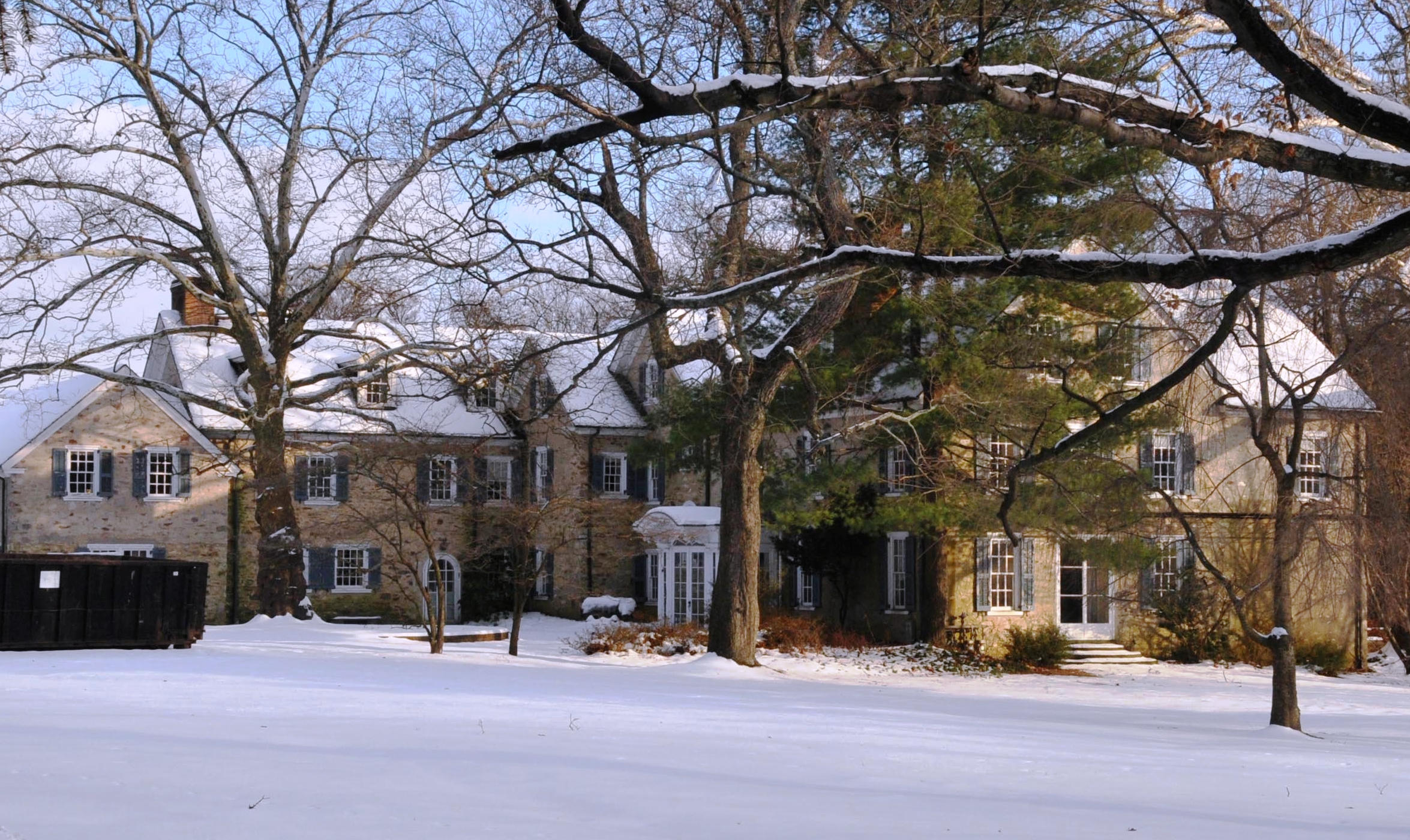
Emlen House, George Washington's headquarters from November 2 to December 11, 1777

During the Philadelphia campaign of the American Revolutionary War, George Washington and the Continental Army were encamped here after their October 4, 1777, defeat at the Battle of Germantown, and immediately prior to their march to Valley Forge. From December 5–8, 1777, the Battle of White Marsh was fought here between British and American forces. Throughout the encampment, Washington was headquartered at the Emlen House, built by Quaker George Emlen in 1745. British General William Howe observed the American lines from the belltower of St. Thomas' Episcopal Church (at Bethlehem Pike and Camp Hill Road), site of the British encampment on December 5. Fort Washington State Park, in neighboring Whitemarsh Township, contains the area in which the primary American defenses were situated.

=== 2021 tornado ===
On September 1, 2021, an EF2 tornado spawned by the remnants of Hurricane Ida hit Upper Dublin Township, specifically the towns of Fort Washington and Maple Glen.

== Geography ==
According to the U.S. Census Bureau, the Township has a total area of 13.3 square miles (34.4 km^{2}), of which 13.2 square miles (34.3 km^{2}) is land and 0.03 square mile (0.08 km^{2}) (0.23%) is water. The township is situated in the Delaware watershed and almost all of it is drained by the Wissahickon Creek into the Schuylkill River, except for very small areas near the northeastern boundary drained by the Neshaminy Creek and the Pennypack Creek.

== Demographics ==
Historical population
Census	Pop.	Note	%±
1800	744		—
1850	1,330		—
1860	1,437		8.0%
1870	1,588		10.5%
1880	1,856		16.9%
1890	2,008		8.2%
1900	1,933		−3.7%
1910	2,936		51.9%
1920	3,045		3.7%
1930	4,379		43.8%
1940	4,620		5.5%
1950	6,637		43.7%
1960	10,184		53.4%
1970	19,562		92.1%
1980	22,348		14.2%
1990	24,028		7.5%
2000	25,878		7.7%
2010	25,569		−1.2%
2020	26,665		4.3%
(1930-2000); (1850-1930)

As of the 2010 census, there were 25,569 people, 9,397 households, and 7,214 families residing in the township. The population density was 1,966 inhabitants per square mile (759/km^{2}). The racial makeup of the township 83.0% White, 6.6% African American, 0.1% Native American, 8.5% Asian, 0.5% from other races, and 1.3% were two or more races. Hispanic or Latino of any race were 1.8% of the population.

There were 9,397 households, out of which 35.2% had children under the age of 18 living with them, 66.1% were married couples living together, 7.9% had a female householder with no husband present, and 23.2% were non-families. The average household size was 2.69 and the average family size was 3.13.

In the Township the population was spread out, with 27.3% under the age of 19, 3.9% from 20 to 24, 20.5% from 25 to 44, 33.2% from 45 to 64, and 15.1% who were 65 years of age or older. The median age was 43.9 years. For every 100 females, there were 94.6 males.

As of the 2000 census, the median income for a household in the township was $80,093, and the median income for a family was $91,418 (these figures had risen to $106,337 and $123,030 respectively as of a 2007 estimate). Males had a median income of $68,353 versus $39,152 for females. The per capita income for the Township was $37,994. About 2.7% of families and 3.0% of the population were below the poverty line, including 3.3% of those under age 18 and 3.6% of those age 65 or over.

The ten most common ancestries of residents are Irish (21.3%), German (19.0%), Italian (14.2%), English (10.2%), Russian (8.7%), Asian (6.2%), Polish (6.0%), African American (1.4%) United States or American (8.0%), and French (2.0%).

The most common languages spoken at home after English (88.6%) are Korean (3.1%), Italian (1.7%), Chinese (1.5%), Spanish or Spanish Creole (1.0%), German (0.7%), and French (0.6%).

== Notable people ==
- Bill Apter – professional wrestling journalist
- Kim Gallagher – athlete, U.S. Olympic track team
- Geologist (musician) - pseudonym of Brian Weitz, member of indie band Animal Collective
- Suzy Kolber – anchor and reporter for ESPN
- Zach Pfeffer – former midfielder for the Philadelphia Union soccer team
- Josh Singer – Emmy-nominated writer and script supervisor for The West Wing, Lie to Me, and Fringe; winner of Academy Award for Best Original Screenplay for Spotlight (2016).
- John Tartaglia – Tony Award nominee for Avenue Q and star of Disney Channel's Johnny and the Sprites
- Tom Warburton – animator, creator of the Cartoon Network series Codename: Kids Next Door
- Marc Zumoff – Philadelphia 76ers' television play-by-play commentator
- Josh Shapiro - The 48th governor of Pennsylvania.

== Government ==
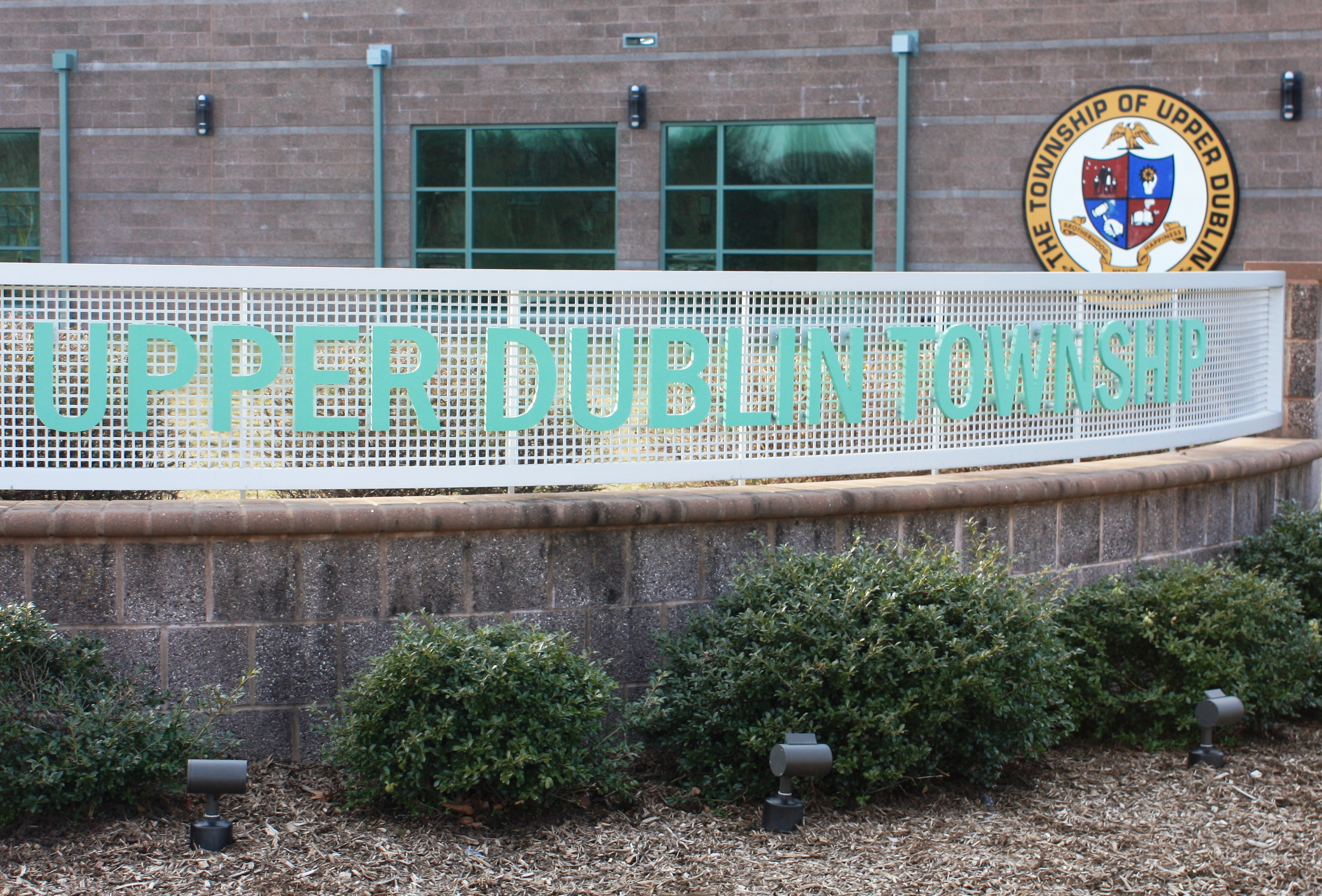
Upper Dublin Township Sign

Presidential elections results
Year	Republican	Democratic
2024	32.0% 6,175	67.2% 12,985
2020	29.3% 5,451	69.1% 12,862
2016	30.9% 5,045	65.2% 10,653
2012	40.6% 6,345	58.4% 9,131
2008	38.1% 6,106	61.3% 9,836
2004	43.0% 6,589	56.8% 8,704
2000	41.8% 5,827	56.0% 7,810
1996	41.6% 5,179	50.8% 6,329
1992	40.9% 5,423	43.0% 5,696

Upper Dublin became a Pennsylvania First Class Township in 1946. Elected representatives (Commissioners) serve four-year terms of office. The government is a council/manager type. There are seven commissioners, one for each ward. The Commissioners from odd numbered wards stand for election in 2023, 2027, 2031 etc. and the even numbered wards in 2021, 2025, 2029 etc. A manager runs the day-to-day operations with his staff. There are eight departments: Administration, Finance, Library, Public Works, Police, Parks and Recreation, Code Enforcement, and Fleet & Facilities. Fire protection is provided primarily by the Fort Washington Fire Company No. 1, a volunteer fire department.

== Business and industry ==
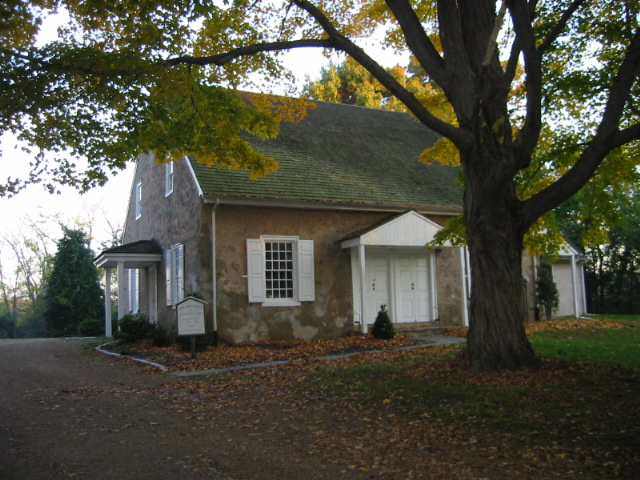
The Upper Dublin Friends Meeting House, built in 1814.

The Fort Washington Office Park is a center of commerce in Upper Dublin Township. When it opened in 1955, this was the first modern suburban business park on the East Coast. Strategically located at a Pennsylvania Turnpike interchange, this 566-acre suburban office park contains more than 80 commercial buildings totaling over six million square feet, and is home to 230 businesses, employing more than 12,000 workers across a variety of industries. The mix of uses has shifted from light industrial to office-based businesses over its 60+ year lifespan.

To remain competitive, Upper Dublin Township partnered with state and county government agencies to develop a multifaceted modernization plan including major infrastructure improvements, transportation planning and a proposed mixed-use zoning ordinance. With the proposed mixed-use zoning, the addition of new multifamily housing, retail and dining are anticipated. In September 2016, the Township formed a new Municipal Authority, to oversee the planning, design and financing of the Office Park's public improvement projects going forward.

The business community's response to this modernization program has been positive, with numerous new business openings including corporate headquarters, research labs and call centers. Among the companies that recently moved in to Fort Washington Office Park are Aon Affinity Insurance, Kellogg Company, Citizens Bank, Life Time Athletics, Ashfield Healthcare, Impax Laboratories, Lincoln Investment Planning, TruMark Financial Federal Credit Union, TransWorld Systems, Toll Brothers Inc, Bruce E. Toll (BET) investments, Connexin Software and Acclara Solutions. They join long-term businesses in Fort Washington including Honeywell, Johnson & Johnson and NutriSystem's headquarters offices. Toll Brothers moved its corporate headquarters to the office park in 2020.

In 2017 Upper Dublin Township acquired a 56,000 s.f. office building in the Fort Washington Office Park, to house several municipal functions and supplement its community services. Later, it was announced that the Upper Dublin Public Library would be moving to this facility. The Upper Dublin Public Library opened in 2020.

== Transportation ==
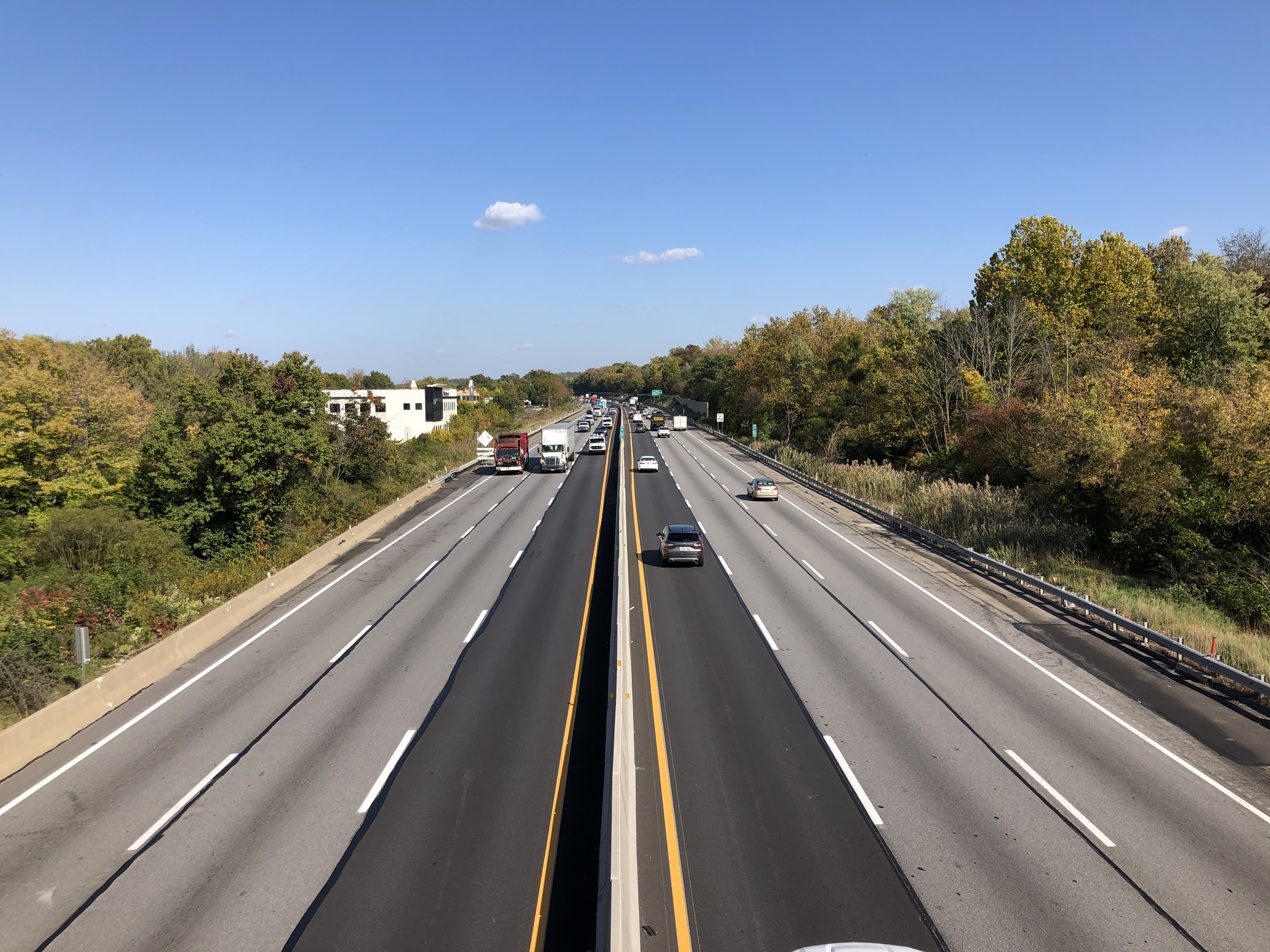
I-276/Pennsylvania Turnpike eastbound in Upper Dublin Township

As of 2018 there were 131.11 miles (211.00 km) of public roads in Upper Dublin Township, of which 3.70 miles (5.95 km) were maintained by the Pennsylvania Turnpike Commission (PTC), 23.79 miles (38.29 km) were maintained by the Pennsylvania Department of Transportation (PennDOT) and 103.62 miles (166.76 km) were maintained by the township.

Numbered routes serving Upper Dublin Township include PA 63 (Welsh Road, which forms the northeast border), PA 152 (Limekiln Pike), I-276 (Pennsylvania Turnpike), and PA 309 (Fort Washington Expressway). I-276 and PA 309 meet at the Fort Washington Interchange. I-276 also has a westbound cashless tolling slip ramp in Upper Dublin Township connecting with Virginia Drive east of PA 309. Other important roads include Bethlehem Pike, Butler Pike, Morris Road, Norristown Road, and Susquehanna Road.

The Lansdale/Doylestown Line of SEPTA Regional Rail passes through Upper Dublin Township, but has no stops within the township. The nearest stops are the Fort Washington station in Whitemarsh Township, Oreland station in Springfield, and the Ambler station in Borough of Ambler. SEPTA provides bus service to Upper Dublin Township along Route 94, which passes through the western part of the township near Fort Washington on its route between Chestnut Hill and the Montgomery Mall; Route 95, which passes through the western part of the township near Fort Washington on its route between Gulph Mills and Willow Grove; Route 201, which provides weekday service between the Fort Washington business parks and the Fort Washington station; and Route 310, which serves the eastern portion of the township along its route between the Willow Grove Park Mall and the Horsham business parks.

Norfolk Southern Railway's Morrisville Line freight railroad line passes through Upper Dublin Township, running parallel to the south of the Pennsylvania Turnpike.

== Education ==
There are four elementary schools (K-5), one middle school (6-8) and one high school (9-12) which are fully accredited by the Middle States Association of Colleges and Schools. The professional staff has an average of 16 years teaching experience and approximately 85 percent hold advanced degrees.

The four elementary schools are Fort Washington Elementary School, Maple Glen Elementary School, Jarrettown Elementary School, and Thomas Fitzwater Elementary School; the middle school is Sandy Run Middle School, and the high school is Upper Dublin High School. Upper Dublin High School is considered to be one of the best-performing public schools in Pennsylvania, with the fifth highest combined score average on the Scholastic Assessment Test (SAT) in the state. The high school has been recognized three times by the United States Department of Education as a Blue Ribbon School of Excellence.

The Township is also home to a number of private schools. There is an area Catholic grade school, Our Lady of Mercy Regional Catholic School, in Maple Glen. Our Lady of Mercy was formed in 2012 by the merger of St. Alphonsus in Maple Glen, St. Anthony-St. Joseph in Ambler, and St. Catherine of Siena in Horsham.

The township has the following universities: Temple University Ambler and Fort Washington campuses, DeVry University Fort Washington campus and Gwynedd Mercy College Fort Washington campus.

== Parks and recreation ==
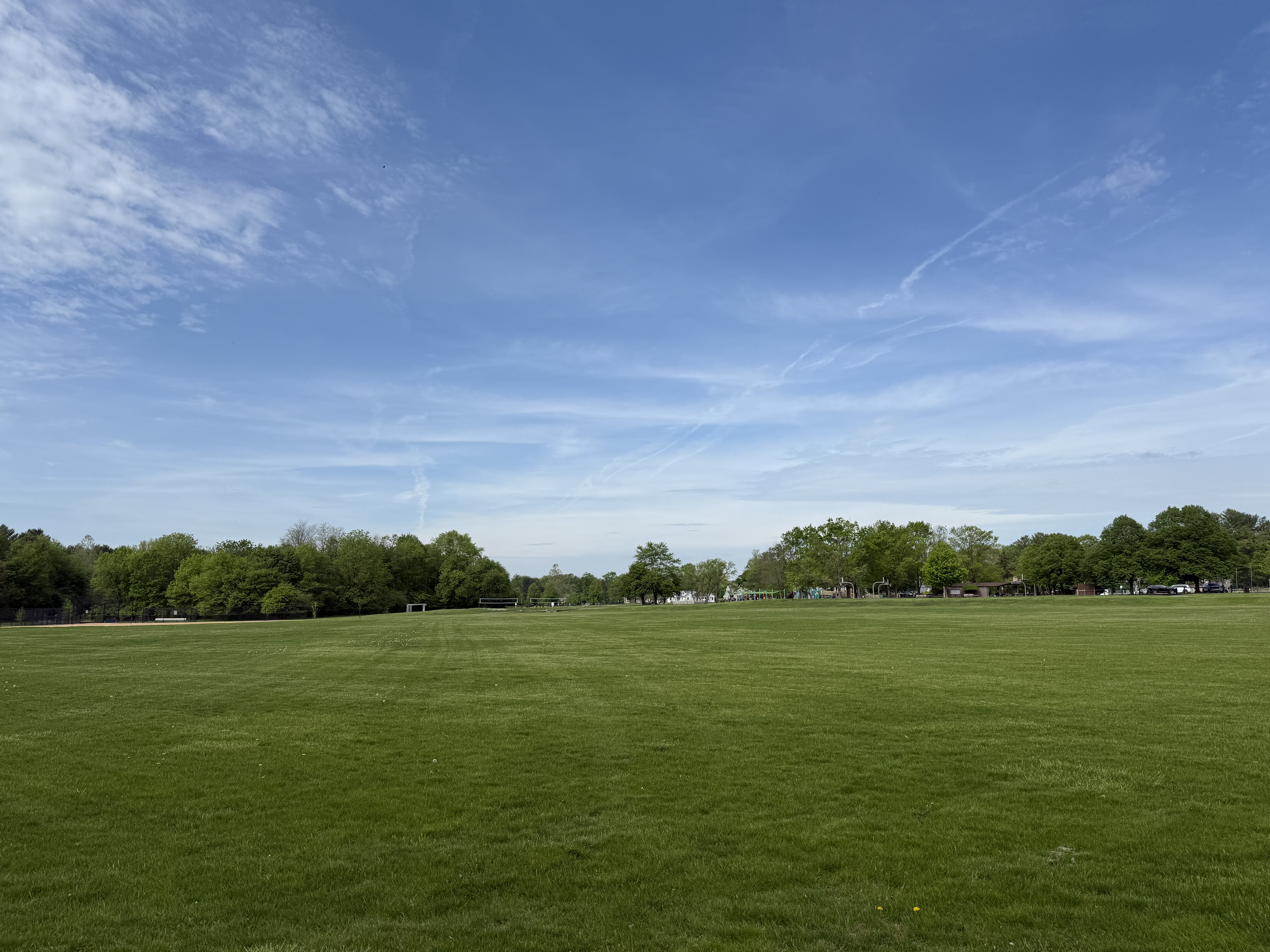
Mondauk Common park

Upper Dublin has more than 40 sites and 600 acres (2.4 km^{2}) of parkland and open space ranging in size from neighborhood squares to sprawling meadow-like areas. There are natural resource areas as well as active recreation sites with varying amenities including tennis courts, play lots, jogging/exercise trails, picnic pavilions, playing fields, basketball courts and sand volleyball courts. In 2005, the Township opened MonDaug Bark Park, with wooded trails as well as a 1-acre (0.40 ha) fenced, off-leash dog park.

In 2006, the Board of Commissioners adopted an extensive Open Space & Environmental Resources Protection Plan that guides local acquisition, development and protection efforts to the year 2020.

Upper Dublin is also home to two golf courses. Manufacturers Golf & Country Club is nestled on historic Camp Hill and is nationally known. Lu Lu Country Club is located in the southeastern section of the township bordering Abington.
