= Upper Dublin High School =

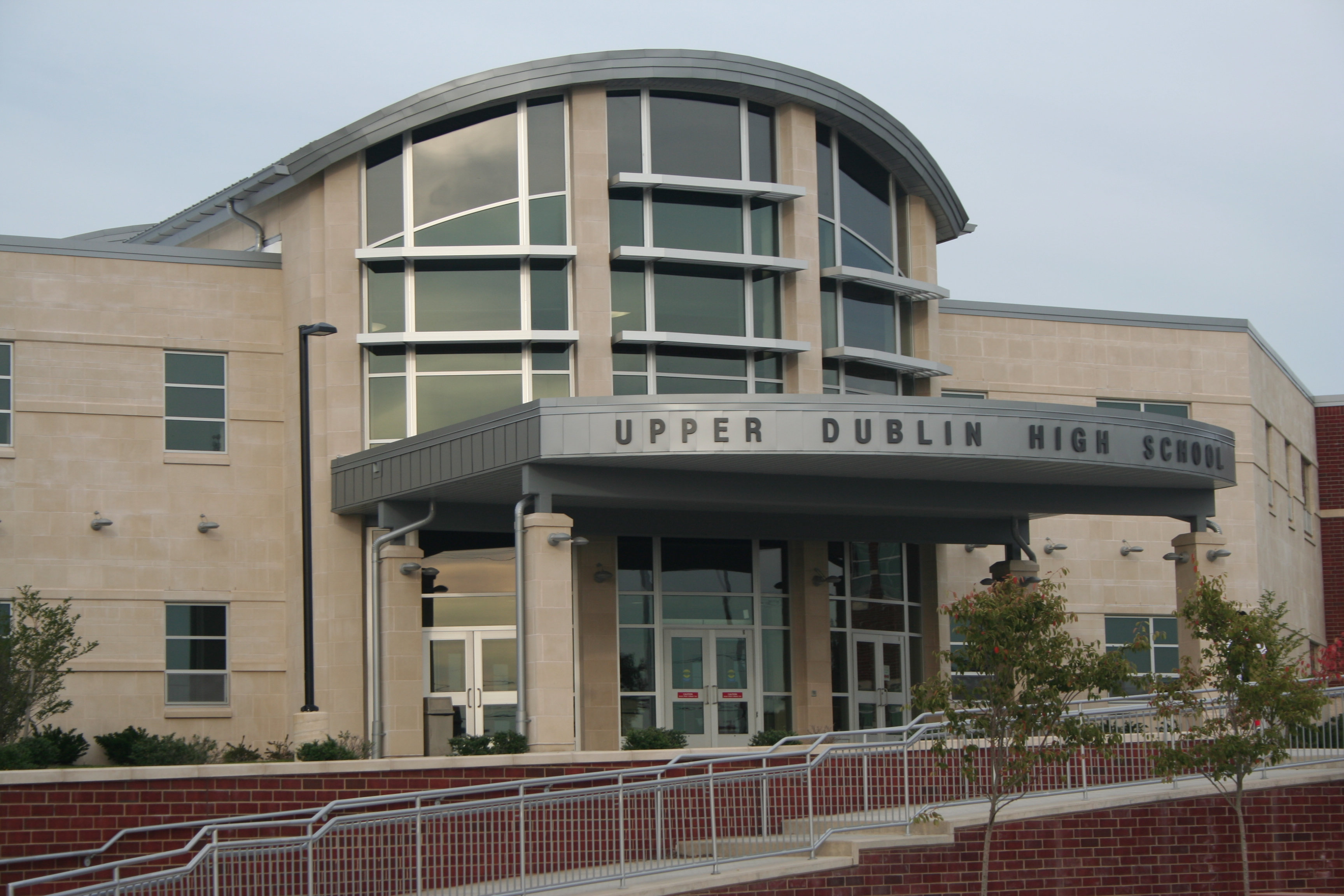
- Upper Dublin High School, 2013

Location
- 800 Loch Alsh Avenue; Fort Washington, Pennsylvania 19034; United States; 40.1528°N 75.1990°W

Information
- Type: Public high school
- Opened: 1955
- School district: Upper Dublin School District
- Superintendent: Laurie Smith
- CEEB code: 391415
- Principal: Daniel Ortiz
- Faculty: 128
- Teaching staff: 92.20 (FTE)
- Grades: 9–12
- Enrollment: 1,280 (2023–2024)
- Student to teacher ratio: 13.88
- Colors: Cardinal; Gray
- Athletics: 14 Boys, 14 Girls
- Athletics conference: PIAA District 1
- Mascot: Clyde the Cardinal
- Team name: Cardinals
- Rival: Wissahickon High School
- Yearbook: Mundockian
- Communities served: Upper Dublin Township
- Feeder schools: Sandy Run Middle School
- Website: Upper Dublin High School

Upper Dublin High School (UDHS) is a four-year public high school located in Fort Washington, Pennsylvania. It is the sole high school in the Upper Dublin School District.

UDHS is recognized as a National Blue Ribbon School of Excellence by the United States Department of Education. It is accredited by the Middle States Association of Colleges and Schools and certified by the Pennsylvania Department of Education. The school has a 99%+ graduation rate, and more than 95% of graduates continue on to a two- or four-year college.

== Campus ==
After months of deliberations, the school board decided to move forward and proposed to rebuild the high school. On March 20, 2007, the voters in Upper Dublin were presented with a referendum. They approved, despite the risk of a significant tax increase. Initial estimates of the new construction is $119 million. The construction was to occur in stages on the site of the current building and demolition of the oldest wing began in summer 2008. It was completed in the Summer of 2012, on time and within budget, and was formally opened with a ceremony in Fall 2012.

== Educational Support Team ==
The Educational Support Team (EST) is a team of faculty members offering assistance to students who are having problems in school because of drug and alcohol use or because of depression or thoughts of suicide. The Team identifies, intervenes, and refers those students for help.

== Community Study ==
Students in the senior class are provided with the opportunity to investigate career opportunities in the final three weeks of the year. Students are required to have a community sponsor, a faculty sponsor, at least a "C" average in each course, meet attendance requirements, and have committee approval in order to participate in the Community Study Program.

== Eastern Center for Arts and Technology ==
Students at Upper Dublin High School have the option to attend the Eastern Center for Arts and Technology, in Willow Grove. Programs taken at the Eastern Center are considered part of the high school program and count as elective credit toward graduation. They give students the opportunity to reinforce their career path after high school, get ready for employment, and get a head start in collegiate studies in that field.

== Athletics ==
Upper Dublin High School is a AAAA and AAA member of the Suburban One American Conference of District 1 of the Pennsylvania Interscholastic Athletic Association (PIAA), the state high school athletic governing body. The school has 14 male varsity sports and 13 female varsity sports recognized by PIAA. The school also has a cheerleading squad.

- Baseball – AAAA
- Basketball – AAAA
- Bowling – AAAA
- Cross country – AAA
- Field Hockey – AAA
- Football – AAAAA
- Golf – AAAA
- Indoor Track & Field – AAAA
- Lacrosse – AAAA
- Soccer – AAA
- Softball – AAAA
- Swimming and Diving – AAA Girls are the 2025 state champions
- Tennis – AAA
- Track & Field – AAA
- Volleyball – AAA
- Wrestling – AAA

== Removal of Huckleberry Finn from curriculum ==
Upper Dublin High School was the subject of controversy when in July 1996, then superintendent Dr. Clair Brown Jr. announced that Mark Twain's book, Adventures of Huckleberry Finn, would be removed from the school's required reading list. Brown removed the book as an administrative action, claiming that parents and students had protested the inclusion of the book in the curriculum because its frequent use of the word "nigger" made "black children uncomfortable".

== September 2021 Tornado ==
On September 1, 2021, the remnants of Hurricane Ida made a direct hit onto Fort Washington, Pennsylvania, where Upper Dublin High School is located. The resulting EF2 tornado caused moderate damage throughout the suburb, including damage to the school. The football stadium, accessory athletic fields, natatorium, and air filtration systems all suffered damage, leaving students under virtual instruction until September 27, 2021.

== Notable alumni ==
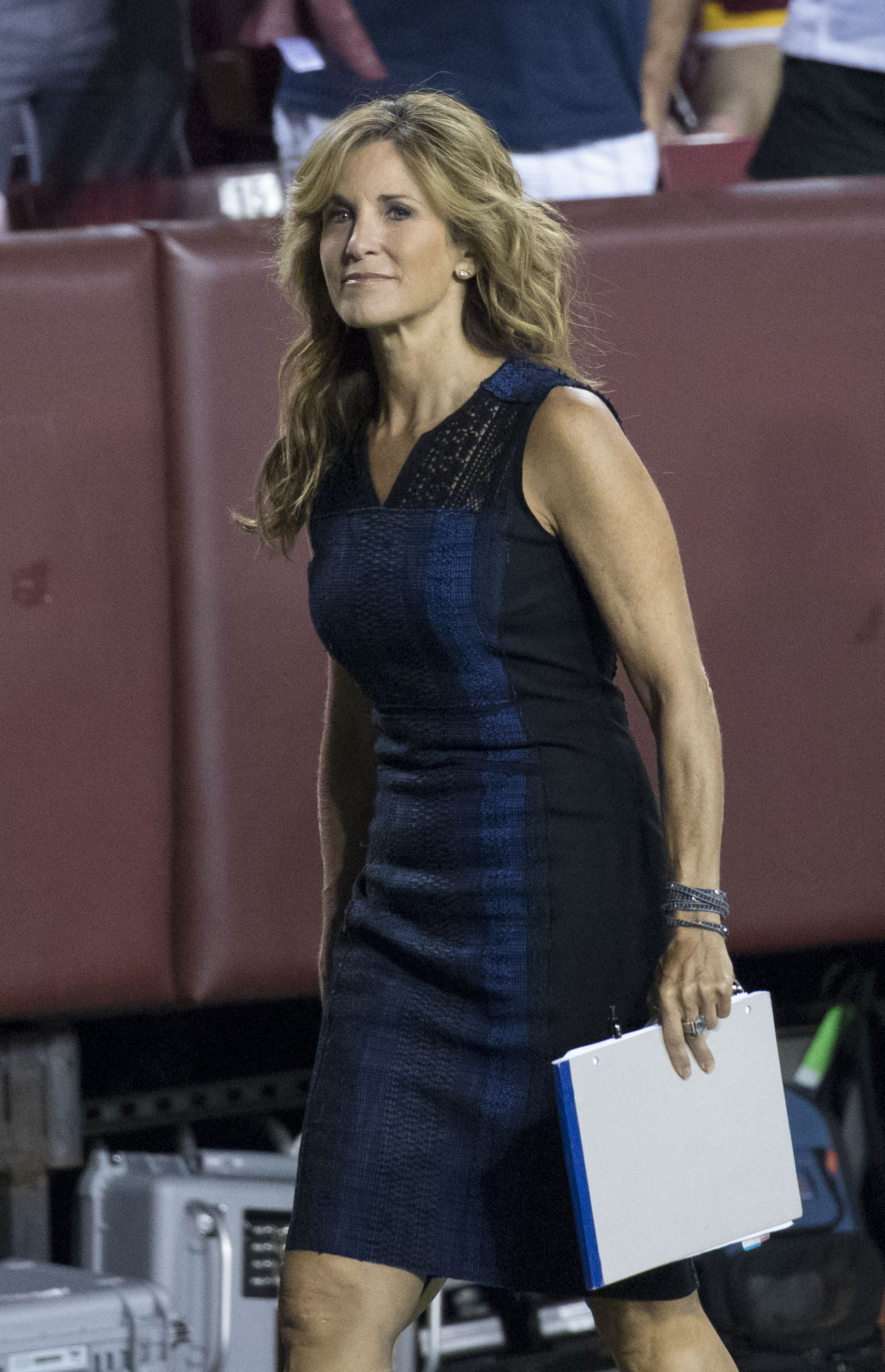
Suzy Kolber

- Kim Gallagher (Class of 1982) – middle-distance runner who won a silver and a bronze medal at the 1984 and 1988 Olympics
- Suzy Kolber (Class of 1982) – American football sideline reporter, co-producer, and sportscaster for ESPN
- Zach Pfeffer (Class of 2013) – soccer player for the Philadelphia Union and Colorado Rapids
- John Tartaglia (Class of 1996) – American actor, singer, and puppeteer
- Dorn Taylor (Class of 1975) – Major League Baseball player for the Pittsburgh Pirates and Baltimore Orioles
- Josh Singer (Class of 1990) – producer, screenwriter

== Honors ==
In 2007, the school was named the No. 1 high school in Montgomery County by The Philadelphia Inquirer. The school was also ranked No. 8 in Philadelphia Magazine's "100 Best Public and Private Schools".
