= UDSD =

UDSD may refer to:

- Upper Darby School District, Upper Darby Township, Delaware County, Pennsylvania
- Upper Dublin School District, Upper Dublin Township, Montgomery County, Pennsylvania
