= Fort Washington, Pennsylvania =

Unincorporated community in Pennsylvania, US

Fort Washington
- Census-designated place
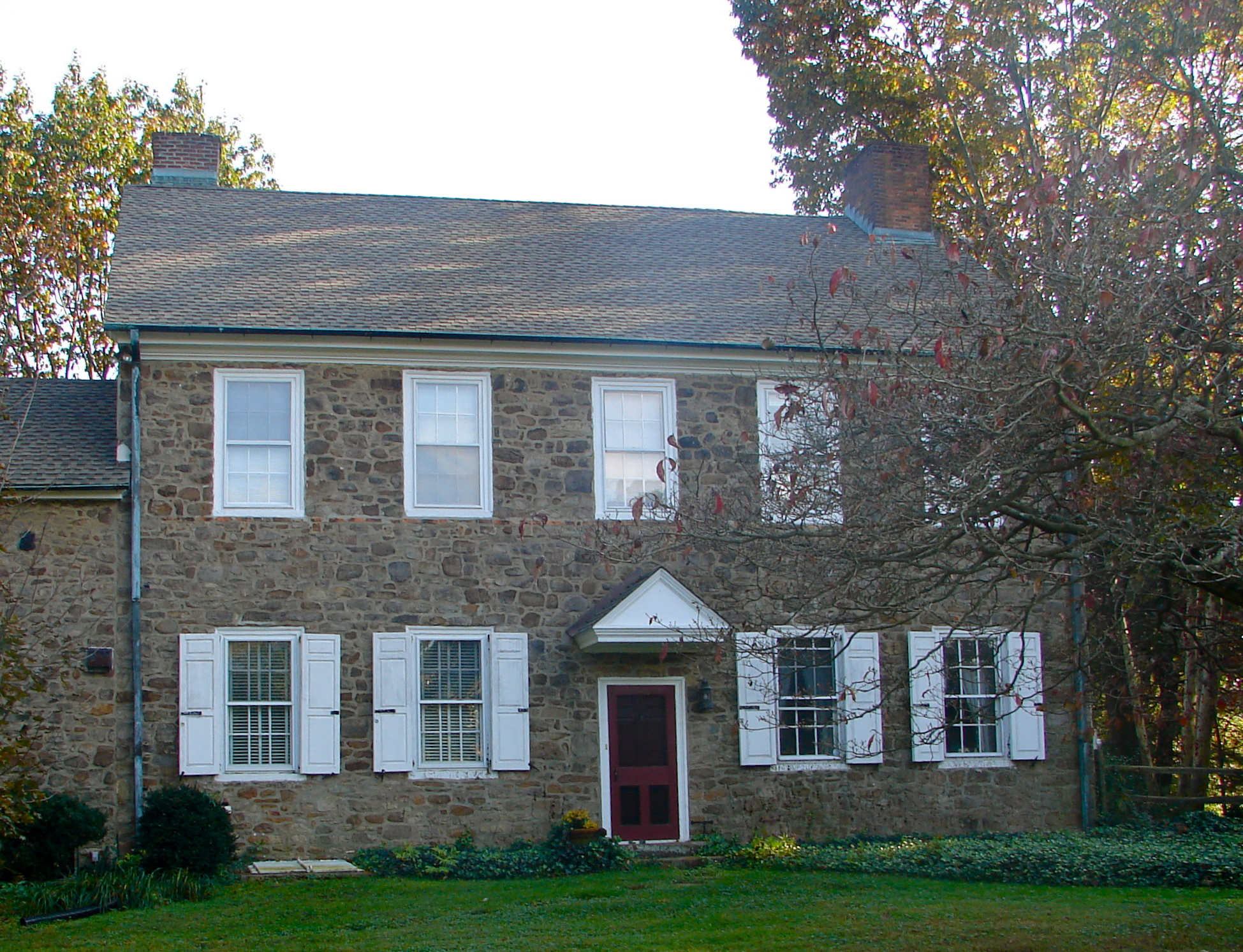
- Quaker Manor House

- Location of Fort Washington in Pennsylvania Fort Washington (the United States)
- Coordinates: 40°08′19″N 75°11′29″W
- Country: United States
- State: Pennsylvania
- County: Montgomery
- Township: Upper Dublin (CDP); Whitemarsh

Area
  - Total: 3.25 sq mi (8.43 km^{2})
  - Land: 3.25 sq mi (8.43 km^{2})
  - Water: 0 sq mi (0.00 km^{2})
- Elevation: 233 ft (71 m)

Population (2020)
  - Total: 5,910
  - Density: 1,816.3/sq mi (701.26/km^{2})
- Time zone: UTC-5 (EST)
  - Summer (DST): UTC-4 (EDT)
- ZIP codes: 19034
- Area codes: 215, 267, and 445
- FIPS code: 42-26872

Fort Washington is a census-designated place and suburb of Philadelphia in Montgomery County, Pennsylvania, United States. The CDP, as of 2020, is entirely in Upper Dublin Township. The population was 5,446 at the 2010 census.

== History ==
Prior to the American Revolutionary War, present-day Fort Washington was settled by German immigrants, including Philip Engard who immigrated in 1728. Engard purchased a 100 acres (40 ha) lot of land on what was to be named Susquehanna Road and Fort Washington Avenue. By the mid-18th century, the area came to be known as Engardtown, and Fort Washington Avenue was originally called Engardtown Road. The house built by Philip Engard is listed as the "Engard Family Home - 1765" in the Upper Dublin Township Open Space & Environmental Resource Protection Plan - 2005, as part of the Upper Dublin Historical Properties #25.

=== American Revolutionary War ===
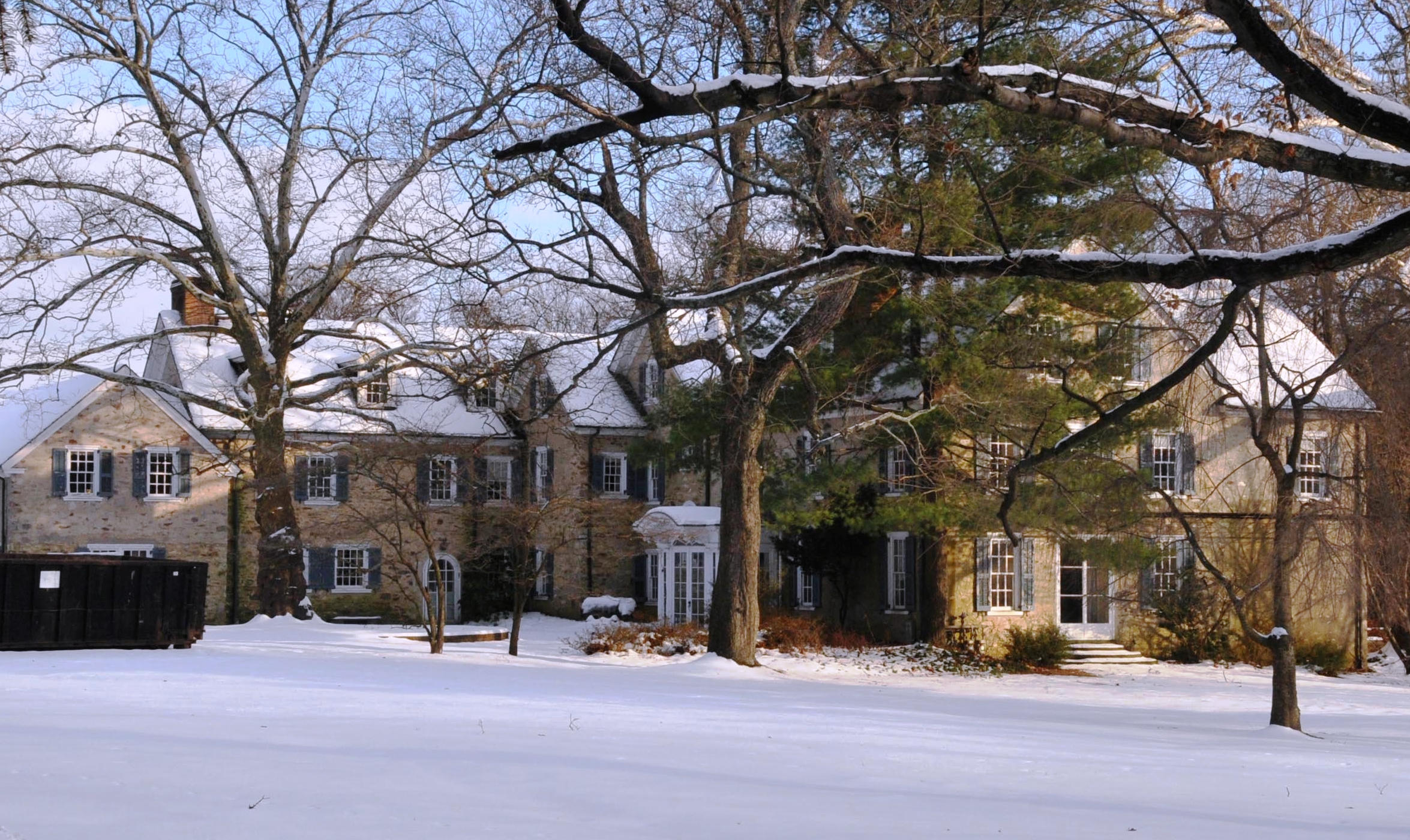
Emlen House in Fort Washington

During the Philadelphia campaign of the American Revolutionary War, George Washington and the Continental Army encamped in present-day Fort Washington following their October 4, 1777, defeat at the Battle of Germantown, and immediately prior to their march to Valley Forge. During the encampment, Washington was headquartered at the Emlen House, built by George Emlen, a Quaker, in 1745.

Later that year, between December 5 and December 8, 1777, the Battle of White Marsh was fought in present-day Fort Washington between the British and Continental Army. British commander General William Howe observed the American lines from the bell tower of St. Thomas' Episcopal Church at Bethlehem Pike and Camp Hill Road, where the British Army was encamped on December 5.

A current Pennsylvania park, Fort Washington State Park in Fort Washington, includes the area where Washington and the Continental Army were located during the Battle of White Marsh.

=== Great Train Wreck of 1856 ===
On July 17, 1856, Fort Washington was the site of one of the worst train accidents in the United States when two North Pennsylvania Railroad trains collided with one another near the Sandy Run station, later renamed Camp Hill, now the defunct Fellwick Station). The exact number of deaths is uncertain, but 59 were killed instantly and dozens more perished from their injuries. Many of the dead were children from St. Michael's Roman Catholic Church from the Kensington section of Philadelphia, who were traveling to Sheaff's Woods, a park in the Fort Washington area for a Sunday school picnic.

=== Incorporation into Upper Dublin Township ===
On January 1, 1946, the Township of Upper Dublin was created, and in doing so, encompassed Fort Washington along with nine other communities. Parts of Fort Washington were also incorporated into Whitemarsh Township.

== Business and industry ==
=== Fort Washington Office Park ===
The primary center of business and industry in Upper Dublin Township is the Fort Washington Office Park, which occupies 536 acres (217 ha) and contains 6,000,000 square feet (560,000 m^{2}) of building space. There are more than 65 buildings of various sizes up to 658,535 square feet (61,179.9 m^{2}). The park contains the offices of over 100 different companies, including Honeywell, Aetna, AccuWeather, Eastern National, Genworth Financial, and a suburban campus of Temple University. The office park was also home to the corporate headquarters of CDNow, the pioneering online music retailer. It is also home to one of the earliest branches of School of Rock. In recent years, the Fort Washington Office Park has experienced a vacancy rate higher than that of other commercial/industrial parks in the region, due in some part to problems with flooding.

==== Former Fort Washington Expo Center ====
The Fort Washington Office Park was also home to the Fort Washington Expo Center. Opened in 1993 in the former Honeywell factory, the Expo Center hosted some of the region's biggest consumer and trade shows, and at 290,000 square feet (27,000 m^{2}), was the largest such suburban venue in the northeastern United States. The Expo Center closed in 2006 after the building was sold to Liberty Property Trust who renovated the center into Class A office space. The center, which can accommodate 2,800 employees, was leased to GMAC Mortgage who took over the space in 2007. GMAC Mortgage went out of business in 2013.

=== Johnson & Johnson facility ===
On Camp Hill Road in Whitemarsh is the corporate headquarters of Johnson & Johnson division McNeil Consumer & Specialty Pharmaceuticals, marketers of over-the-counter and prescription pharmaceuticals including Tylenol (acetaminophen) and Motrin IB (ibuprofen) products. Their building is based on a 110-acre (45 ha) site and has a workforce of 2,600 employees. Johnson and Johnson closed this plant in April 2010 after a series of manufacturing problems led to embarrassing product recalls for faulty manufacturing practices.

== Transportation ==
Fort Washington is the location of an interchange between the east-west Pennsylvania Turnpike (Interstate 276) and north-south Pennsylvania Route 309 (Fort Washington Expressway). This interchange provides access from both roads to Fort Washington via Pennsylvania Avenue. Bethlehem Pike runs north-south through Fort Washington to the west of PA 309. SEPTA Regional Rail's Lansdale/Doylestown Line stops at the nearby Fort Washington station. SEPTA provides bus serve to Fort Washington along routes 94, 95, and 201. OurBus provides intercity bus service from Fort Washington to Park Avenue in the Manhattan section in New York City as part of a route running from West Chester to New York City. The bus stop in Fort Washington is located adjacent to the Fort Washington station. The route started on December 21, 2017.

== Education ==
Residents living in the Fort Washington census-designated place, in Upper Dublin Township, are served by the Upper Dublin School District.

Those living with Fort Washington addresses in Whitemarsh Township are served by Colonial School District.

=== Public ===
- Fort Washington Elementary School (K-5)
- Upper Dublin High School (9-12) (once ranked as the eighth best high school in the state)

=== Private ===
- Germantown Academy (PK-12) (oldest nonsectarian day school in the country)
- Open Door Christian Academy (PK-8) (closed down in 2020)
- The Paul Green School of Rock Music
- Our Lady of Mercy Regional Catholic school (PK-8) 2018 Blue Ribbon Award

== Demographics ==
Historical population
Census	Pop.	Note	%±
1990	3,699		—
2000	3,680		−0.5%
2010	5,446		48.0%
2020	5,910		8.5%

As of the 2010 census, the CDP was 86.2% White, 4.5% Black or African American, 0.1% Native American, 6.2% Asian, 0.5% were Some Other Race, and 1.3% were two or more races. 1.8% of the population were of Hispanic or Latino ancestry.

As of the census of 2000, there were 3,680 people, 1,161 households, and 1,013 families residing in the community. The population density was 1,349.9 inhabitants per square mile (521.2/km^{2}). There were 1,173 housing units at an average density of 430.3/sq mi (166.1/km^{2}). The racial makeup of the community was 91.30% White, 3.04% African American, 0.08% Native American, 5.03% Asian (0.46% Asian Indian, 2.20% Chinese, 1.93% Korean, 0.16% Vietnamese, 0.27% Other Asian), 0.11% from other races, and 0.43% from two or more races. Hispanic or Latino of any race were 0.71% of the population.(0.08% Mexican, 0.19% Puerto Rican, 0.11% Cuban, 0.33% Other Hispanic). 90.65% of the population was White, non-Hispanic.

There were 1,161 households, out of which 45.4% had children under the age of 18 living with them, 81.7% were married couples living together, 4.2% had a female householder with no husband present, and 12.7% were non-families. 10.9% of all households were made up of individuals, and 4.0% had someone living alone who was 65 years of age or older. The average household size was 3.06 and the average family size was 3.32.

The population was spread out, with 28.5% under the age of 18, 5.2% from 18 to 24, 22.1% from 25 to 44, 32.4% from 45 to 64, and 11.8% who were 65 years of age or older. The median age was 42 years. For every 100 females, there were 100.0 males. For every 100 females age 18 and over, there were 91.6 males.

The median income for a household in the community was $103,469, and the median income for a family was $112,863. Males had a median income of $76,205 versus $37,321 for females. The per capita income for the community was $43,090. About 1.5% of families and 3.4% of the population were below the poverty line, including 3.7% of those under age 18 and none of those age 65 or over.

== Climate ==
Fort Washington has a hot-summer humid continental climate (Dfa) closely bordering upon a humid subtropical climate (Cfa.) Average monthly temperatures range from 31.7 °F (−0.2 °C) in January to 76.1 °F (24.5 °C) in July. The local hardiness zone is 7a.

== Points of interest ==
- Clifton House
- Fort Washington State Park
- The Highlands Mansion & Garden
- Hope Lodge

== Notable people ==
- Norman Grubb, missionary.
- Suzy Kolber, ESPN personality
- Lexie Gerson, basketball player
