= Upper Dublin Friends Meeting House =

Quaker congregation in Montgomery County, Pennsylvania

Coordinates: 40.161286°N 75.187538°W

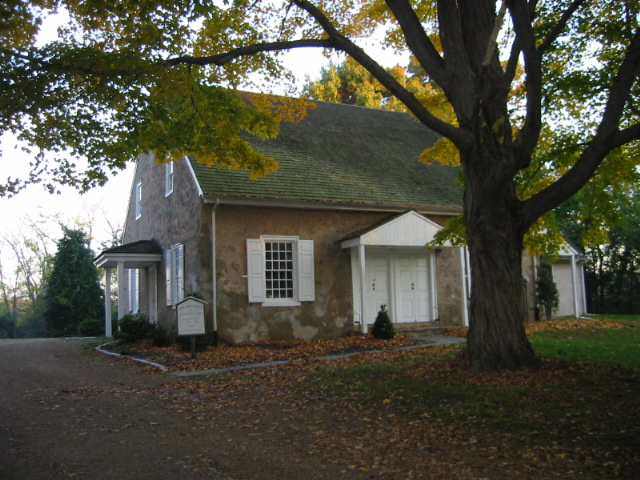
The Upper Dublin Friends Meeting House

The Upper Dublin Friends Meeting House is a Quaker meeting house located at the intersection of Fort Washington Avenue and Meetinghouse Roads in Upper Dublin Township, Pennsylvania in the United States.

The building was constructed in 1814 on land donated by local resident Phebe Shoemaker. The graveyard of nearly one acre contains the graves of many of the township's most notable early families.

Bean's 1884 History of Montgomery County, Pennsylvania makes mention of the horse-block (a step for mounting or dismounting from a horse) that can still be seen at the Meeting House:

"About twenty yards from the front-door is a horse-block, of stone, consisting of five steps to the top, four and a half feet from the ground and three and a half feet wide, now so rare as to become an object of interest to the antiquary."

The Upper Dublin Friends Meeting is a thriving congregation, with Meeting for Worship every Sunday at 10 a.m., and is part of the Abington Quarterly Meeting of the Philadelphia Yearly Meeting of the Religious Society of Friends.
