= Quaker Manor House =

Historic house in Pennsylvania, United States

- U.S. National Register of Historic Places
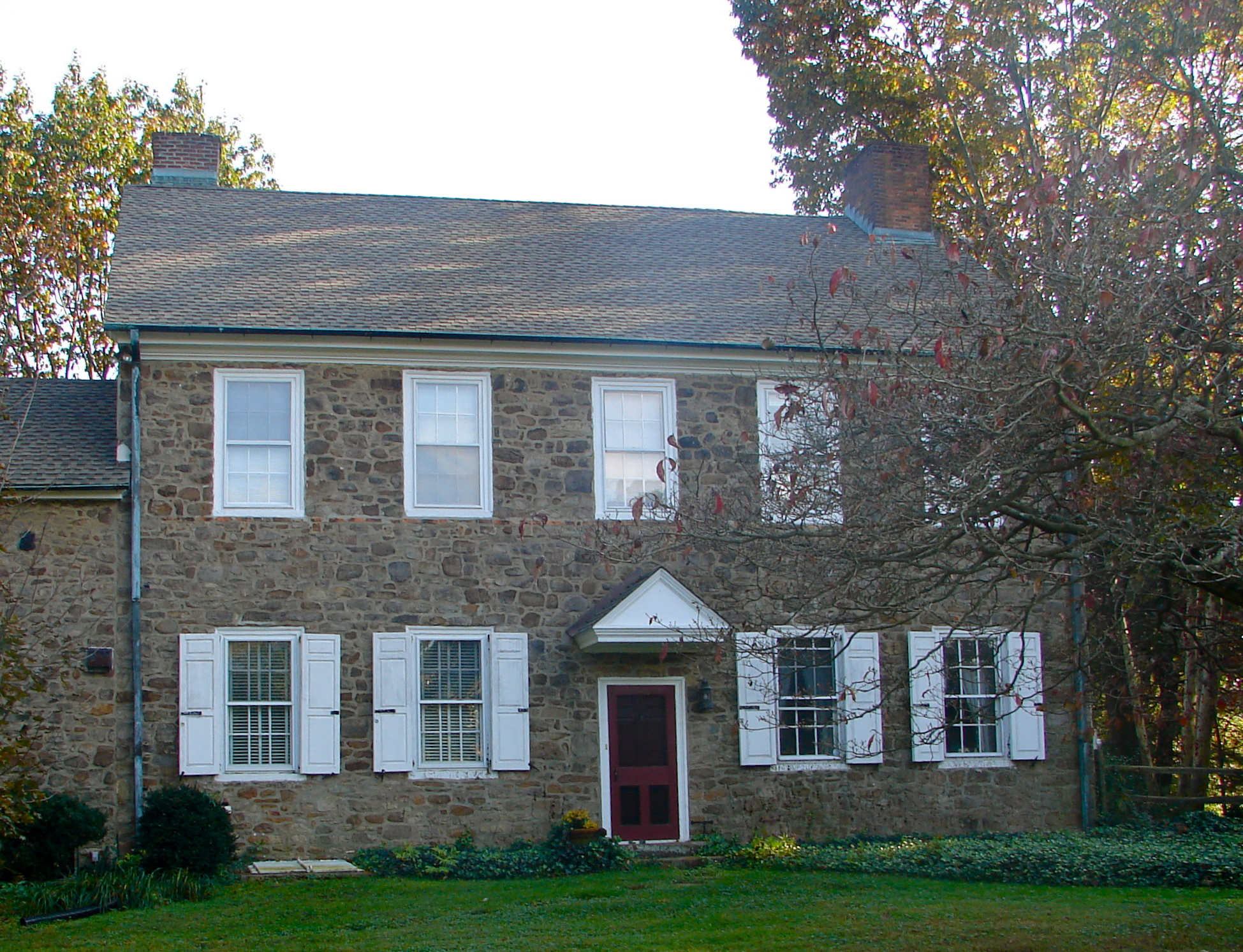

- Location within Pennsylvania Location within the United States
- Location: Fort Washington, Pennsylvania
- Coordinates: 40°8′43″N 75°11′20″W
- Built: 1730
- NRHP reference No.: 76001654
- Added to NRHP: November 21, 1976

The Quaker Manor House is an historic building at 1165 Pinetown Road in Fort Washington, Pennsylvania, United States.

== History and architectural features ==
This historic structure was built in 1730 as a residence and fur trading post by John Getty, who served as an Indian agent representing the Province of Pennsylvania and Governor Patrick Gordon, and a friend of James Logan. After Getty's death, the house was purchased by Quaker Jeremiah Warder, a Philadelphia merchant, who lived in the house until 1783. Warder, who was a friend of Benjamin Chew, was arrested during the American Revolution and imprisoned in Virginia. During this period, the Quaker Manor House was also known by the name "Warder's Conquest."

During the American Revolutionary War, George Washington and the Continental Army spent six weeks camped at nearby Whitemarsh in the autumn of 1777. During the encampment, the Quaker Manor House served as the headquarters for Washington's Surgeon General, John Cochran.

The Quaker Manor House is listed on the U.S. National Register of Historic Places, and is currently a privately owned residence.
