= Lydia Darragh =

American spy (1729–1789)

- Born: 1729; Dublin, Ireland
- Died: December 28, 1789 (aged 59–60); Philadelphia, Pennsylvania, United States
- Spouse: William Darragh
- Children: Charles Darragh, Ann Darragh, John Darragh, William Darragh, and Susannah Darragh

Lydia Darragh (1729 – December 28, 1789) was an Irishwoman said to have crossed the lines during the British occupation of Philadelphia, Pennsylvania during the American Revolutionary War, delivering information to George Washington and the Continental Army that warned them of a pending British attack. Modern analyses class Darragh's story, largely based on family lore, as historically unsubstantiated.

== Early life ==
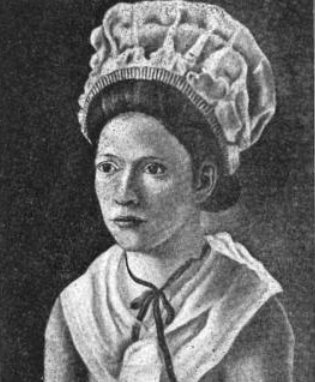
Ann Darragh, Lydia's daughter, born 1757

Lydia Barrington was born in 1729 in Dublin to John and Mary (Aldridge) Barrington, the youngest child of six. On November 2, 1753, she married the family's tutor, William Darragh, the son of a clergyman. A few years later, they emigrated to Philadelphia, where William worked as a tutor and Lydia as a midwife. She gave birth to nine children, four of whom died at birth. The surviving children were Charles (born 1755), Ann (born 1757), John (born 1763), William (born 1766), and Susannah (born 1768).

== American Revolutionary War ==
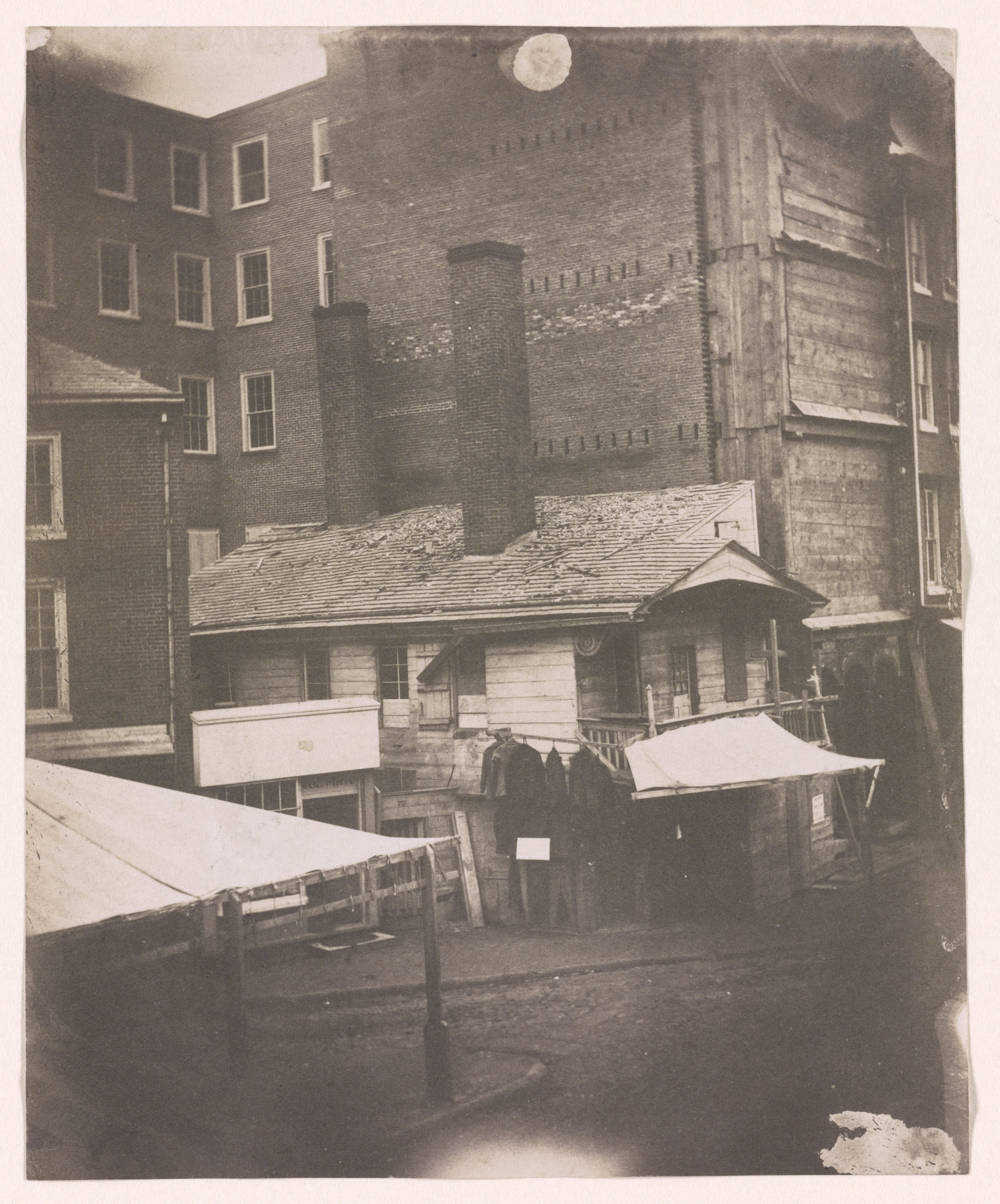
Darragh house circa 1850

As Quakers, the Darraghs were pacifists. However, their oldest son, Charles, served with the 2nd Pennsylvania Regiment of the Continental Army.

Lydia's "claim to fame" is saving Washington's army from an ambush at Whitemarsh in December 1777. The story was first published in 1827, and was later elaborated on. In 1777, the British were occupying Philadelphia. Lydia Darragh's house happened to be across the street from General William Howe's headquarters, and the night of December 2, 1777, British officers commandeered one of her rooms for a secret conference. Lydia eavesdropped on their meeting, learning of their plan to go after Washington's army at Whitemarsh. On December 4, she requested and received a pass to leave the city to go Frankford Mill to buy flour. Once outside the city, she made her way toward the Continental Army at Whitemarsh. On the road, she met a friend who happened to be Colonel Thomas Craig from Washington's army. Lydia passed the information of the impending British attack through him, got her flour, and headed back to Philadelphia. That night the British marched on Whitemarsh; instead of the ambush they had planned, the Continental army was at arms and ready. General Howe was forced to return to Philadelphia.

On September 26, 1777, British troops occupied Philadelphia. After the Battle of Germantown, General William Howe moved across the street from the Darraghs, in a house formerly belonging to John Cadwalader. Darragh began regularly providing her son Charles with information regarding the enemy's plans, gathered by eavesdropping in her home and around town. She would often write this information in simple code on pieces of scrap paper, which she hid in large buttons that she and the messengers wore. On September 27, 1777, Captain John Andre, aide to General Charles Gray requested use of the Darraghs home for Howe's staff. Lydia told them that they had already sent away their two youngest children to live with relatives in another city, but that they had nowhere else to go and would like to stay in their home. She protested and went straight to Howe's residence (Cadwalader House) across the street from her home (Loxley House). Prior to her meeting Howe, a British officer introduced himself as Captain William Barrington of the 7th Regiment of Foot (Royal Fusiliers). She was immediately taken aback by his Irish brogue and his name Barrington, which was her maiden name. He told her that he was from Dublin and in the course of the conversation, she discovered that he was her second cousin. She explained to him the situation and he stated that he would take up her case with Howe immediately. They both walked into the residence and were taken in to see Howe, who agreed to let her stay, but that he and his staff would use the large house parlor for staff meetings. They were permitted to remain, as Quakers were known to be unsupportive of the war, even on the side of the colonies, and therefore posed no apparent risk to the British army.

On December 2, 1777, Lydia received a request that she and her family retire early, by 8 o'clock. She was told that she would be awakened when the soldiers were finished so she could let them out. Lydia pretended to go to sleep, but instead listened to the soldiers through the door. She learned that British troops were being ordered to leave the city on December 4 to make a surprise attack on the Continental Army camped at White Marsh, led by George Washington. Lydia snuck back to bed and pretended to be asleep until the officer, Captain John André, knocked three times at her door to awaken her to follow them out and extinguish the candles.

Lydia decided not to share this information with her husband. The following morning she was given permission by General Howe to cross British lines in order to go to Frankford to get flour. Lydia dropped off her empty bag at the mill and then headed toward the American camp. Along the way she met an American officer, Colonel Craig of the Light Horse, and told him about the impending British attack so that he might warn Washington. After the warning, Lydia made her way back to the mill, picked up her flour and started her journey home. After the British troops attempted their attack and realized that the Americans were waiting for them, fully armed and expecting the assault, the officer questioned Lydia and asked if anyone was awake on the night of the meeting, because it was obvious that someone had betrayed them. Lydia denied any knowledge of this and was not further questioned. A quote from the officer who questioned Lydia: "We were betrayed, for, on arriving near the encampment of General Washington, we found his cannon mounted, his troops under arms and so prepared at every point to receive us that we were compelled to march back, without injuring our enemy, like a parcel of fools."

=== First-hand account ===
In the Autumn of 1777 the American Army lay some time at White Marsh. I was then Commissary Gen l of Prisoners, and managed the Intelligence of the Army. — I was reconnoitering along the Lines near the City of Philadelphia. — I dined at a small Post at the rising Sun about three miles from the City. — After Dinner a little poor looking insignificant Old Woman came in & solicited leave to go into the Country to buy some flour — While we were asking some Questions, she walked up to me and put into my hands a dirty old needle book, with various small pockets in it. surprised at this, I told her to return, she should have an answer — On Opening the needlebook, I could not find any thing till I got to the last Pocket, Where I found a piece of Paper rolled up into the form of a Pipe Shank. — on unrolling it I found information that General Howe was coming out the next morning with 5000 Men — 13 pieces of Cannon — Baggage Waggons, and 11 Boats on Waggon Wheels. On comparing this with other information I found it true, and immediately rode Post to head Quarters —

A contemporary account of Lydia Darrah highlights several grist mills on the Frankford Creek; also a tavern named the Rising Sun next to Frankford's main grist mill. This was not the same Rising Sun Tavern mentioned in Boudinot's Journal.

British Intelligence agents became aware of the "bag of flour" trick a bit too late. On December 6, 1777, after the British returned from Whitemarsh, a message was published in the Philadelphia newspaper about "a poor woman, whom we both know" traveling to the Frankford Mill:

The following letter was found in a bag of Indian meal, which was picked up on Saturday the fourteenth of last month, was supposed to have been dropped by some of the women who were coming into town, when the skirmish happened between the pickets.

== Later life ==
In June 1778, British troops left Philadelphia, and Darragh's children returned to their family home. William Darragh died on June 8, 1783. Charles lost his membership to the Society of Friends on April 27, 1781. Lydia lost her membership on August 29, 1783. In 1786, Lydia and the children moved into a new house, and she ran a store until her death on December 28, 1789. They are both buried in the Quakers' burying ground at Fourth and Arch Streets, not far from their home.

== Legacy ==
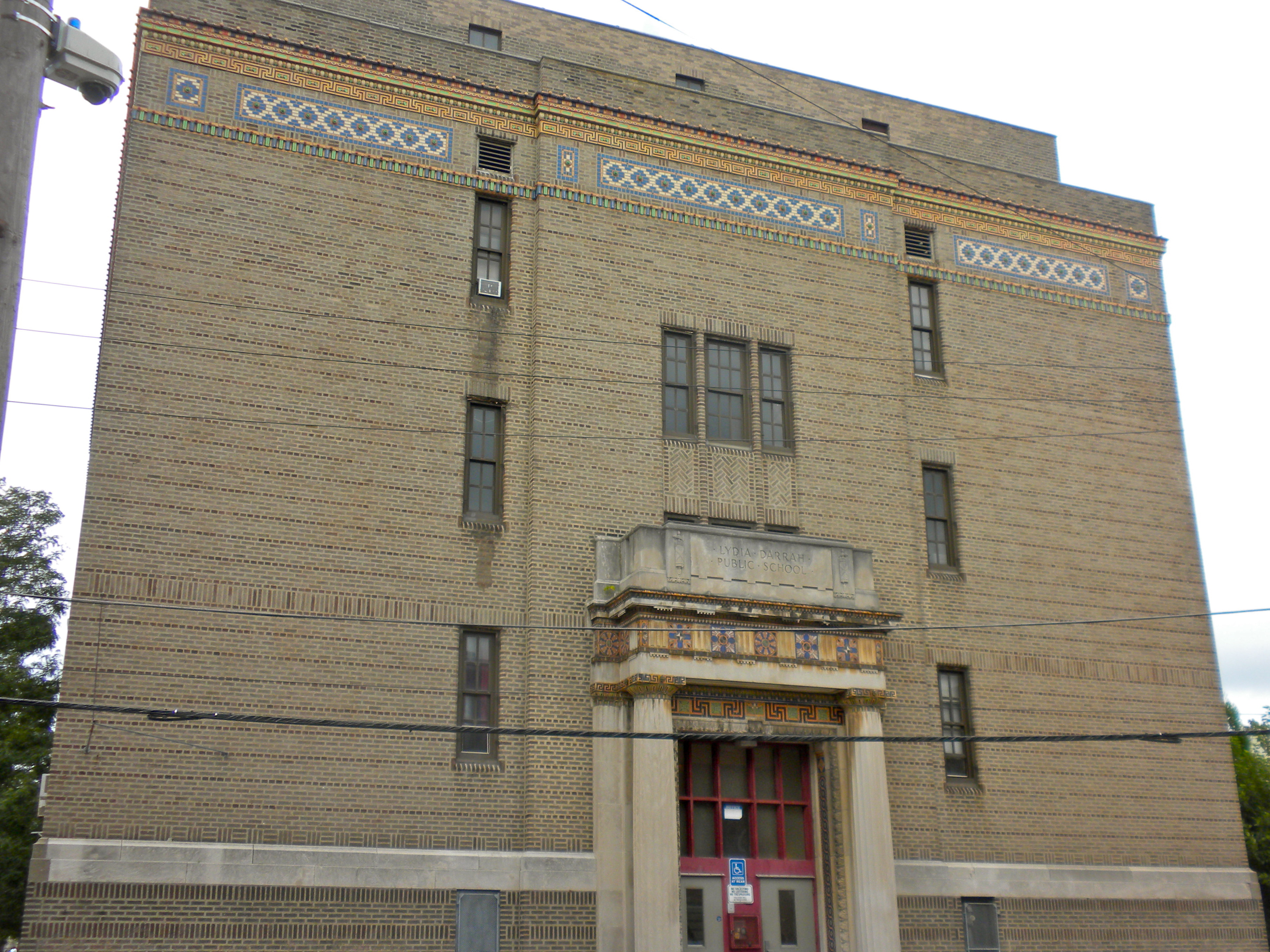
Lydia Darrah School at 708–732 North 17th St., in the Fairmount neighborhood of North Philadelphia, has been on the NRHP since December 4, 1986.

In 2013, the National Society of the Sons of the American Revolution created the Lydia Darragh Medal. The Lydia Darragh Medal may be awarded by the incumbent President General, Vice President General, State Society President or Chapter President to the woman who has provided the most significant service to him during his term of office. The medal recognizes the assistance of the women who work behind the scenes supporting SAR programs.

Darrah Street in Northeast Philadelphia is named in her honor.

== See also ==
- Intelligence in the American Revolutionary War
- Intelligence operations in the American Revolutionary War
- Agent 355
