= Fort Washington State Park =

State park in Pennsylvania, United States

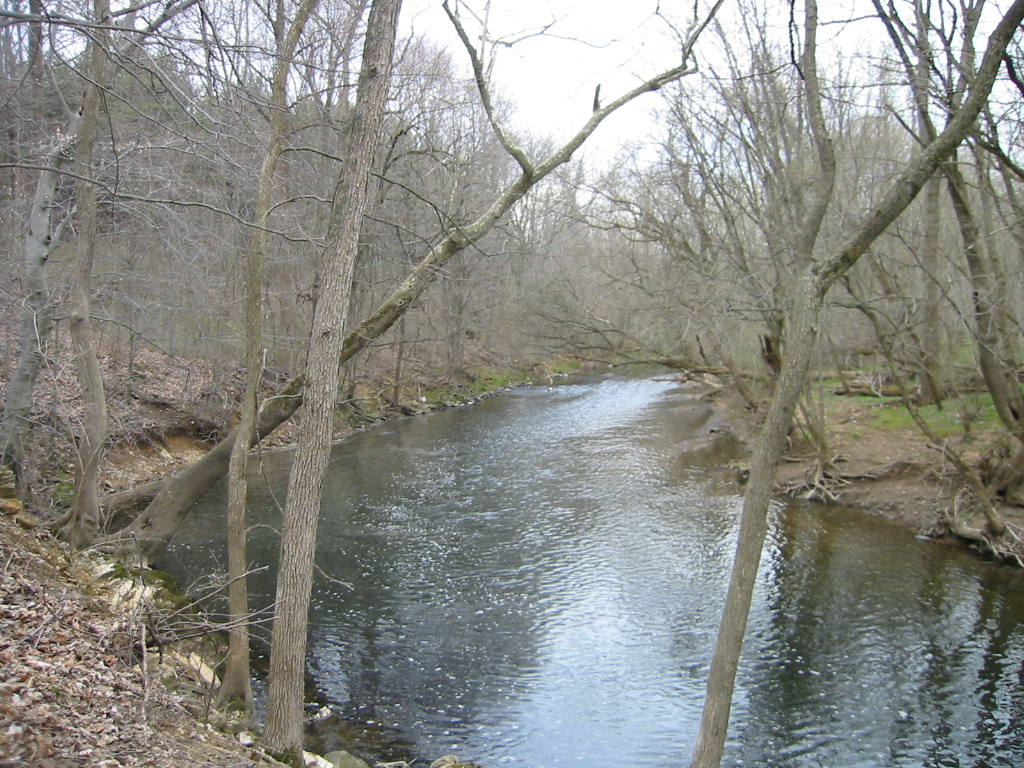
- Wissahickon Creek runs through Fort Washington State Park.

- Location within Philadelphia Location within Pennsylvania
- Interactive map of Fort Washington State Park
- Location: Montgomery County, Pennsylvania, United States
- Coordinates: 40°07′49″N 75°13′04″W (office)
- Area: 493 acres (200 ha)
- Elevation: 328 feet (100 m)
- Established: 1953 (state park)
- Administrator: Pennsylvania Department of Conservation and Natural Resources
- Website: Official website
- Pennsylvania State Parks

Fort Washington State Park is a 493-acre (200 ha) Pennsylvania state park in Springfield and Whitemarsh Townships in Montgomery County, Pennsylvania. The park is noted for the springtime flowering of dogwood trees, and is popular with families for picnics and hiking. It is approximately 17 miles (27 km) north of Philadelphia, 2 miles (3.2 km) from exit 339 of the Pennsylvania Turnpike.

== History ==
=== American Revolutionary War ===
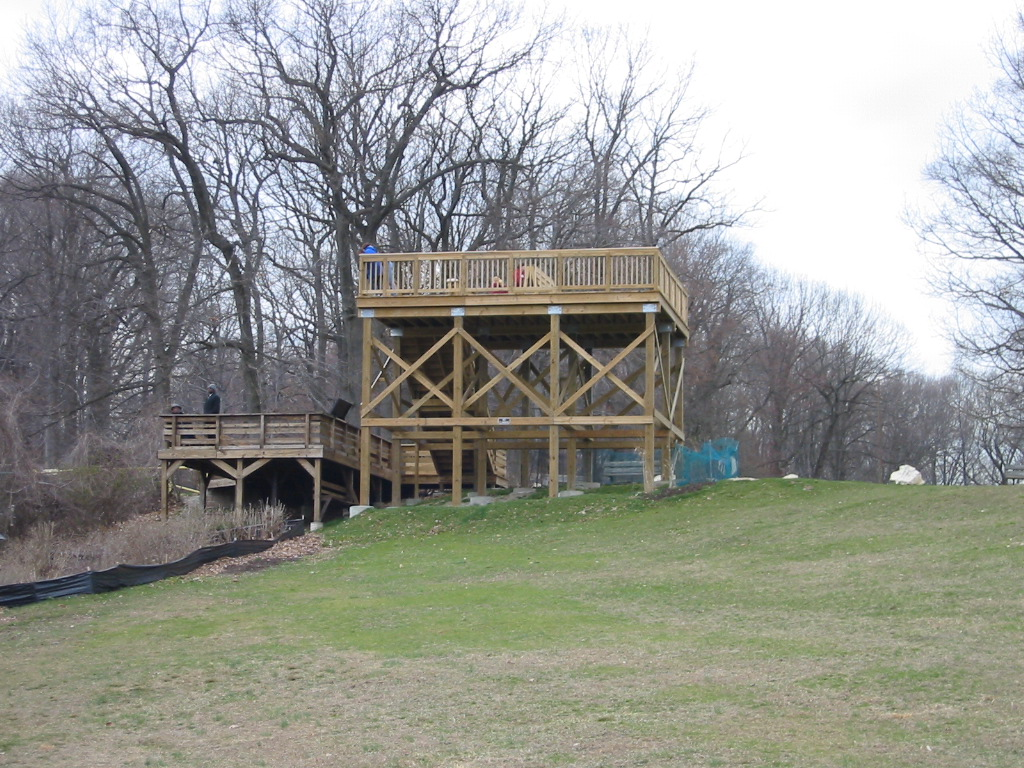
The observation deck at Fort Washington State Park overlooks the Wissahickon Creek, a National Natural Landmark

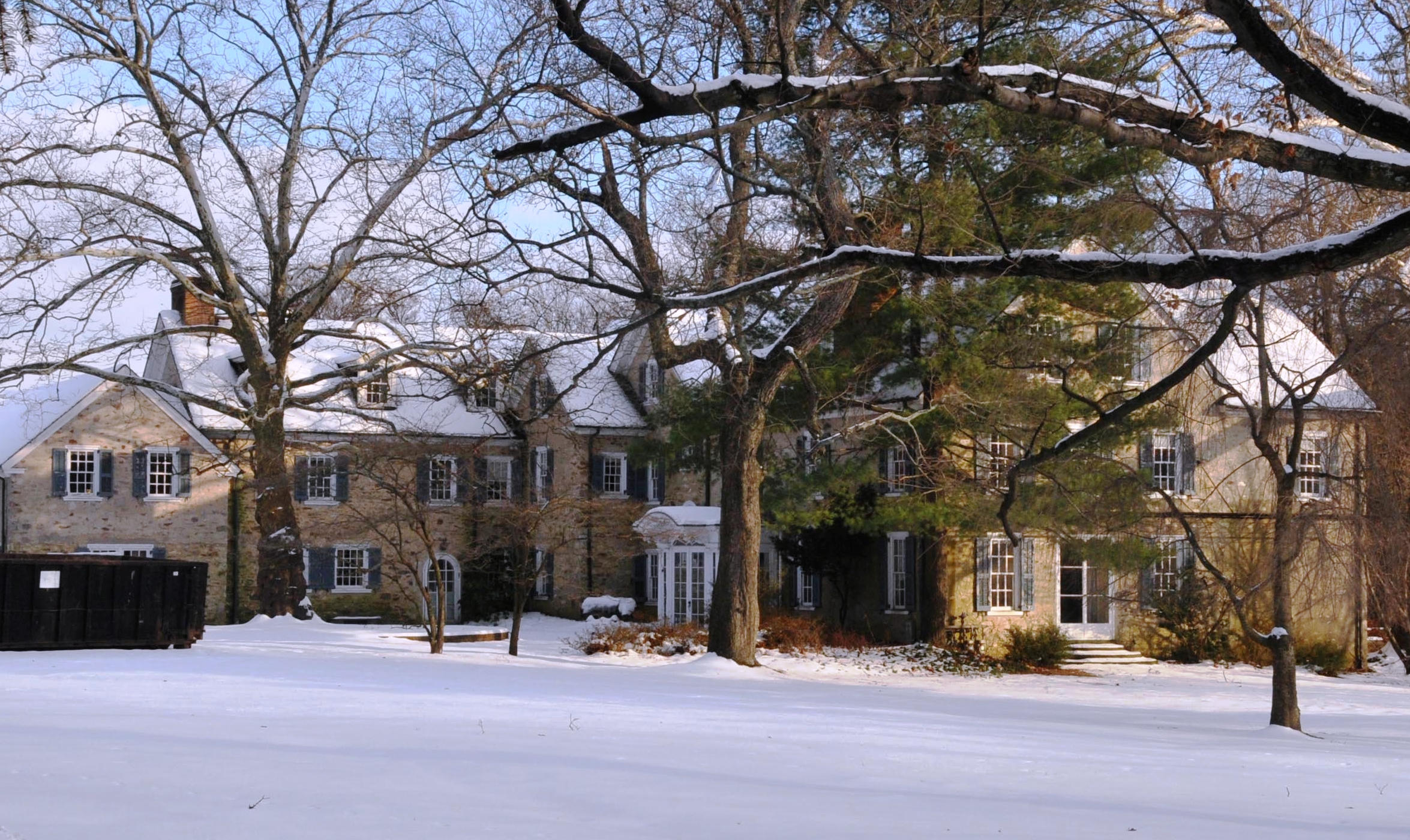
Emlen House, George Washington's headquarters in November and December 1777

Both Fort Washington State Park and the neighboring town are named for American defenses and encampment established here in 1777, during the Philadelphia campaign of the American Revolutionary War.

After Washington's defeat at the Battle of Germantown, his 11,000 troops were encamped in this area from November 11, 1777 to December 11, 1777, after which they marched to Valley Forge for winter quarters.

From December 5–8, 1777, the Battle of White Marsh was fought in the immediate vicinity. The park's Fort Hill marks the spot where a temporary fort once stood. The Pennsylvania militia under Generals Armstrong, Cadwalader and Irvine held positions on what is today called Militia Hill.

=== Park's establishment ===
The park was established by Philadelphia's Fairmount Park Commission in the early 1920s. The commission, in conjunction with the Pennsylvania Department of Forests and Waters, administered the park until 1953. That year, an act of state legislature transferred responsibility of the park to the Pennsylvania Department of Forests and Waters (known today as the Pennsylvania Department of Conservation and Natural Resources).

Recreational activities at Fort Washington State Park include Disc golf, fishing, hiking, dog walking, bird and wildlife watching, sledding, cross-country skiing and picnicking. From September 1 to October 31, an organized "Hawk Watch" takes place in which viewers can observe all 16 species of raptors that migrate on the East Coast from the park's observation deck. Hunting is prohibited at Fort Washington State Park.
