= Battle of White Marsh =

1777 battle of the American Revolutionary War

- Part of the American Revolutionary War
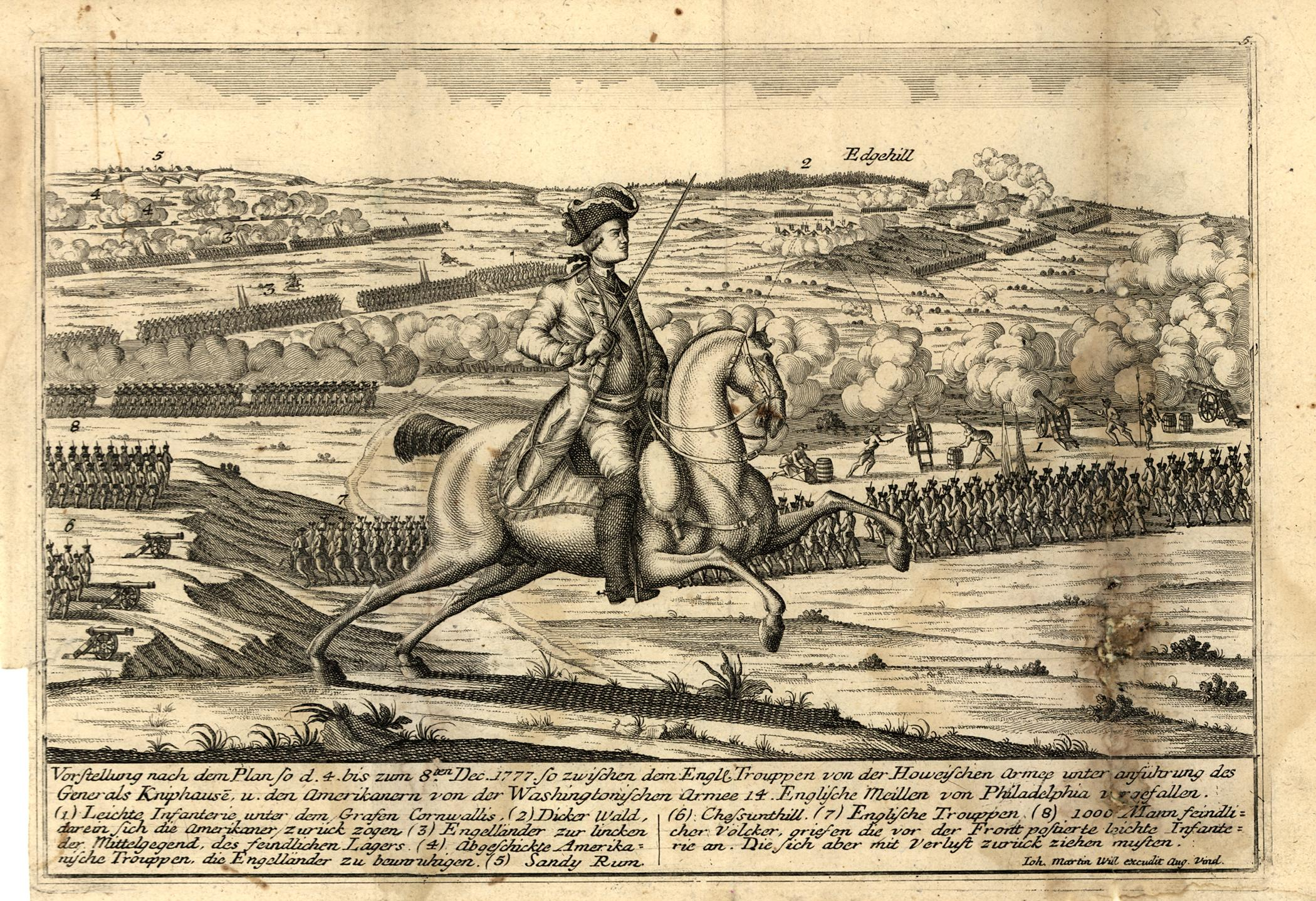
- Engraving of the battle
Date	December 5–8, 1777
Location	Whitemarsh Township, Pennsylvania, Springfield Township, Pennsylvania, Upper Dublin Township, Pennsylvania, Fort Washington, Pennsylvania 40.12°N 75.23°W
Result	Inconclusive

Belligerents
United States	Great Britain: Hesse-Kassel

Commanders and leaders
(United States) George Washington	(Kingdom of Great Britain) Sir William Howe (Kingdom of Great Britain) Lord Cornwallis (Hesse) Wilhelm Knyphausen

Strength
9,500	10,000

Casualties and losses
150 killed or wounded 54 captured	19 killed 60 wounded 33 missing 238 deserted

The Battle of White Marsh or Battle of Edge Hill was a battle of the Philadelphia campaign of the American Revolutionary War fought December 5–8, 1777, in the area surrounding Whitemarsh Township, Pennsylvania. The battle, which took the form of a series of skirmish actions, was the last major engagement of 1777 between British and American forces.

George Washington, commander-in-chief of the American revolutionary forces, spent the weeks after his defeat at the Battle of Germantown encamped with the Continental Army in various locations throughout upper Philadelphia County (now Montgomery County), just north of the British-occupied city. In early November, the Americans established an entrenched position approximately 16 miles (26 km) north of Philadelphia along the Wissahickon Creek and Sandy Run, primarily situated on several hills between Old York Road and Bethlehem Pike. From here, Washington monitored British troop movements in Philadelphia and evaluated his options.

On December 4, Gen. Sir William Howe, the commander-in-chief of British forces in North America, led a sizable contingent of troops out of Philadelphia in one last attempt to destroy Washington and the Continental Army before the onset of winter. After a series of skirmishes, Howe called off the attack and returned to Philadelphia without engaging Washington in a decisive conflict.

With the British back in Philadelphia, Washington was able to march his troops to winter quarters at Valley Forge.

== Background and movement to battle ==
After their October 4, 1777, defeat at the Battle of Germantown, Washington's army retreated along Skippack Pike to Pawling's Mill, beyond the Perkiomen Creek, where they remained encamped until October 8. They then marched east on Skippack Pike, turned left on Forty-Foot Road (present-day Old Forty-Foot Road), and marched to Sumneytown Pike, where they camped on the property of Frederick Wampole near Kulpsville in Towamencin Township. While there, Brig. Gen. Francis Nash died of wounds incurred at Germantown and was buried in the Mennonite Meeting Cemetery. Washington remained at Towamencin for one week, gathering supplies and waiting to see if Howe would move against him. On October 16, Washington moved his forces to Methacton Hill in Worcester Township. After learning of Howe's withdrawal from Germantown to Philadelphia, Washington moved his army to Whitpain, 5 miles (8.0 km) closer to Philadelphia, on October 20. On October 29, Washington's army numbered 8,313 Continentals and 2,717 militia, although the terms of enlistment of many soldiers from Maryland and Virginia were due to expire. With his ranks reinforced, Washington dispatched a brigade to assist with the defense of Forts Mifflin and Mercer, on the Delaware River.

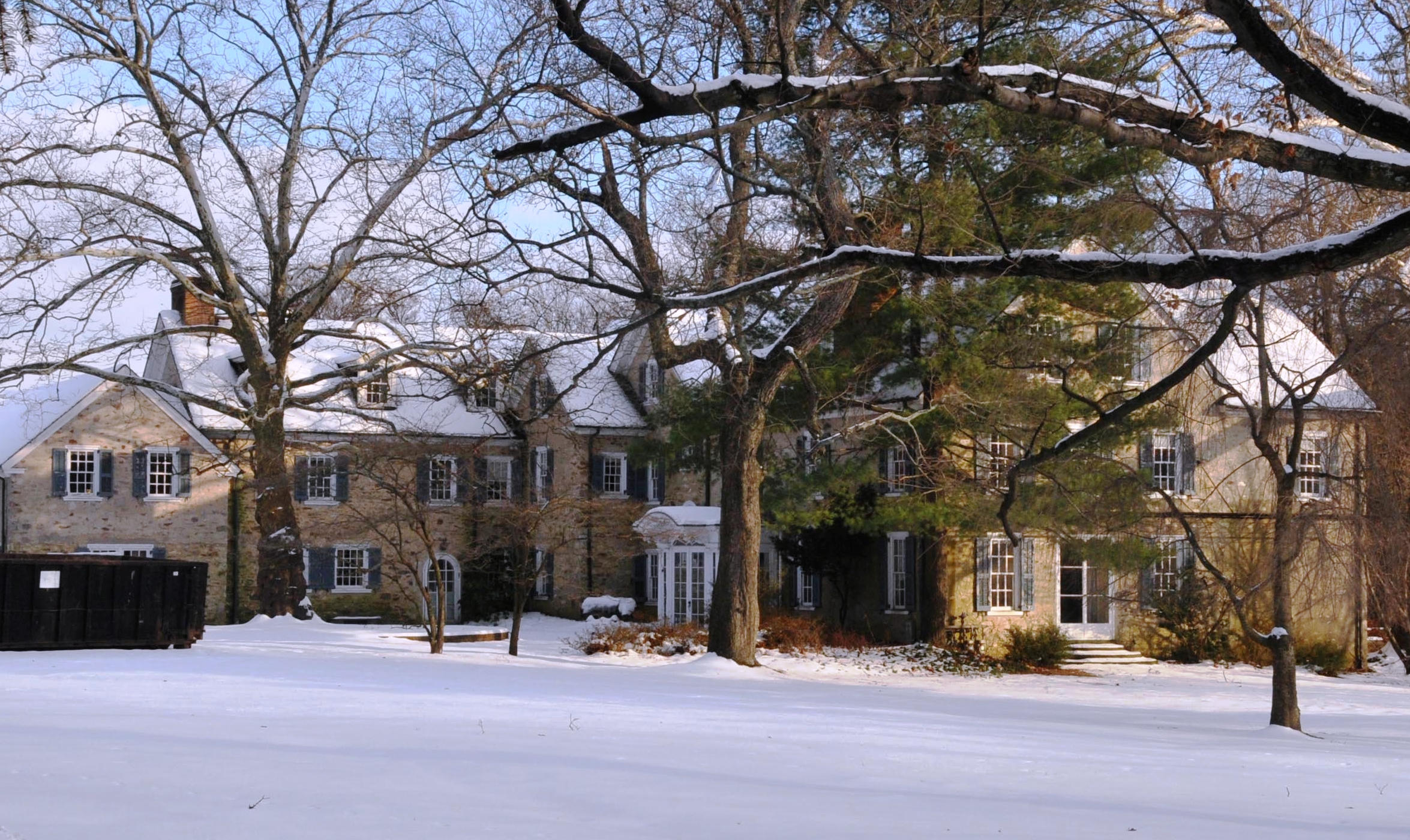
Emlen House, Washington's headquarters at White Marsh, in 2007

On November 2, at the recommendation of his council of war, Washington marched his forces to White Marsh, approximately 13 miles (21 km) northwest of Philadelphia. Washington established headquarters at the Emlen House, where he and his aides were quartered. At White Marsh, the army began to build redoubts and defensive works, including abatis in front of their encampment.

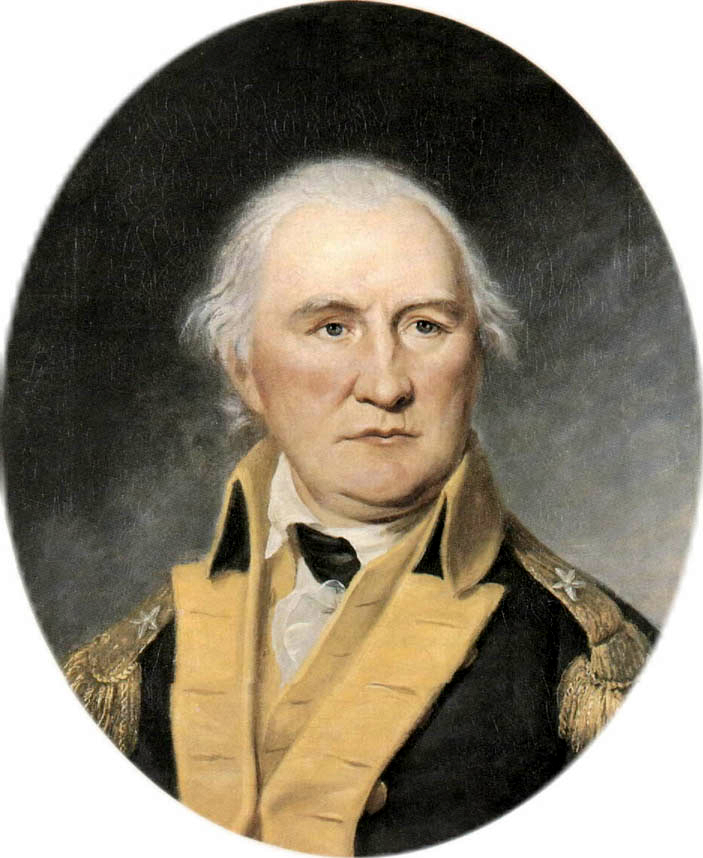
Colonel Daniel Morgan

After the surrender of British Lt. Gen. John Burgoyne after the Battles of Saratoga, Washington began drawing troops from the north, including the 1,200 men of Varnum's Rhode Island brigade, and about 1,000 more men from various Pennsylvania, Maryland and Virginia units. Maj. Gen. Horatio Gates sent Col. Daniel Morgan's rifle corps, and the brigades of Paterson and Glover. With these additional forces, and the pending onset of winter, Washington had to face the problem of supplying his army. A quarter of the troops were barefooted, and there were very few blankets or warm clothing. Washington became so desperate that he even offered a reward of $10 to the person who could supply the "best substitute for shoes, made of raw hides". Morale was so low and desertion so common that Washington offered a pardon on October 24 to all deserters who returned by January 1. Washington's loss of Philadelphia and inactivity brought criticism from Congress, who pressured him to attack the city. He therefore called a council of war on November 24 which voted against an attack 11 to 4. Nonetheless, Washington rode out the next day to view the British defenses, which turned to be stronger than he had expected.

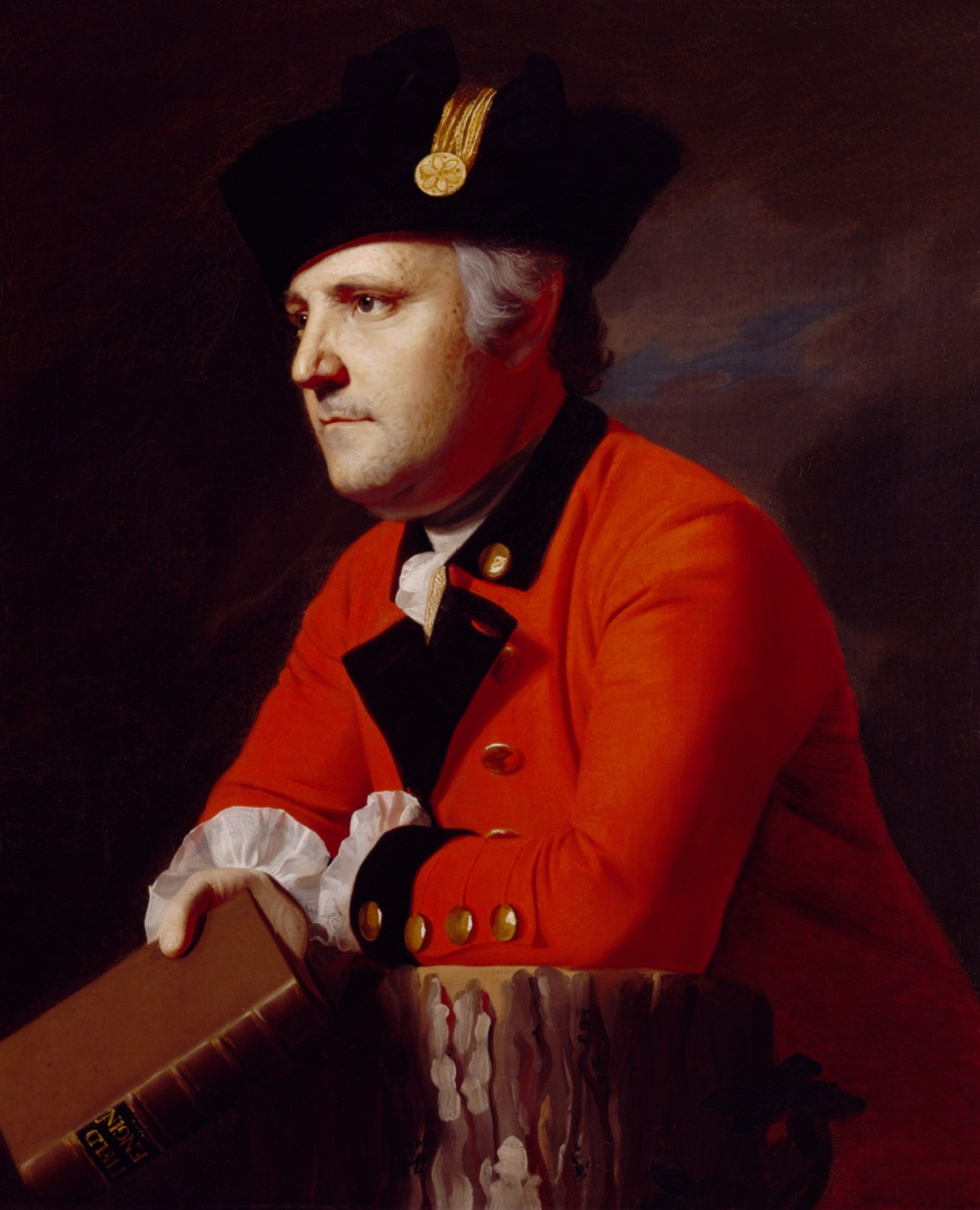
Capt. John Montresor was responsible for establishing the defenses around British-occupied Philadelphia.

On October 19, Howe withdrew the British forces from Germantown and focused on the defense of Philadelphia. British military engineer Capt. John Montresor supervised the building of a series of fourteen formidable redoubts that began at Upper Ferry, along the Schuylkill River, and extended eastward to the shores of the Delaware River, just north of Philadelphia. Howe took advantage of his time in Philadelphia to raise additional forces from the loyalist population in the region. Newly-promoted Maj. John Graves Simcoe reinforced his unit, the Queen's Rangers, which had lost over a quarter of its men at the Battle of Brandywine. William Allen, Jr., the son of notable loyalist William Allen, raised the 1st Battalion of Pennsylvania Loyalists, and was made its lieutenant colonel. Loyalist James Chalmers raised the 1st Battalion of Maryland Loyalists, and was given its command. Recruitment also took place among the city's Irish Catholic population, with the formation of the Irish Catholic Volunteers, and in the counties immediately surrounding Philadelphia. In mid-November, the fall of Forts Mifflin and Mercer effectively ended American control of the Delaware River, and much-needed supplies began arriving at the city's docks, along with 2,000 additional British soldiers.

The weeks with two major armies sitting within miles of each other were not without conflict, and a petite guerre ensued in the no man's land between White Marsh and Northern Liberties. Minor skirmishes between light troops increased in intensity throughout November, with almost daily losses being incurred by both the British and the Americans. In retaliation, on November 22, Howe ordered his troops to set fire to several large country houses in the Germantown area, including Fair Hill, a mansion and country estate that had previously belonged to John Dickinson. Eleven houses in all were burned to the ground, and residents of Philadelphia climbed onto rooftops and church steeples to watch the spectacle. Just one day earlier, crowds had gathered to watch the burning of Commodore John Hazelwood's Pennsylvania Navy in the Delaware. On the same morning the mansions were burned, an earthquake struck Philadelphia, and was felt as far away as Lancaster. On November 27, an aurora borealis lit up the night skies. The two events caused quite a stir among both the residents of Philadelphia and the troops, British and American alike, who took them as an ominous sign of things to come.

By early December, Howe decided, despite having written to Colonial Secretary Lord George Germain requesting to be relieved of his command, that he was in a position to make one last attempt to destroy Washington's army before the onset of winter, and he began preparations for an attack on the American forces. Washington's intelligence network in Philadelphia, led by Maj. John Clark, became aware of British plans to surprise the Americans. According to a historically unsubstantiated story, Howe's movements were revealed to the Americans by a Quaker woman named Lydia Darragh, who overheard British officers quartered in her house discussing Howe's plan, and crossed the British lines to deliver this information to Col. Elias Boudinot of the Continental Army, who was at the Rising Sun Tavern between Germantown and Northern Liberties, (located at the present day intersection of Germantown Avenue and Old York Road) attempting to secure provisions. Boudinot immediately relayed this information to Washington, and the Continental Army was ready when Howe, with a force of approximately 10,000 men, marched out of Philadelphia just prior to midnight on December 4. The advance column, led by Lt. Gen. Lord Cornwallis, headed up Germantown Pike. A second column, led by Lt. Gen. von Knyphausen, marched toward the American left.

== First day of battle ==
A German map of the Battle of White Marsh.

Just after midnight on December 5, Cornwallis' vanguard, which consisted of two British light infantry battalions, skirmished with an American cavalry patrol under the command of Capt. Allen McLane near Three Mile Run on Skippack Road. McLane sent a messenger to Washington, alerting him of the British movements. While the main body of the British troops marched through Germantown, Beggarstown, and Flourtown, American alarm cannons were sounded and positions manned. At 3:00 am, the British halted on Chestnut Hill, just south of the American defenses, and waited for daybreak. During the night, Washington ordered his troops to build additional campfires to deceive the British. "...[I]t looked as if fifty thousand men were encamped there. By day we could see this was merely a trick...," wrote Hessian Maj. Carl von Bauermeister.

Expecting a confrontation, Washington took the precaution of striking his tents before sunrise, and sent the heavy baggage north to Trappe. He then dispatched troops to find out the size and intent of the British column. Brig. Gen. James Irvine of the Pennsylvania militia took 600 men and marched them through the Wissahickon Valley toward Chestnut Hill. Brig. Gen. James Potter's brigade of about 1,000 Pennsylvania militia and Webb's 2nd Connecticut Regiment of 200 men moved to screen Irvine's right. Around noon, Irvine's detachment encountered the British light infantry on the north side of Chestnut Hill. The Pennsylvania militia got off the first volley, but were soon routed by the British. While attempting to rally his fleeing troops, Irvine had three fingers shot off, and was taken prisoner when he fell from his horse. Potter's brigade immediately fled, despite orders to advance and skirmish with the British light infantry. The 2nd Connecticut made a brief stand, killing three and wounding eleven, including British Capt. Sir James Murray-Pulteney.

British Lt. Col. Robert Abercromby decided to push his advantage after scattering Irvine's troops. He pushed north and captured St. Thomas Episcopal Church, located on a hillock. Howe arrived a short while later, and ascended to the top of the church's bell tower in an attempt to view the American positions. Deciding the American defenses were too strong to attack with his present force, he opted to shell their defenses with artillery fire; however, his guns did not have the range to hit Washington's defenses. His forces camped on Chestnut Hill that night, and planned a new way of attack for the following day.

== Second and third days of battle ==
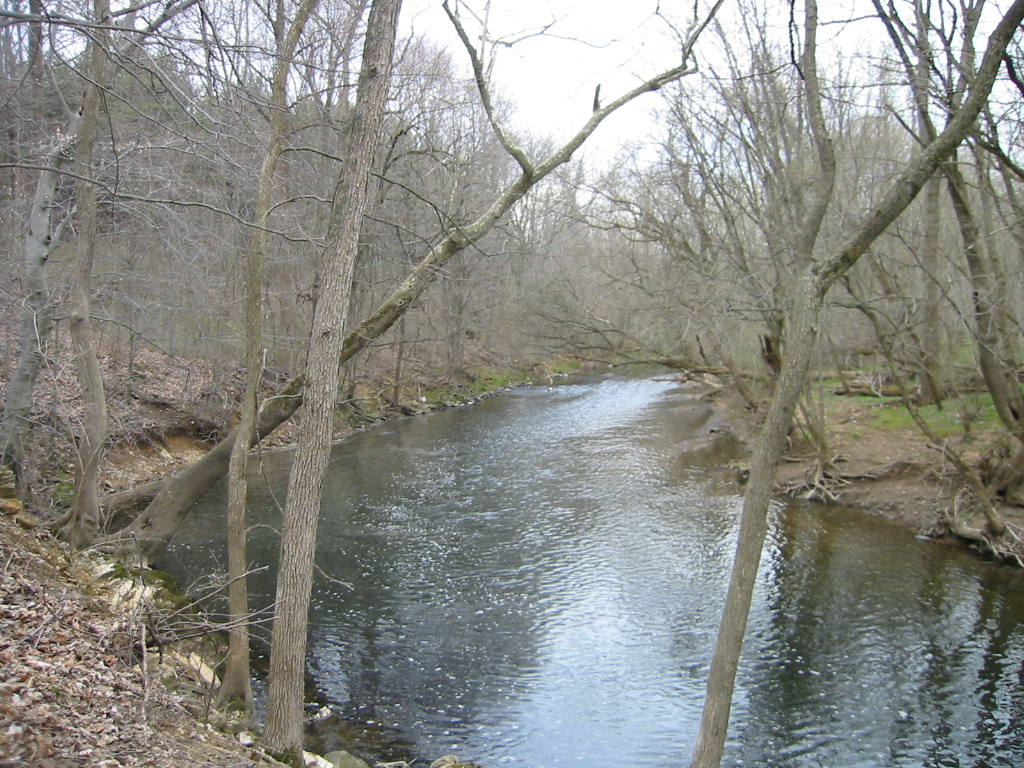
The Wissahickon Creek, near the encampment of the Pennsylvania militia.

The two armies spent December 6 watching each other across the Wissahickon Valley. Howe hoped that Washington would leave his positions to attack the British; Washington did not, preferring instead to let the British do the maneuvering. By day's end, Howe decided upon a flanking movement toward the Americans' left, toward Jenkintown and Cheltenham Township, while Maj. Gen. Charles Grey's forces would create a distraction by attacking the American center.

Sometime after 1:00 am on December 7, Howe marched the British Army back through Germantown, and then to Jenkintown, where they remained until noon. As the British movements were concealed by a ridge on Chestnut Hill, Washington did not become aware of Howe's maneuvering until 8:00 am. He immediately moved Morgan's Rifle Corps. and Col. Mordecai Gist's Maryland militia eastward to cover his left flank. About a mile to the right of this detachment, Brig. Gen. James Potter's brigade of Pennsylvania militia, and Webb's 2nd Connecticut Regiment, under Lieut. Col. Isaac Sherman, proceeded down Limekiln Road toward Edge Hill. Movement of the British rear guard, including the Jägers and the Queen's Rangers, was hindered by the burning of the villages of Cresheim and Beggarstown by troops at the front of the column. Howe's right was now situated near the Abington Presbyterian Church. His main force moved to situate itself on Edge Hill, a ridge that ran parallel to, and a mile in front of, the American lines. Grey's column had broken off from the main column, and proceeded up Whitemarsh Church Road toward the American center.

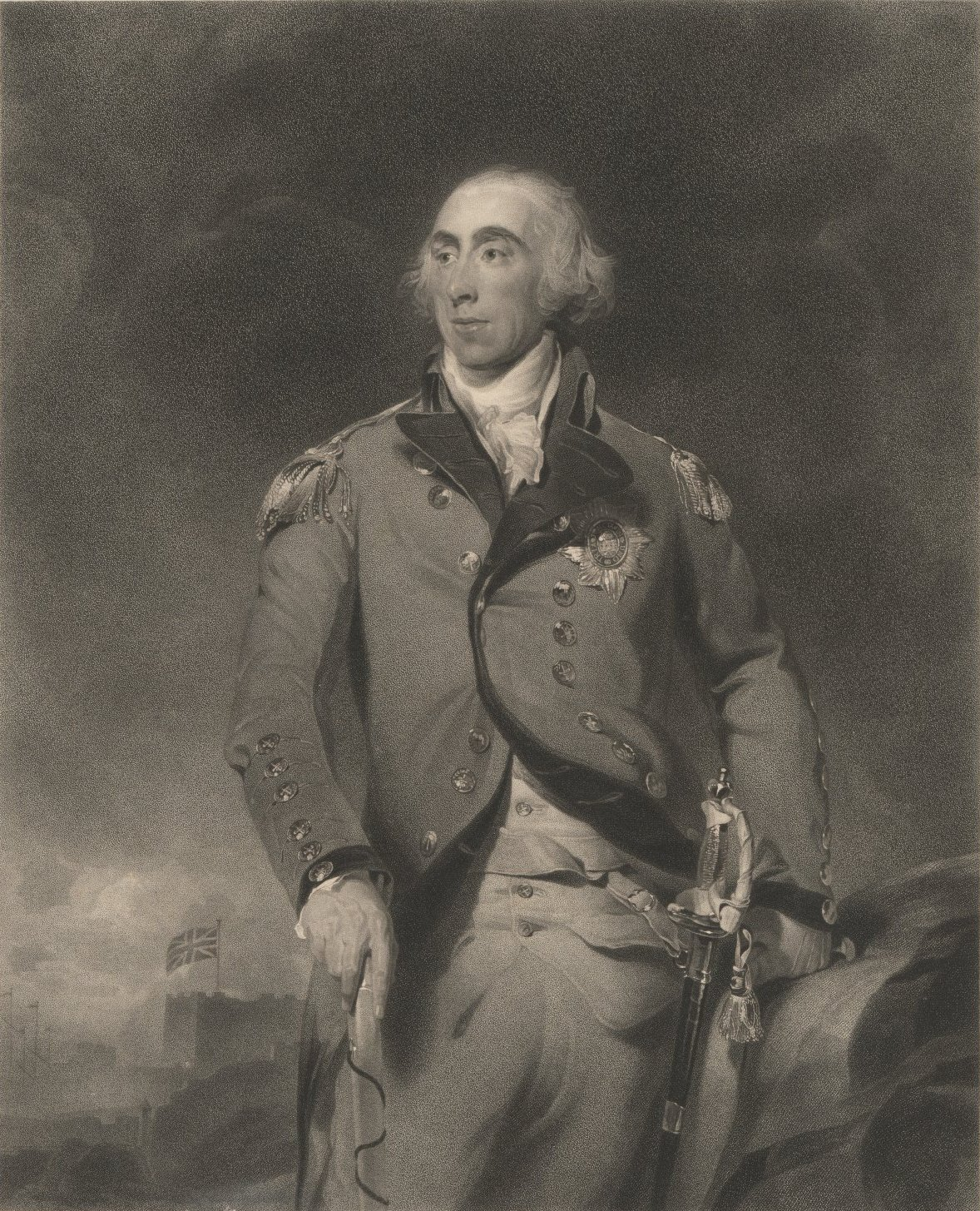
British Maj. Gen. Charles Grey, 1st Earl Grey

Gen. Grey had been instructed not to attack until he heard the sound of firing from Howe's column, but after several hours, he became impatient and decided to proceed on his own. He formed his column into three divisions, with the Queen's Rangers on the left, the Jägers on each side of the road, and the light infantry of the Guards on the right, and headed in the direction of Tyson's Tavern on Limekiln Road. As Grey advanced toward the American center, his troops took fire from American militia on Edge Hill. The militia were quickly routed, with between twenty and thirty killed, and fifteen of them taken as prisoners. Gens. John Cadwalader and Joseph Reed, out reconnoitering on horse near Twickenham, the country estate of Thomas Wharton Jr., attempted to rally Potter's fleeing Pennsylvania militia. Lieut. Col. Sherman, the officer in charge of the 2nd Connecticut Continentals, resented Reed's assumption of command, and later complained to Washington that it put "...Officers and Men into such confusion that it rendered it impossible to keep that regularity so necessary when going into Action." The British soon had them surrounded and outnumbered, and the Pennsylvania militia again panicked and fled. The 2nd Connecticut Continentals made a stand, firing between two and five rounds per man; Sherman only gave the order to retreat when the Jägers were within 15–20 yards of his position. At some point, Cadwalader and Reed became separated from the militia, and Reed's horse was shot out from under him. A body of Hessians charged at the two officers with bayonets, but Capt. McLane rode up with a few dragoons and ordered a charge that scattered the Hessians. McLane then took the two officers to safety.

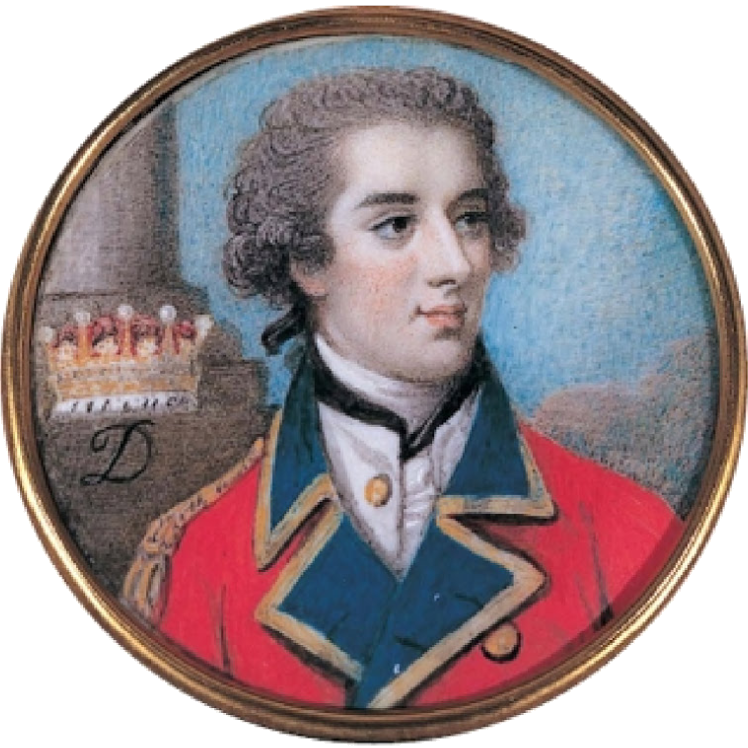
William Augustus West, Lord Cantelupe, c. 1778

The Pennsylvania militia fled in panic down Edge Hill, across Sandy Run, and toward the main American camp. Right behind them were men of the 2nd Connecticut, also in disorderly retreat. They were pursued to within yards of their encampment by the Queen's Rangers and Jägers, who then fell back and took a position on Edge Hill, between Grey's troops and Howe's main column.

Morgan's Rifle Corps and Gist's Maryland militia had taken position on Edge Hill, about a mile to the east of Grey's troops, and higher up on the ridge. A small group of Americans moved down to attack Col. Twistleton's Light Infantry of the Guards, but were quickly repulsed by the British. William Augustus West, Lord Cantelupe, who was stationed with the light infantry, noted that the 4th and 23rd Regiments engaged the Americans with 9 men killed and 19 wounded. British Maj. John André reported that one American was killed.

Meanwhile, the main body of Morgan's and Gist's troops engaged Howe's main column in dense woods, where they fought "Indian style", from tree to tree. The Maryland militia attacked Abercromby's 1st Light Infantry Battalion with unusual vigor: British officers, who were used to encountering militia who would flee at the first sign of battle, would later express admiration at the skill of Morgan's and Gist's men. Morgan's troops were not reinforced, and were forced to retreat back to the main camp after Cornwallis sent in the 33rd Regiment of Foot.

== British withdrawal ==
On the morning of December 8, British generals and engineers once again studied the American positions, looking for any advantage they could exploit in the American defenses. To the astonishment of both the British and the Americans, Howe decided to withdraw and return to Philadelphia. Despite being successful in two major skirmishes over the previous days, his maneuvering had not gotten as far around the American flank as he had hoped and his troops' provisions were running low. Also, the nights were getting colder and the troops had left their tentage and gear in Philadelphia.

Mark Boatner says that Howe "decided that Washington's defenses were too strong to warrant the risk of a general assault. At 2:00 pm, the British began their withdrawal, lighting numerous campfires—in a tactic similar to one used by Washington three days prior—to conceal their movements. An American reconnaissance party, led by Capt. McLane, discovered that Howe was marching back down Old York Road into Philadelphia and communicated this information back to Washington. Morgan's troops harassed the enemy's rear, in particular Grey's column, which was hindered by the weight of the artillery that it was transporting. A contingent of Hessians formed to oppose them with their fieldpieces and Morgan's troops retreated. The British arrived in Philadelphia later that day.

== Casualties ==
No American official casualty return from December 5 to 8 is known to exist. Some information, however, can be pieced together from various sources. For December 5, David Martin says that General Irvine's force took about 40 casualties, while a Loyalist officer with the British Army wrote that Irvine was captured along with 23 of his men. For December 6, Howard Peckham says that the Americans lost 30 killed, 40 wounded and 15 captured. The figure of 15 prisoners taken was confirmed by John André in his journal.

For December 7, Colonel John Laurens stated that "the loss of Morgan's riflemen was 27 killed and wounded", while John Donaldson, an American cavalryman wrote that "Morgan had 44 killed & wounded & among them was Major Morris a brave & gallant officer" This reference was to Major Joseph Morris of the 1st New Jersey Regiment, so Donaldson's figure was evidently for the whole force under Morgan's command, while Laurens' figure was for the Corps of Riflemen only. Benson Lossing confirms that "twenty-seven were killed and wounded in Morgan's Corps", while Major Morris was badly wounded and the Maryland Militia lost "16 or 17" wounded. For December 8, David Martin says that the Maryland Militia lost 20 killed or wounded and 15 prisoners. From these sources, the aggregate American loss from December 5–8 would appear to have been 16 killed or wounded and 24 captured on the 5th; 70 killed or wounded and 15 captured on the 6th; 44 killed or wounded on the 7th and 20 killed or wounded and 15 captured on the 8th. This gives 150 killed or wounded and 54 captured, for a total loss of 204 men.

Lord Cantelupe wrote in his diary that "the number of killed & wounded on our side amount to one hundred & twenty, one officer killed. Cantelupe's figure agrees approximately with Howe's official casualty return for "the different skirmishes from 4th to 8th December", which gives 19 killed, 60 wounded and 33 missing. David Martin gives the total British loss, including deserters, as 350, which would suggest that 238 men deserted.

== Aftermath ==
Washington, frustrated at not being able to confront Howe in a more decisive action, wrote in his report to Henry Laurens, president of Congress, "I sincerely wish, that they had made an Attack; the Issue in all probability, from the disposition of our Troops and the strong situation of our Camp, would have been fortunate and happy. At the same time I must add that reason, prudence, and every principle of policy, forbade us quitting our post to attack them. Nothing but Success would have justified the measure, and this could not be expected from their position."

On December 11, the Continental Army left White Marsh for Valley Forge. It took the soldiers eight days to make the 13-mile (21 km) journey. The following April, Howe resigned his post and returned to Britain, and was replaced by Gen. Sir Henry Clinton. Following France's entry into the war, the British evacuated Philadelphia overland the following spring, and while en route to New York City, they were attacked by Washington at the Battle of Monmouth.

Remains of the American redoubts were visible near Farmar Mill, as were vestiges of stone chimneys from the soldier's makeshift huts, as late as 1860. The battle is alluded to in Sally Wister's Journal, and the author later views the remains of the nearby camp. Fort Washington State Park, which encompasses a portion of the area occupied by the American forces, was established in the early 1920s by Philadelphia's Fairmount Park Commission and is today managed by the Pennsylvania Department of Conservation and Natural Resources. The park's Fort Hill marks the spot where a temporary fort once stood at the western end of the American position. The Pennsylvania Militia (under Gens. Armstrong, Cadwalader and Irvine) held positions on the park's Militia Hill. Nearby, Emlen House, Washington's headquarters between November 2 and December 11, remains standing despite destructive modernization in 1854.

== See also ==
- American Revolutionary War § British northern strategy fails. Places 'Battle of White Marsh' in overall sequence and strategic context.
