= Upper Dublin School District =

School district in Pennsylvania

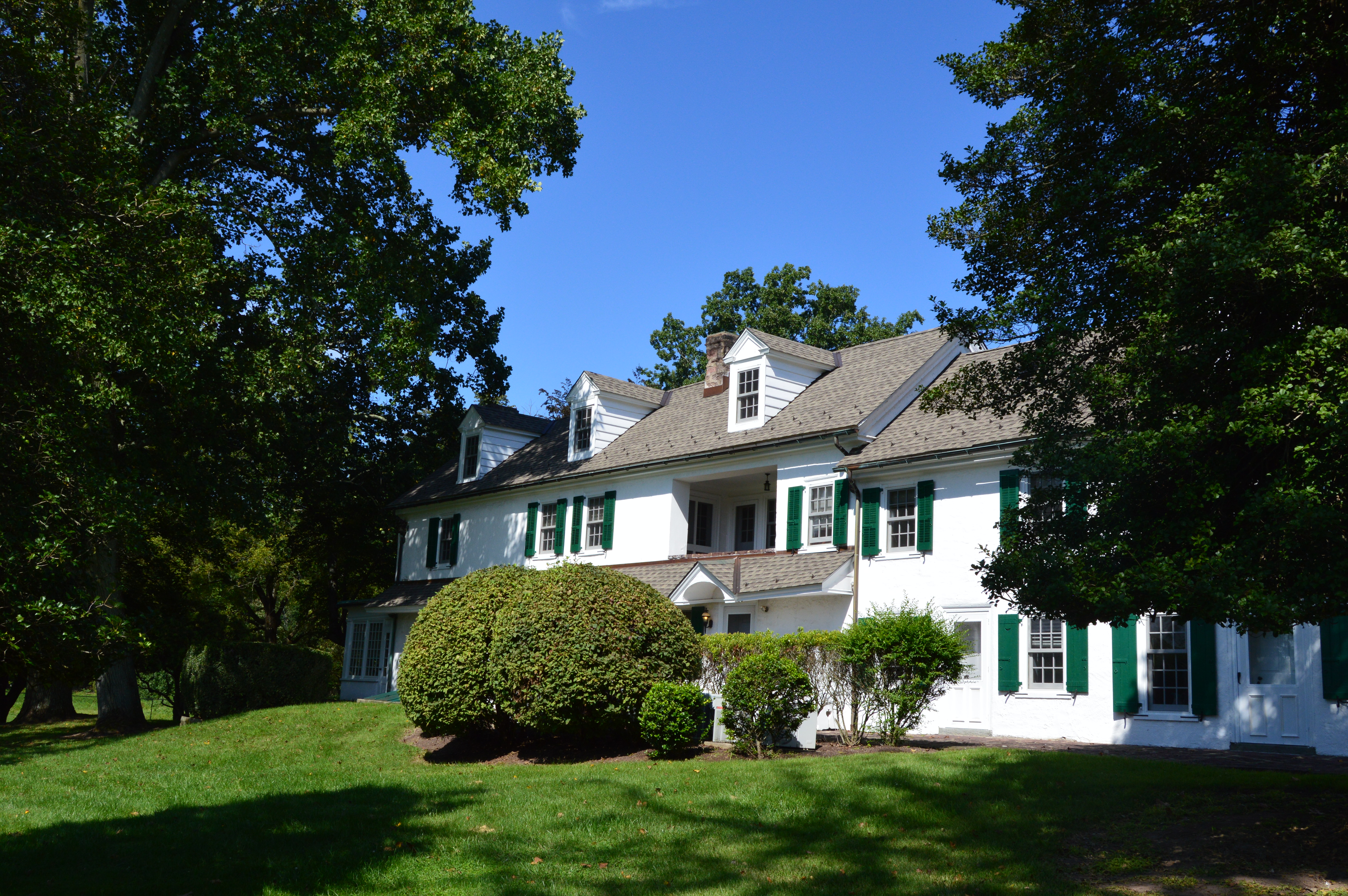
- Upper Dublin School District Administration Building, September 2017

Location
- Upper Dublin Township; Montgomery County; Pennsylvania United States

District information
- Type: Public
- Grades: K - 12
- Superintendent: Laurie J. Smith
- Schools: 6

Students and staff
- Athletic conference: PIAA District 1
- District mascot: Clyde the Cardinal
- Colors: Cardinal and Gray

Other information
- Website: www.udsd.org

Upper Dublin School District is located in Upper Dublin Township, Montgomery County, in the Commonwealth of Pennsylvania.

== Overview ==
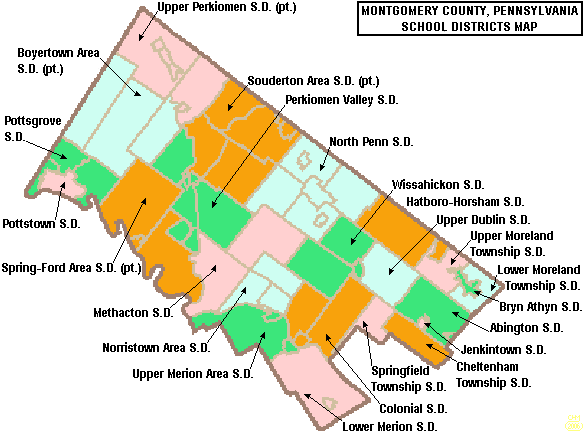
Map of Montgomery County, Pennsylvania Public School Districts. Upper Dublin School District is in blue in the southeast part of the county.

The school district operates four elementary schools, one middle school, and one high school, and serves students in grades K-12. The professional staff has an average of 16 years teaching experience and approximately 85% hold advanced degrees. The Upper Dublin School District is a separate governmental body from Upper Dublin Township, and is guided by the statutes of the Commonwealth of Pennsylvania. It has a board of directors elected by the residents with the power to levy taxes within state guidelines. A superintendent, currently Laurie J. Smith, is in charge of day-to-day operations as well as strategic planning. The district offices are located at 1580 Fort Washington Avenue, Maple Glen, PA 19002.

Class sizes of in major subject areas across the district are between 22 and 32 students. Facilities available to the district include a planetarium, technology labs, modern computerized libraries, and Robbins Park, a 38-acre nature preserve for environmental studies. The district also has subject area coordinators and supervisors, and Special Education programs running in all buildings.

== Accreditation and recognition ==
The four elementary schools: Fort Washington Elementary School, Maple Glen Elementary School, Jarrettown Elementary School, and Thomas Fitzwater Elementary School(K-5), the middle school Sandy Run Middle School(6-8), and the high school Upper Dublin High School(9-12) are all accredited by the Middle States Association of Colleges and Schools. Upper Dublin High School became a Blue Ribbon School of Excellence in 1996, recognized by the United States Department of Education.

Upper Dublin School District was the first school district in Pennsylvania to receive a K-12 paradigmatic accreditation from the Middle States Association of Colleges and Schools. Approximately 400 staff, community members, students, parents, and township officials were involved in the process.

== Parent-teacher groups ==
Parent volunteer groups are active in all six Upper Dublin schools. Parent-teacher groups sponsor special assembly programs, Child Watch programs, the Safe Home program (at the High School), school dances and fairs, after-school enrichment classes, and other activities and events. The Parent-Teacher Council is the umbrella organization for the parent-teacher groups. Parents are encouraged to join these organizations.

== Schools ==
=== Fort Washington Elementary School ===
Fort Washington Elementary School (FWES) is located in Fort Washington, PA. It serves students in Grades K-5.

- Shawn McAleer, Principal

=== Maple Glen Elementary School ===
Maple Glen Elementary School is located in Maple Glen, PA. It serves students in Grade K-5. It is the newest elementary school in the district; the school opened in September 2000. The single story building is 86,000 square feet (8,000 m^{2}). The school, which has been the home to roughly 450 students each year since its inception, was designed to be easily expanded to accommodate an ultimate enrollment of 600 students. The school is designed with a shingled roof and landscaping.

The interior of the school houses a full-size gymnasium, library, cafetorium, computer laboratory, and a networked technology infrastructure that is expandable and upgradeable. Each of the twenty five classrooms feature floor-to-ceiling bay windows, which provide views of the outdoors. Additional features include an art suite, equipped with a visual, wet and kiln room, band and vocal music rooms, a PTO room, health suite, guidance suite, and an expandable large group room. Smaller-sized seminar rooms are utilized by the speech and language pathologist, reading specialist, and school psychologist. All rooms, classrooms included, are equipped with a telephone, making communication convenient while adding another safety feature.

Several exterior courtyards serve as outdoor classrooms, and the school has two developmental playgrounds designed specifically for younger and older children, including disabled children.

- Nicholas Perez, Principal

=== Thomas Fitzwater Elementary School ===
Thomas Fitzwater Elementary School (TFES) is located in Willow Grove, PA, it opened in 1962 and serves students in Grade K-5. Its mascot is a cheetah named Speedy. A statue named "The Swimmer II" previously stood in front of the building, but has been taken down by staff for remodeling. It is named for colonial settler Thomas Fitzwater who lived in the area.

- Hannah Kim, Principal

=== Jarrettown Elementary School ===
Jarrettown Elementary School is located in Dresher, PA. It serves students in grades K-5 and has nearly 500 students.

As of January 2026, Michael Ridout is the principal of Jarrettown Elementary School.

=== Sandy Run Middle School ===
Sandy Run Middle School is located in Dresher, PA. It serves approximately 940 students in grades 6-8. The building contains a planetarium, full size gym, second auxiliary gym, cafeteria, auditorium, and library.

After the original building was demolished for reconstruction, the new facility has the main wing which houses the administration, gyms, cafeteria, auditorium, and band rooms. There's also the academic wing which houses classrooms and the World Languages department, with each grade on a separate floor, as well as a collaboration space at the center of each floor for group purposes. Extracurriculars in the school include technology, computing, art, music, family and consumer sciences, and health and physical education.

=== Upper Dublin High School ===
- Daniel Ortiz, Principal
