= Jacob Kastner Loghouse =

Historic house in Pennsylvania, United States

- U.S. National Register of Historic Places
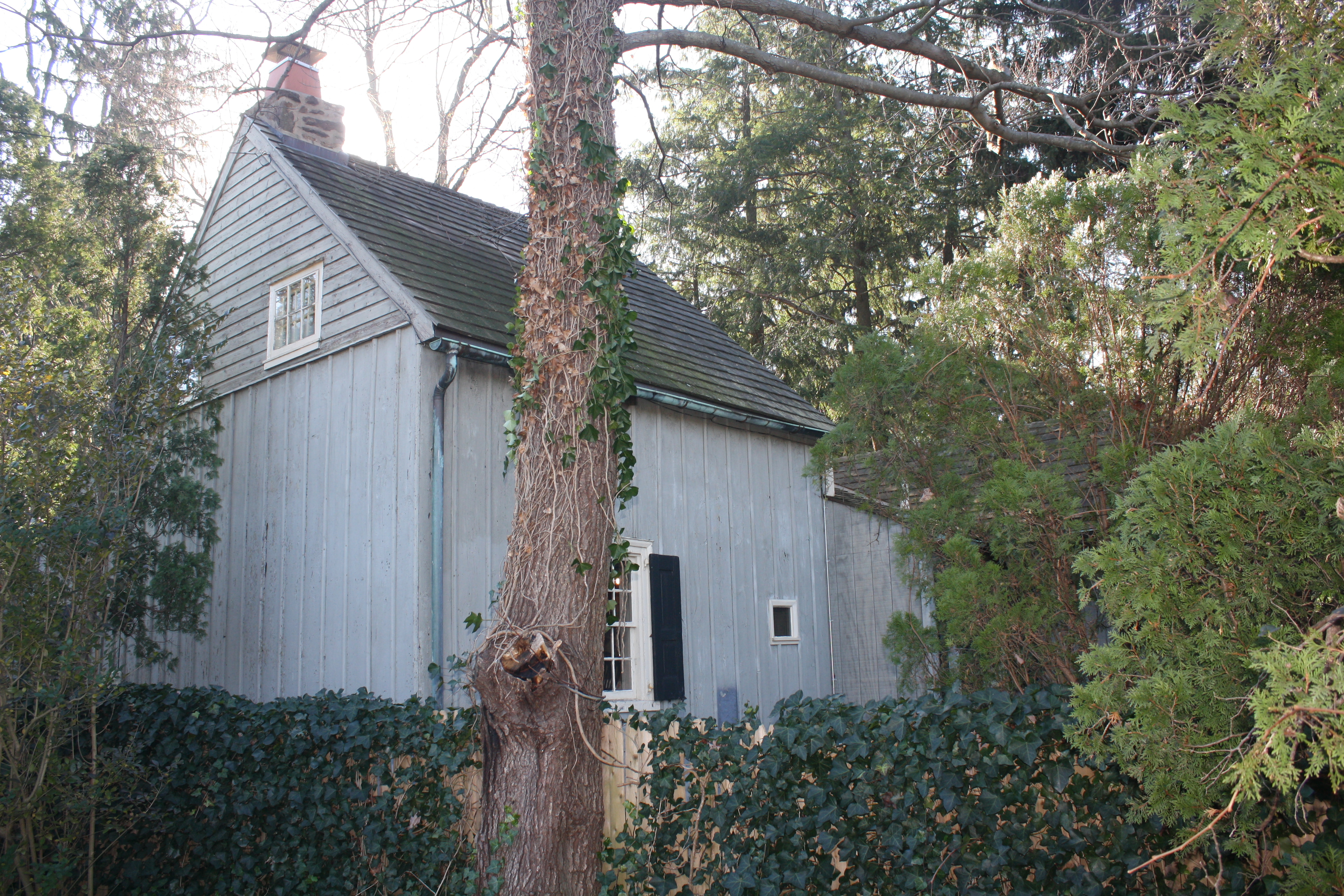
- Jacob Kastner Loghouse, November 2012

- Location within Pennsylvania Location within the United States
- Location: 416 Norristown Rd., Spring House in Lower Gwynedd Township, Pennsylvania
- Coordinates: 40°10′48″N 75°12′50″W
- Area: 1.3 acres (0.53 ha)
- NRHP reference No.: 96000708
- Added to NRHP: July 15, 1996

The Jacob Kastner Loghouse is an historic home that is located in Spring House in Lower Gwynedd Township, Montgomery County, Pennsylvania, United States.

It was added to the National Register of Historic Places in 1996.

== History and architectural features ==
The log house was built roughly between 1712 and 1754, and is a 1 1/2-story, English, single-pen-plan dwelling. It measures approximately fifteen feet wide and sixteen feet, six inches, deep and has a stone cellar. The house is covered with board and batten siding and has a purlin roof. Also located on the property is a contributing well.
