= Gwynedd Valley, Pennsylvania =

Unincorporated community in Pennsylvania, US

- Unincorporated community
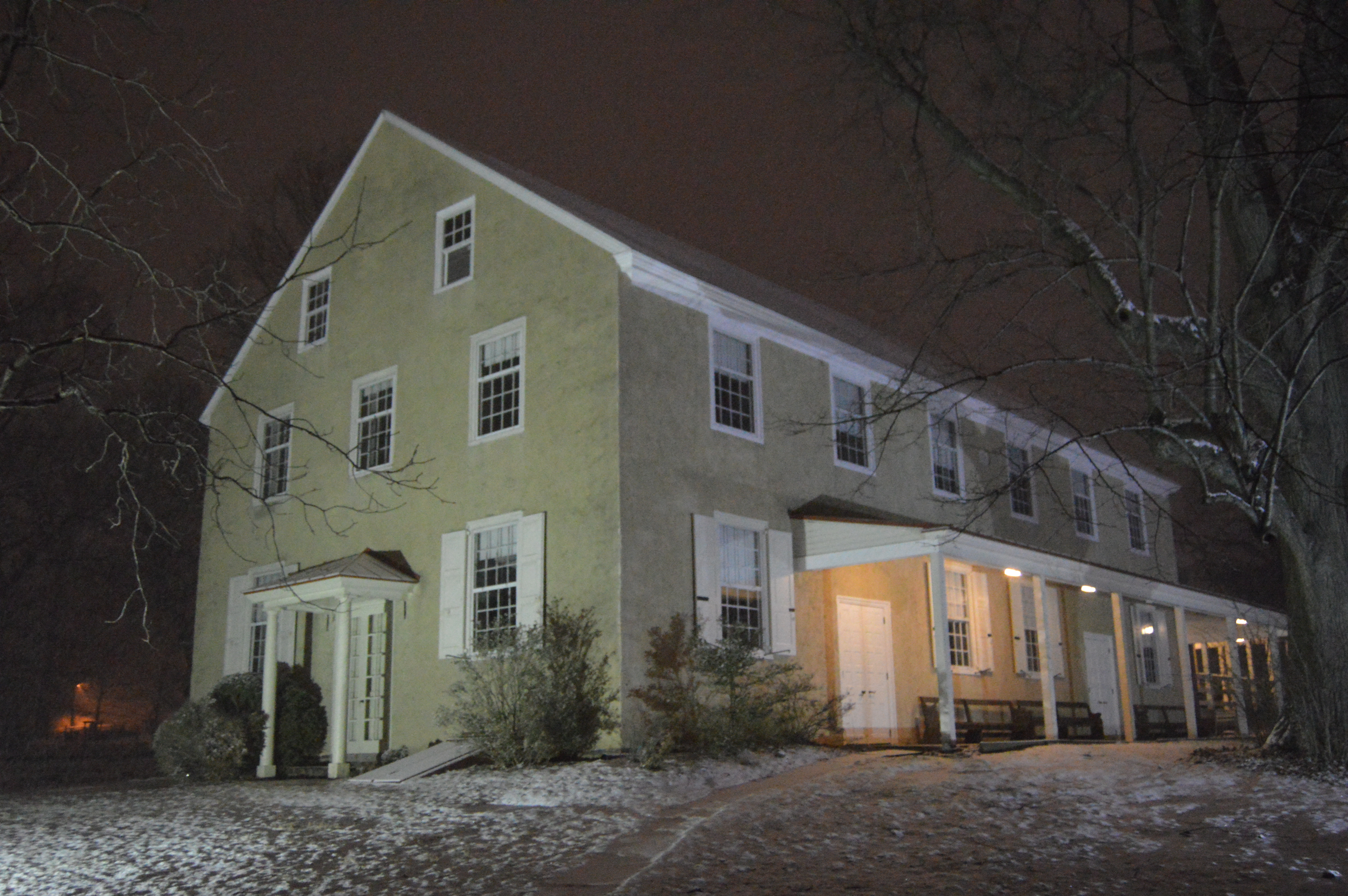

- Location within Pennsylvania
- Coordinates: 40°11′03″N 75°15′23″W
- Country: United States
- State: Pennsylvania
- County: Montgomery
- Township: Lower Gwynedd
- Elevation: 269 ft (82 m)
- Time zone: UTC-5 (Eastern (EST))
  - Summer (DST): UTC-4 (EDT)
- ZIP code: 19437
- Area codes: 215, 267 and 445
- GNIS feature ID: 1203737

Gwynedd Valley is an unincorporated community in Lower Gwynedd Township in Montgomery County, Pennsylvania, United States. Gwynedd Valley is located along Plymouth Road, southwest of the Wissahickon Creek. It is served by the Gwynedd Valley station on SEPTA's Lansdale/Doylestown Line.

== See also ==
- Gwynedd Mercy University
