= Gwynedd Hall =

Historic house in Pennsylvania, United States

- U.S. National Register of Historic Places
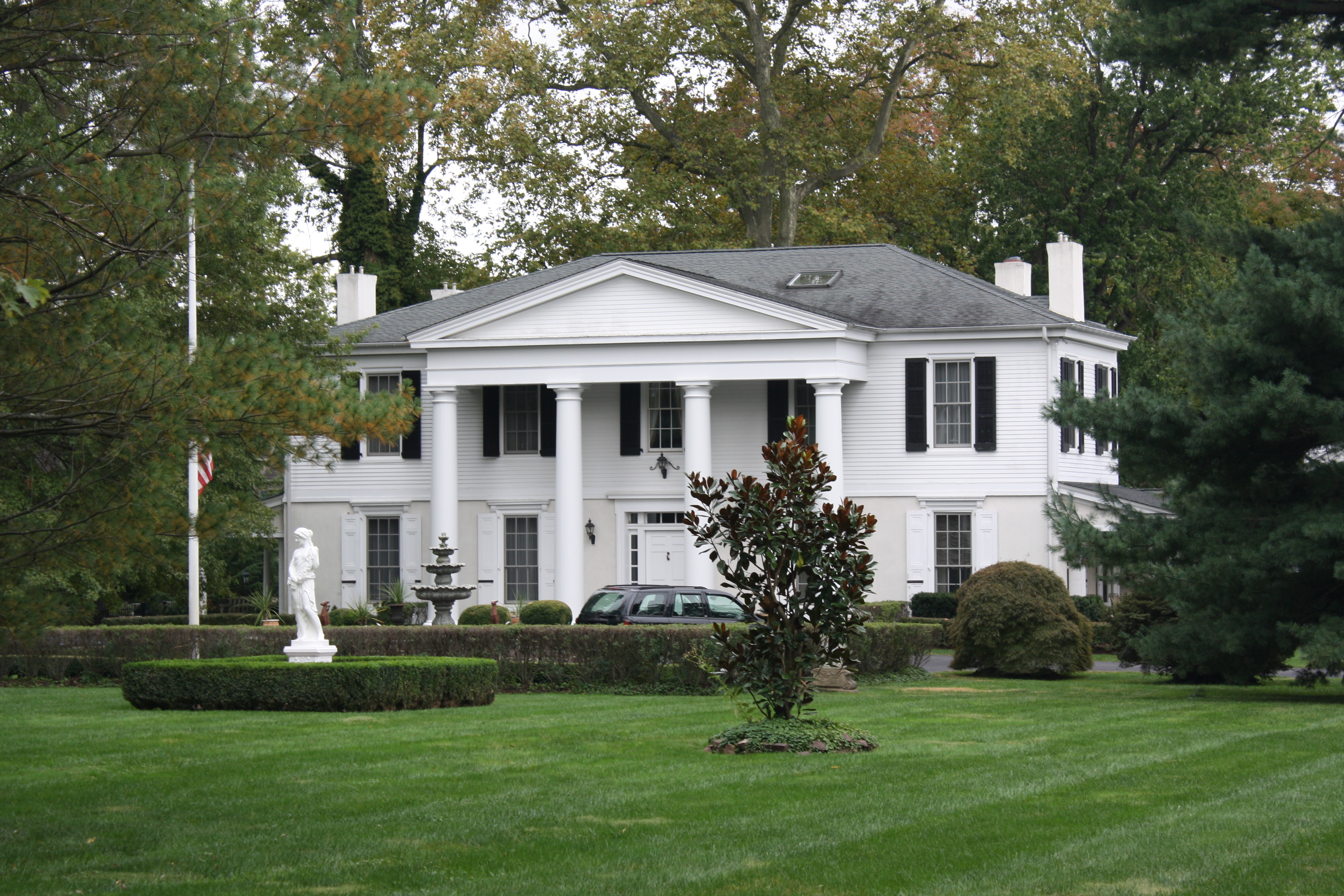
- Gwynedd Hall in September 2012

- Location within Pennsylvania Location within the United States
- Location: Lower Gwynedd Township, Pennsylvania
- Coordinates: 40°12′11″N 75°14′43″W
- Area: 8.5 acres (3.4 ha)
- Built: 1824
- Built by: Cresson, Walter
- Architectural style: Greek Revival
- NRHP reference No.: 85002474
- Added to NRHP: September 24, 1985

Gwynedd Hall is an historic home which is located in Lower Gwynedd Township, Montgomery County, Pennsylvania.

It was added to the National Register of Historic Places in 1985 and was rehabilitated in 1997 when the surrounding property was developed.

== History and architectural features ==
Built in 1824, it was rebuilt into its present configuration in 1852. It is a two- to three-story, stuccoed stone and frame country dwelling, which was designed in the Greek Revival style.

The five-bay symmetrical front facade features a pedimented portico with Tuscan order columns. The house also has open porches, which previously featured decorative wrought iron railings, balustrades, and cornices.
