= Lower Gwynedd Township, Pennsylvania =

Township in Pennsylvania, US

Lower Gwynedd Township
- Township
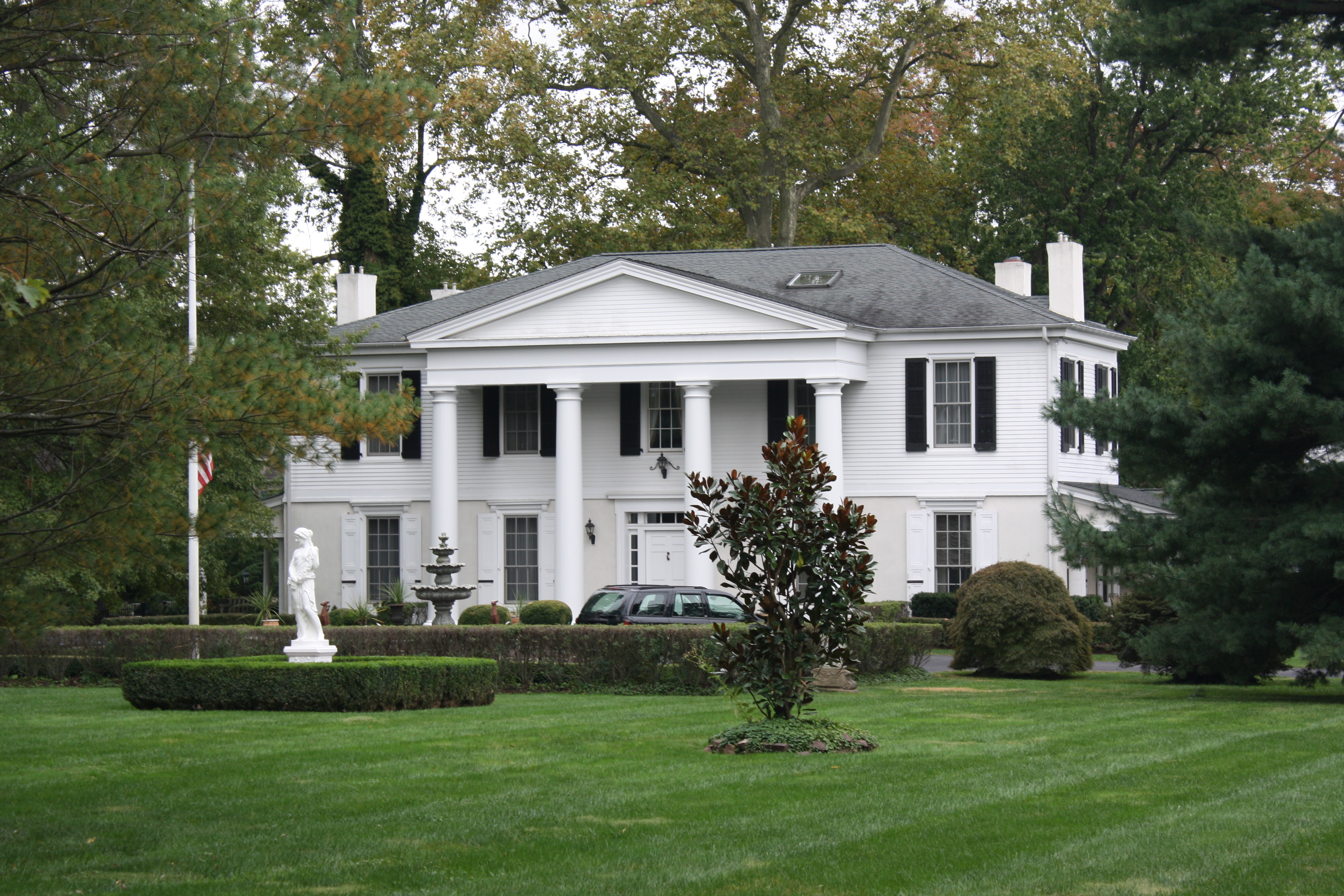
- Gwynedd Hall

- Flag Seal
- Etymology: Gwynedd [ˈɡʊɨnɛð]
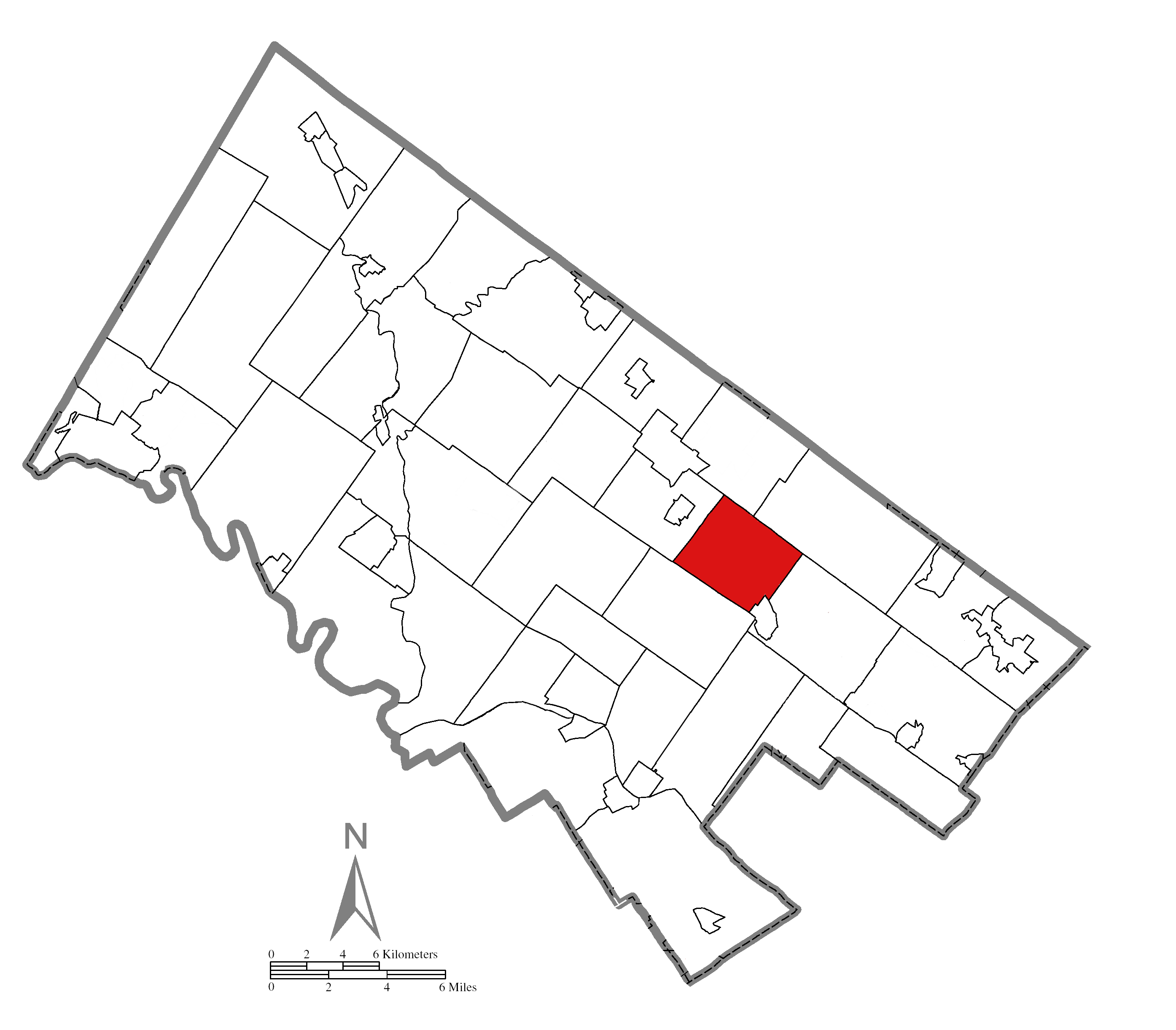
- Location of Lower Gwynedd Township in Montgomery County, Pennsylvania
- Coordinates: 40°12′47″N 75°17′01″W
- Country: United States
- State: Pennsylvania
- County: Montgomery

Area
  - Total: 9.31 sq mi (24.1 km^{2})
  - Land: 9.31 sq mi (24.1 km^{2})
  - Water: 0.01 sq mi (0.026 km^{2})
- Elevation: 348 ft (106 m)

Population (2010)
  - Total: 11,405
  - Estimate (2016): 11,558
  - Density: 1,230/sq mi (473/km^{2})
- Time zone: UTC-5 (EST)
  - Summer (DST): UTC-4 (EDT)
- Area codes: 215, 267, and 445
- FIPS code: 42-091-44920
- Website: lowergwynedd.org

Lower Gwynedd Township ( /ˈɡwɪnɛd/ Welsh pronunciation: [ˈɡwɪnɛð]), founded in 1698, is a township and equestrian community in Montgomery County, Pennsylvania, United States. The population was 11,405 at the 2010 census. The township comprises four villages: Gwynedd, Gwynedd Valley, Penllyn, and Spring House. The township is considered a haven for those seeking a country lifestyle and rural feel, while still offering close proximity to nearby towns as well as Center City Philadelphia and New York City. While its postal address is in Ambler, Pennsylvania (19002), it is adjacent to but technically not a part of the borough of Ambler.

== History ==
Gwynedd was founded in 1698 by Welsh Quakers. The township was then split into Lower Gwynedd and Upper Gwynedd in 1891.

Gwynedd Hall and the Jacob Kastner Loghouse are listed on the National Register of Historic Places.

== Geography ==
According to the United States Census Bureau, the township has a total area of 9.4 square miles (24.2 km^{2}), of which 9.3 square miles (24.2 km^{2}) is land and 0.11% is water.

The township has twenty miles of trails and 120 acres of parkland.

== Transportation ==
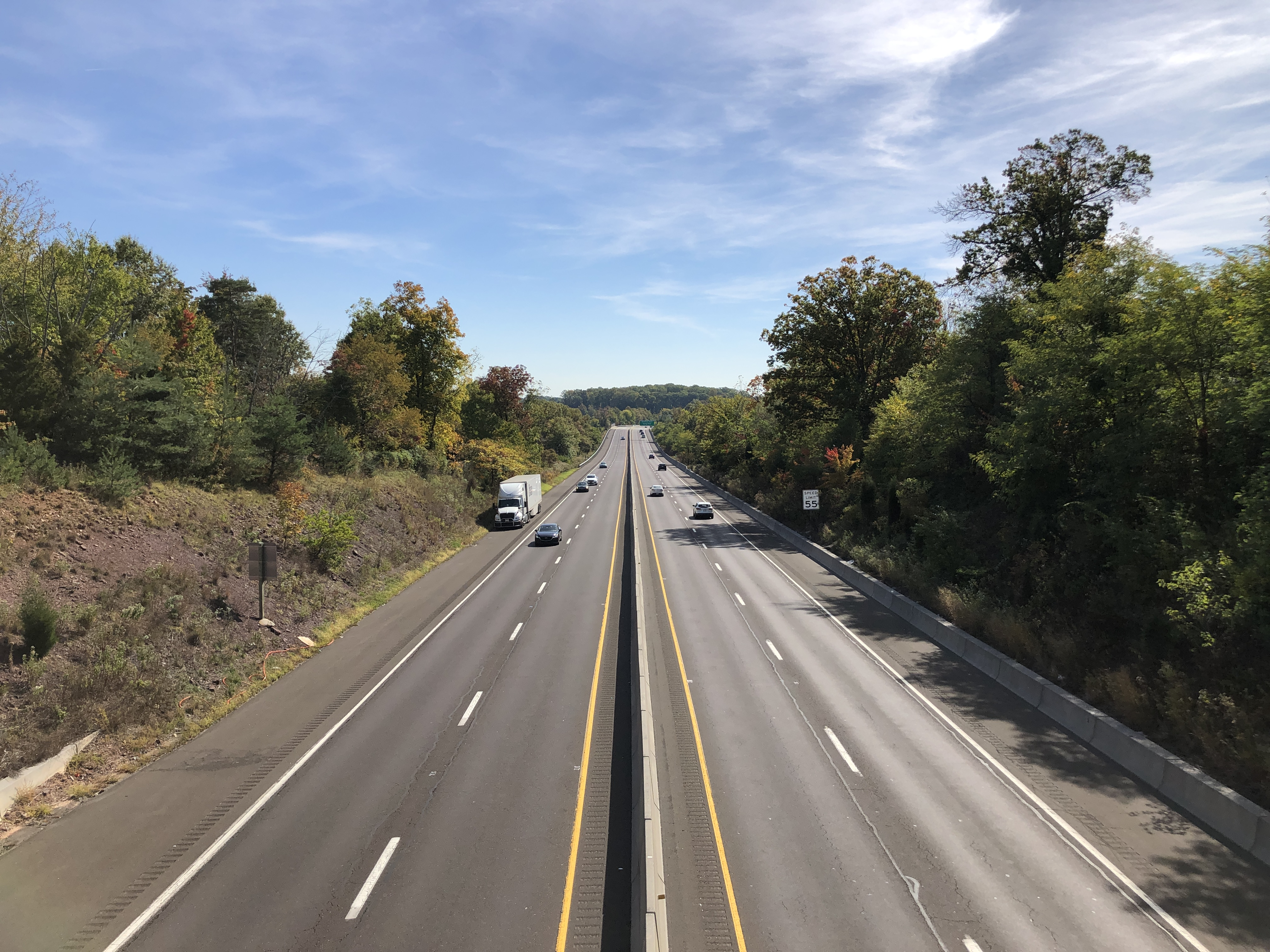
PA 309 southbound in Lower Gwynedd Township

As of 2018, there were 64.43 miles (103.69 km) of public roads in Lower Gwynedd Township, of which 16.85 miles (27.12 km) were maintained by the Pennsylvania Department of Transportation (PennDOT) and 47.58 miles (76.57 km) were maintained by the township.

Several numbered highways traverse Lower Gwynedd Township. U.S. Route 202 follows Dekalb Pike on a northeast-southwest alignment across the northwestern portion of the township. Pennsylvania Route 63 follows Welsh Road along the northeastern border of the township. Finally, Pennsylvania Route 309 follows the Fort Washington Expressway northwestward across the eastern portion of the township to its terminus, then joins the Bethlehem Pike before exiting the township to the north.

SEPTA Regional Rail's Lansdale/Doylestown Line runs through Lower Gwynedd Township, with stations at Gwynedd Valley and Penllyn. SEPTA provides Suburban Bus service to Lower Gwynedd Township along Route 94, which runs between the Chestnut Hill section of Philadelphia and the Montgomery Mall, and Route 96, which runs between the Norristown Transportation Center in Norristown and Lansdale.

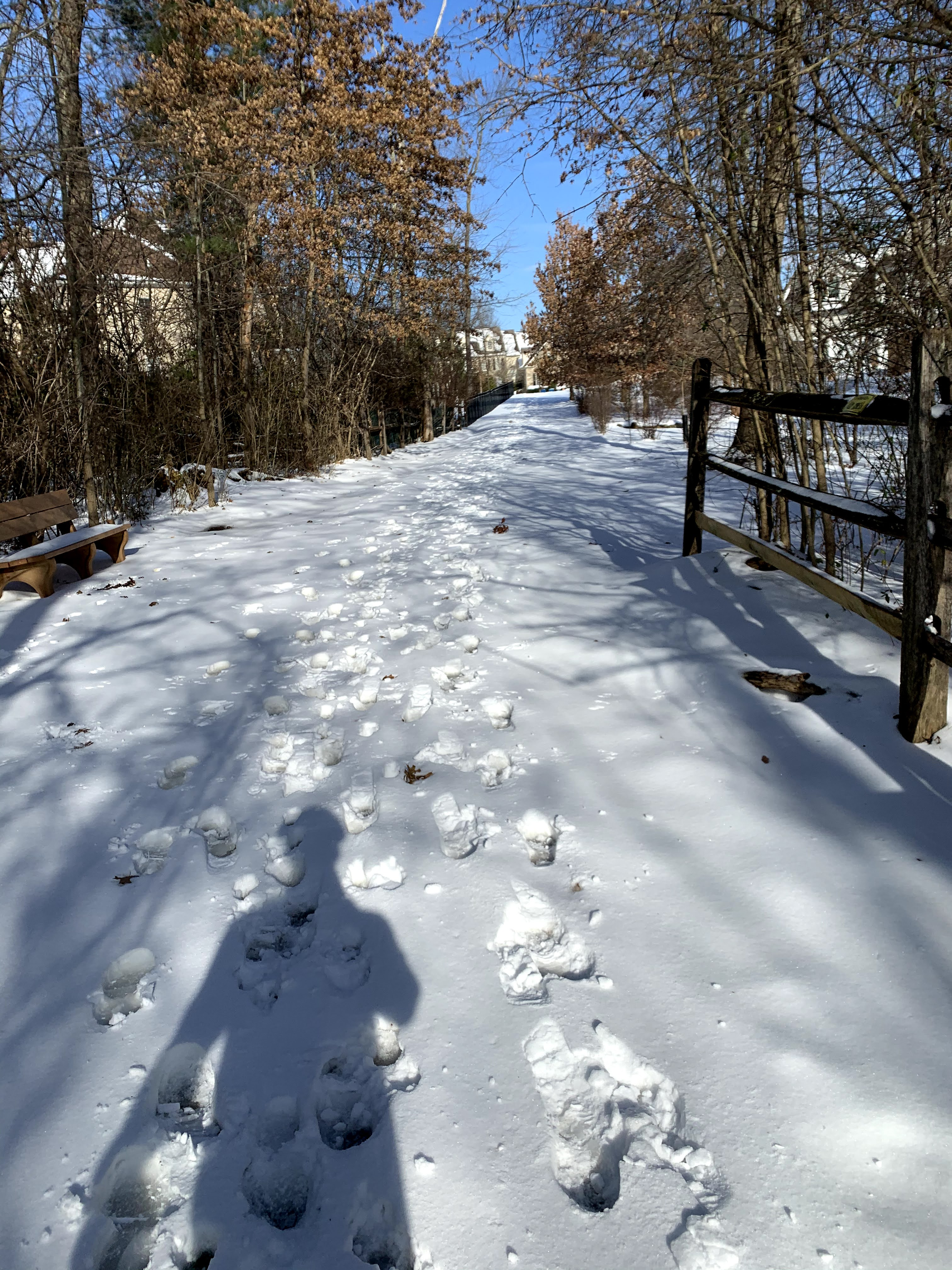
A trail in Lower Gwynedd Township

== Demographics ==
Historical population
Census	Pop.	Note	%±
1930	1,847		—
1940	1,992		7.9%
1950	2,475		24.2%
1960	4,546		83.7%
1970	6,361		39.9%
1980	6,902		8.5%
1990	9,958		44.3%
2000	10,422		4.7%
2010	11,405		9.4%
2020	12,076		5.9%

As of the 2010 census, the township was 84.0% White, 6.9% Black or African American, 0.1% Native American, 7.1% Asian, and 1.5% were two or more races. 1.9% of the population were of Hispanic or Latino ancestry.

As of the census of 2000, there were 10,422 people, 4,177 households, and 2,752 families residing in the township. The population density was 1,115.9 inhabitants per square mile (430.9/km^{2}). There were 4,360 housing units at an average density of 466.8 per square mile (180.2/km^{2}). The racial makeup of the township was 86.80% White, 7.78% African American, 4.10% Asian, 1.05% Hispanic or Latino, 0.98% from two or more races, 0.26% from other races, 0.08% Native American, and 0.01% Pacific Islander.

There were 4,177 households, out of which 29.2% had children under the age of 18 living with them, 58.6% were married couples living together, 5.6% had a female householder with no husband present, and 34.1% were non-families. 31.6% of all households were made up of individuals, and 19.7% had someone living alone who was 65 years of age or older. The average household size was 2.39 and the average family size was 3.03.

In the township the population was spread out, with 23.1% under the age of 18, 5.7% from 18 to 24, 22.0% from 25 to 44, 26.6% from 45 to 64, and 22.6% who were 65 years of age or older. The median age was 45 years. For every 100 females there were 81.7 males. For every 100 females age 18 and over, there were 77.4 males.

The median income for a household in the township was $74,351, and the median income for a family was $97,991. Males had a median income of $71,027 versus $44,541 for females. The per capita income for the township was $41,868. About 1.2% of families and 2.7% of the population were below the poverty line, including 3.1% of those under age 18 and 3.0% of those age 65 or over.

== Government and politics ==
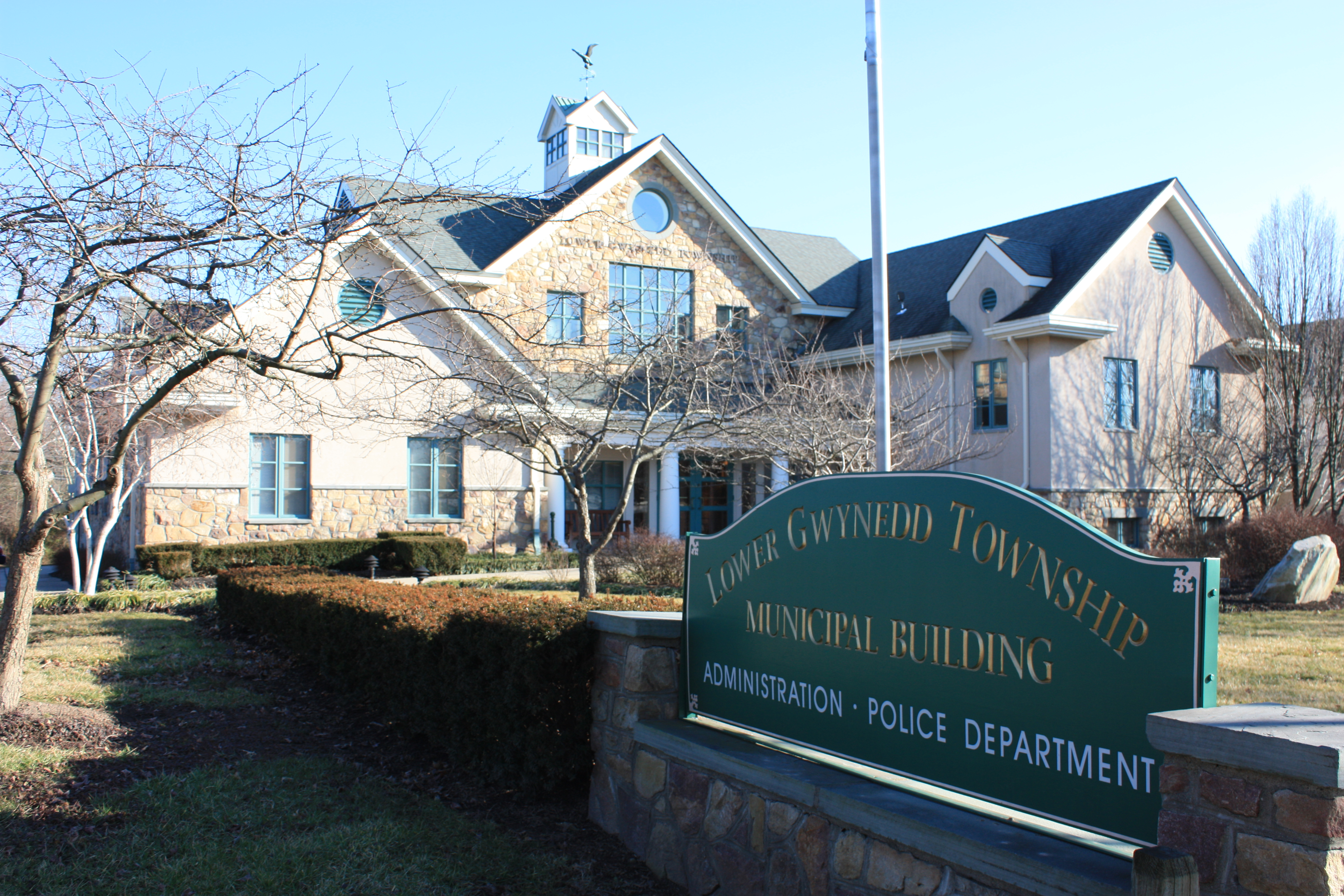
Lower Gwynedd Township Building

Presidential elections results
Year	Republican	Democratic
2020	34.7% 2,952	63.9% 5,434
2016	37.4% 2,766	58.8% 4,343
2012	49.4% 3,572	49.9% 3,603
2008	44.8% 3,312	54.7% 4,037
2004	49.6% 3,557	50.0% 3,589
2000	52.4% 3,134	45.6% 2,726
1996	51.9% 2,725	40.6% 2,132
1992	51.2% 2,031	34.0% 1,348

Danielle Duckett currently fills the position of the chair of the Board of Supervisors of Lower Gwynedd Township.

== Education ==
It is in the Wissahickon School District. Wissahickon High School is the district's comprehensive high school.

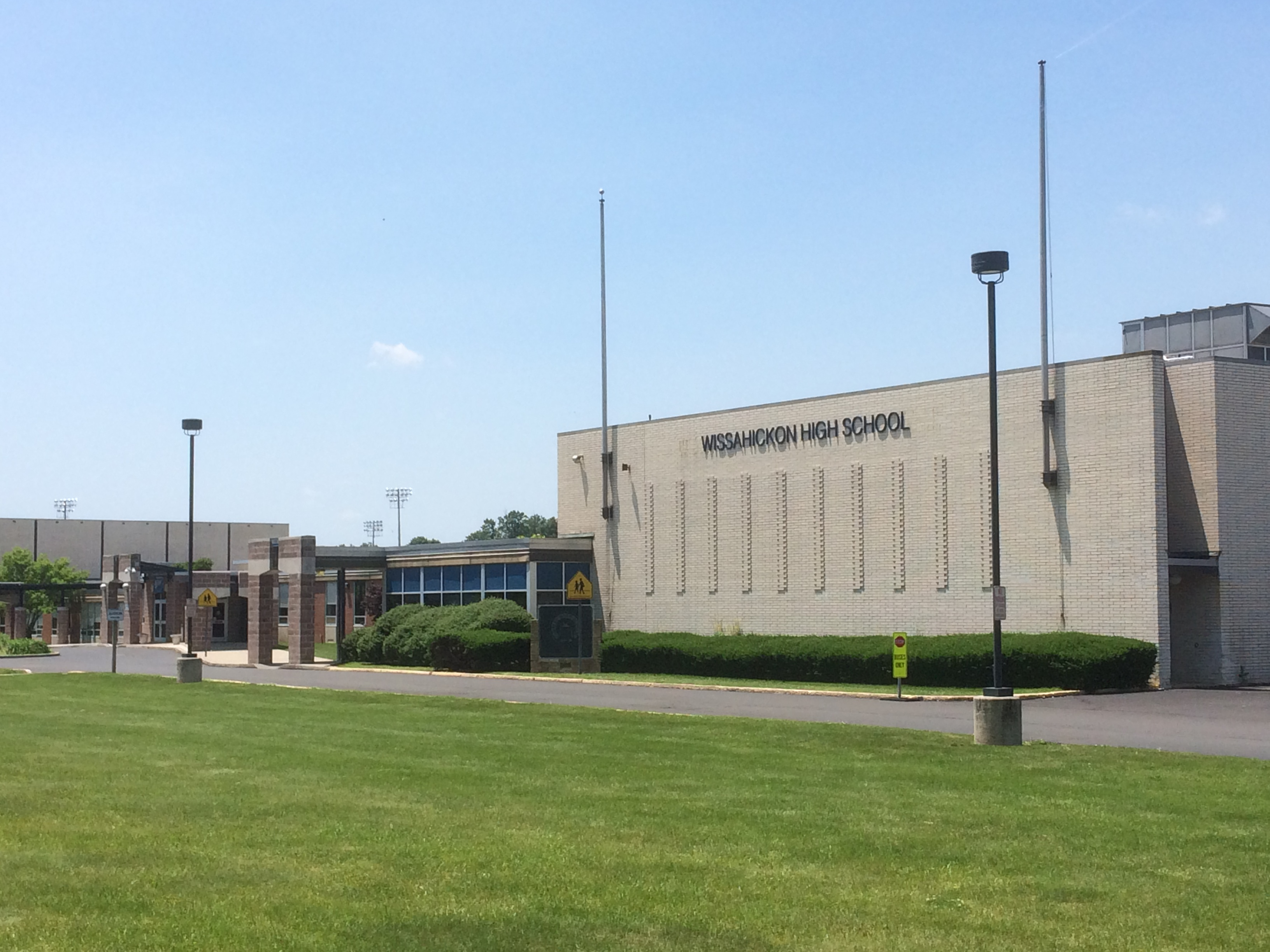
Wissahickon High School
