= E-Dubble =

American rapper (1982–2017)

Background information
- Born: Evan Sewell Wallace; November 1, 1982; Philadelphia, Pennsylvania, U.S.
- Died: February 13, 2017 (aged 34) Philadelphia, Pennsylvania, U.S.
- Genre: Hip hop
- Occupations: Singer, songwriter, rapper
- Years active: 1998–2017
- Label: Black Paisley Records
- Website: blackpaisleyrecords.com

Evan Sewell Wallace (November 1, 1982 – February 13, 2017) best known by his stage name E-Dubble, often stylized e-dubble, or shortened to e-dub, was an American rapper. He was best known for his Freestyle Friday series in which he released a new song each Friday throughout 2010, with one final unofficial release in 2012. He was the founder of Black Paisley Records. He stood for change and equilibrium, positively inspiring those that saw him for who he was and his messages.

Throughout his career, E-Dubble released two studio albums, Hip Hop Is Good (2009), and Two Tone Rebel (2016); One studio EP Reset EP (2012); one collaborative EP with the band 27 Lights, Surrounded By Giants (2014); and two mixtapes Straight Outta St. Mary's (2006) and Written Thursday (2011).

== Background ==
Wallace grew up outside of Philadelphia, the youngest child of two educators. Growing up, Wallace was a fan of Snoop Dogg, Dr. Dre and many others. He started rapping from the age of 8 but did not gain mainstream success until later due to him being insecure about his rapping ability. His music would later be known for its common celebrations of his love for hip-hop. He played center on the Wissahickon High School basketball team but dreamed of being a professional rapper. In an interview with the Baltimore magazine, Wallace cited Eminem's breakout success in the late 90s as a major inspiration to him.

During his time in St. Mary's College of Maryland, Wallace and a fellow student called Skeltz joined a group called Irishtoothache composed mainly of students from the University of Maryland, he made his first song with them in 2003, he continued making collaborative songs with them up until 2010.

Wallace graduated from St. Mary's College of Maryland with a degree in political science. The Straight Outta St. Mary's mixtape was released on April 12, 2006, and was written by E-Dubble and Glaze who were both members of Irishtoothache.

E-dubble moved to Baltimore to live with his friends and collaborators. Together they formed the hip-hop band Young English and played their first show in July 2008. The group went on to purchase a renovated warehouse, dubbed "The Hampden Mansion," where E-dubble would later go on to write, record, and produce his debut album Hip-Hop is Good, released on October 27, 2009. The next year, in August 2010, E-dubble created his YouTube channel. He went on to produce his Freestyle Friday series, a weekly series of free songs.

The first Freestyle Friday track—not true freestyle raps, but composed songs—was released on February 5, 2010, with a new song released every Friday until February 3, 2011. He also occasionally collaborated with his band Young English, to make some of his tracks. A final track, "Last Man Standing", was released in 2012. The series was noted for its effective use of samples, lyrics and E-dubble's spoken word outros, in which he communicated with listeners. The pressure of writing and recording a new song every week took its toll.

Reset EP was released on November 6, 2012, was well received by his fans and it focused on his recovery following the Freestyle Friday era He released a single, entitled "What it Do", in October 2015, in which he looked back at his past, his love of hip-hop, and reflected on his misuse of prescription medication. The video was shot at the Philadelphia Folk Festival, a place of significance and tradition to Wallace and his family. One of the videographers who worked on the video would later say that the rapper was not in the best mental state when filming, but that Wallace "turning what troubles him into light" was one of his most characteristic traits. E-dubble released his final album, Two Tone Rebel, in 2016.

== Death ==
Wallace died on February 13, 2017, after being hospitalized for several weeks due to an unspecified illness. He was 34 years old. Sepsis was reported as the cause of death, but this was not confirmed. Wallace claimed that his illness caused him to "throw up half of his body's blood" and for "his hands to swell up." He also said that he had to have "10 blood transfusions."

== Discography ==
Studio albums

- Hip-Hop is Good (2009)
- Two Tone Rebel (2016)

Extended Plays

- Reset (2012)
- Surrounded By Giants (with 27 Lights) (2014)

Mixtapes

- Straight Outta St. Mary's (2006)
- Written Thursday (2011)
