= Penllyn station (SEPTA) =

Railway station in Penllyn, Pennsylvania

Penllyn
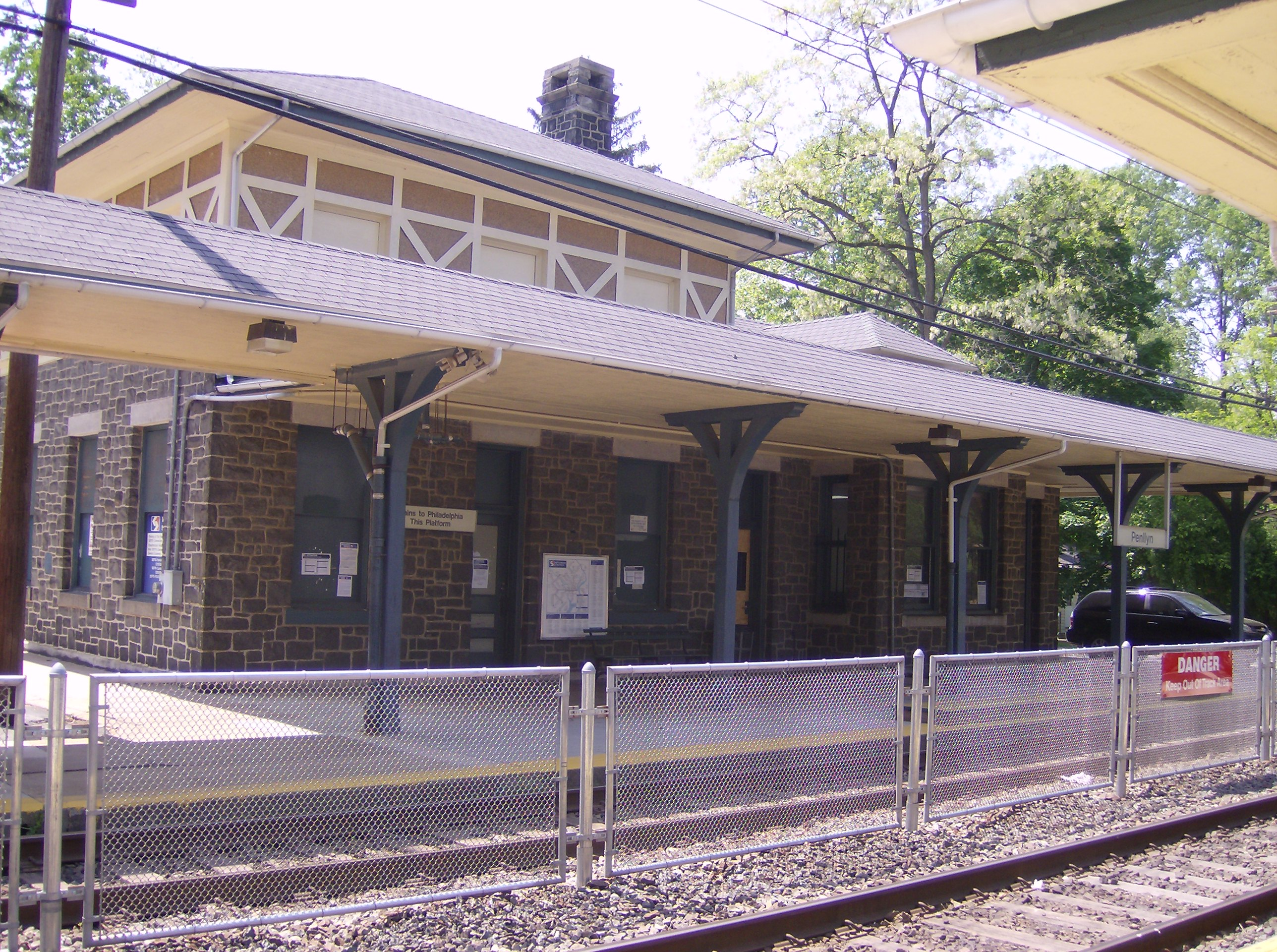

General information
- Location: Old Penllyn Pike & Pen-Ambler Road; Penllyn, Pennsylvania
- Coordinates: 40.1697°N 75.2441°W
- Owner: SEPTA
- Line: SEPTA Main Line
- Platforms: 2 side platforms
- Tracks: 2
- Connections: SEPTA Suburban Bus: 94

Construction
- Platform levels: 1
- Parking: 55 spaces
- Accessible: No

Other information
- Fare zone: 3

History
- Opened: 1930
- Electrified: July 26, 1931

Services
Preceding station	SEPTA	Following station
Ambler toward Penn Medicine Station	Lansdale/Doylestown Line	Gwynedd Valley toward Doylestown
Former services
Preceding station	Reading Railroad	Following station
Ambler toward Philadelphia	Bethlehem Branch	Gwynedd Valley toward Bethlehem
Location

Penllyn station is a station situated in the village of Penllyn, Lower Gwynedd Township, Montgomery County, Pennsylvania, United States. It is served by the SEPTA Lansdale/Doylestown Line. The station, located at the intersection of Old Penllyn Pike and Pen-Ambler Road, includes a 55-space parking lot and also provides a connection to SEPTA Bus Route 94.

Penllyn station was built in 1930 by the Reading Railroad. In the mid-1990s, the building served as the headquarters of fast-growing online music retailer CDNow. In FY 2013, the station had a weekday average of 216 boardings and 182 alightings.

== Station layout ==
Penllyn has two low-level side platforms.
