= Gwynedd Valley station =

Railway station in Gwynedd Valley, Pennsylvania

Gwynedd Valley
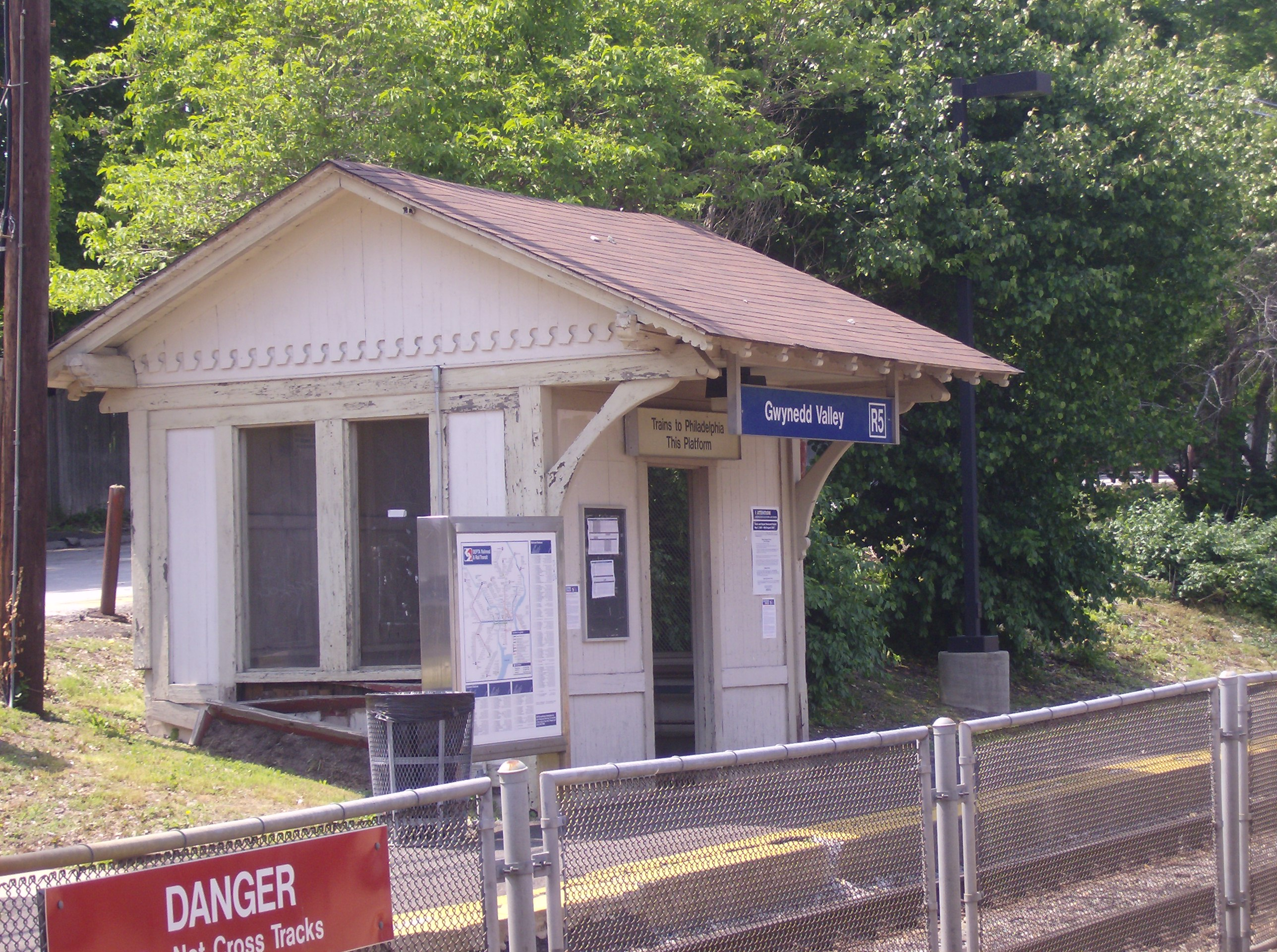
- Gwynedd Valley station's matching shelter

General information
- Location: 521 Plymouth Road; Gwynedd Valley, Pennsylvania
- Coordinates: 40.1849°N 75.2568°W
- Owner: SEPTA
- Line: SEPTA Main Line
- Platforms: 2 side platforms
- Tracks: 2

Construction
- Platform levels: 1
- Parking: 118 spaces
- Cycle facilities: Yes
- Accessible: No

Other information
- Fare zone: 3

History
- Opened: 1888
- Electrified: July 26, 1931

Services
Preceding station	SEPTA	Following station
Penllyn toward Penn Medicine Station	Lansdale/Doylestown Line	North Wales toward Doylestown
Former services
Preceding station	Reading Railroad	Following station
Penllyn toward Philadelphia	Bethlehem Branch	North Wales toward Bethlehem
Location

The Gwynedd Valley station is a transit station which is located on the SEPTA Lansdale/Doylestown Line. The station, which is situated at the grade crossing of Plymouth Road in Gwynedd Valley (part of Lower Gwynedd Township, Pennsylvania), includes a 166-space parking lot.

In FY 2013, Gwynedd Valley station had a weekday average of 210 boardings and 237 alightings.

== Notes ==
The train station was featured on the cover of the October 7, 1961 edition of the Saturday Evening Post. The cover was painted by Whitpain Township resident John Falter.

== Station layout ==
Gwynedd Valley has two low-level side platforms.

== Gallery ==
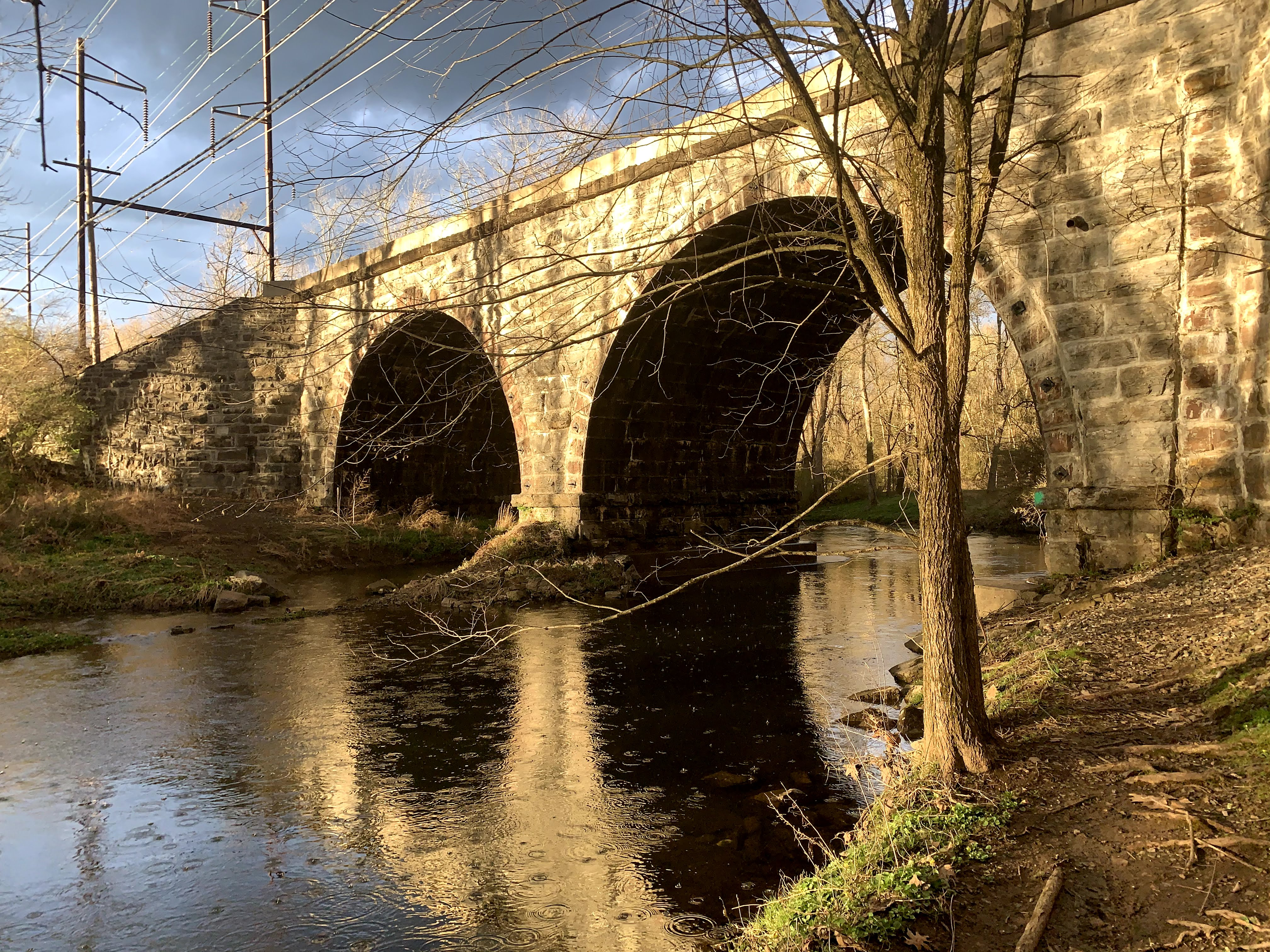
Railroad Bridge over Green Ribbon Trail near Gwynedd Valley station
