= Tanoh Kpassagnon =

American football player (born 1994)

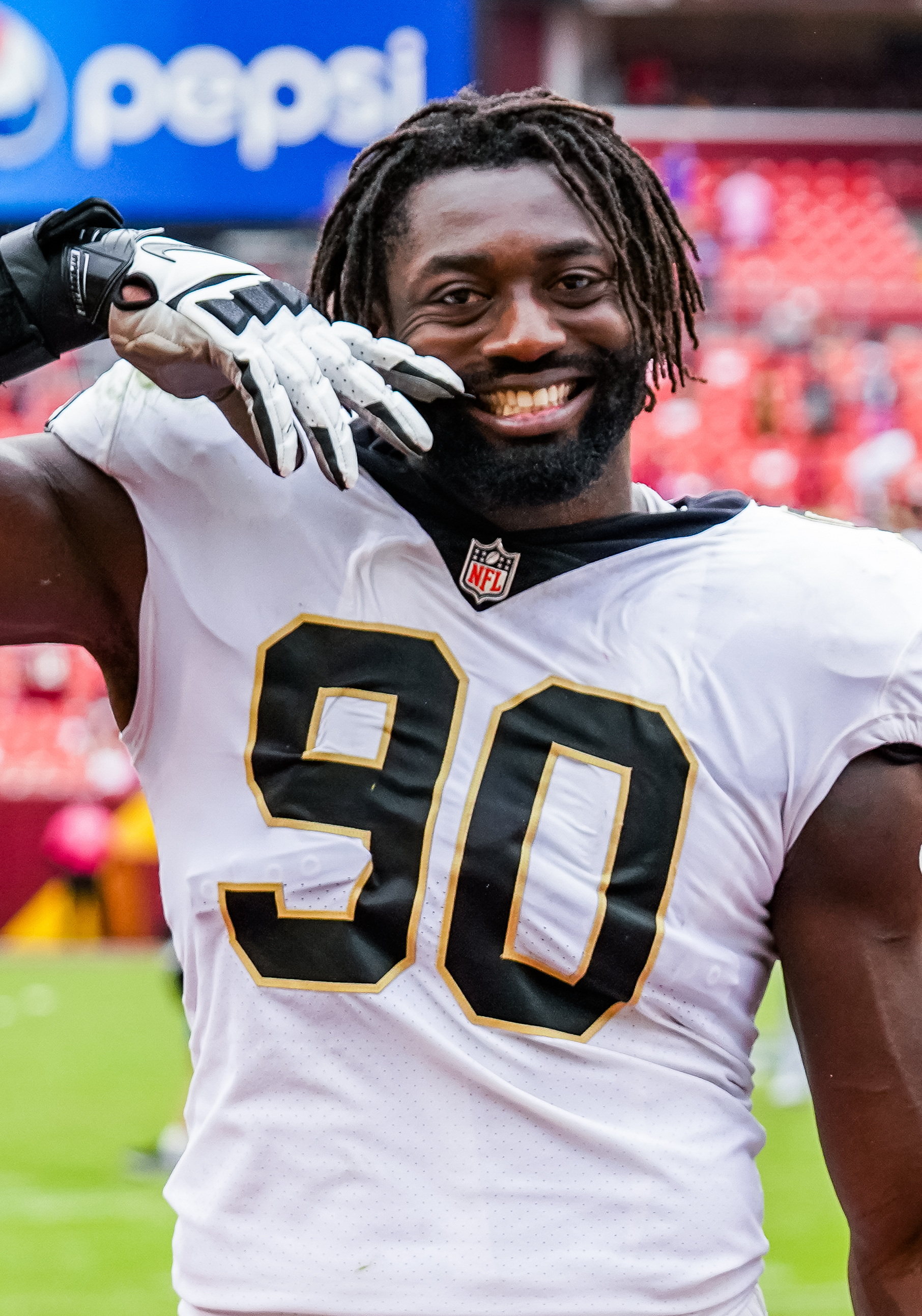
- Kpassagnon with the New Orleans Saints in 2021

No. 58 – Tennessee Titans
- Position: Defensive end
- Roster status: Injured reserve

Personal information
- Born: June 14, 1994 (age 32); Kalamazoo, Michigan, U.S.
- Listed height: 6 ft 7 in (2.01 m)
- Listed weight: 289 lb (131 kg)

Career information
- High school: Wissahickon (Ambler, Pennsylvania)
- College: Villanova (2012–2016)
- NFL draft: 2017: 2nd round, 59th overall pick

Career history
- Kansas City Chiefs (2017–2020); New Orleans Saints (2021–2024); Chicago Bears (2025); Indianapolis Colts (2025); Tennessee Titans (2026–present)

Awards and highlights
- Super Bowl champion (LIV); 2× First-team All-CAA (2015, 2016); CAA Defensive Player of the Year (2016)

Career NFL statistics as of 2025
- Total tackles: 146
- Sacks: 17.5
- Forced fumbles: 2
- Fumble recoveries: 1
- Pass deflections: 9
- Stats at Pro Football Reference

Tanoh Kpassagnon (/ˈtɑːnoʊ ˈpæsənjoʊ/ TAH-noh PASS-ən-yoh; born June 14, 1994) is an American professional football defensive end for the Tennessee Titans of the National Football League (NFL). He played college football for the Villanova Wildcats and was selected by the Kansas City Chiefs in the second round of the 2017 NFL draft.

== Early life ==
Kpassagnon attended and played high school football at Wissahickon High School in Ambler, Pennsylvania.

== College career ==
Kpassagnon committed to play at Villanova University, the only school to offer him a scholarship for football. He redshirted his freshman season and started as a tight end. By his junior season, he had switched to defensive end. As a senior, he was the Colonial Athletic Association defensive player of the year after recording 11 sacks. In a game against Pittsburgh, Kpassagnon blocked a field goal and had two tackles for loss.

Kpassagnon double-majored in accounting and finance at Villanova. He interned at the accounting firm PricewaterhouseCoopers for two summers. He was later admitted to Master of Business Administration at Kelley School of Business, Indiana University Bloomington.

== Professional career ==
=== Pre-draft ===
Kpassagnon received an invitation to the Senior Bowl and made two combined tackles and a sack, helping the South clinch a 16–15 defeat over the North. He attended the NFL Combine and completed all of the combine and positional drills. He also participated at Villanova's Pro Day and ran positional drills for scouts and representatives. Representatives from 18 NFL teams, including six defensive line coaches, attended to scout Kpassagnon as the feature prospect, two Villanova teammates, and seven other players from smaller schools. Kpassagnon had private workouts and visits with ten NFL teams, that included the Dallas Cowboys, Detroit Lions, Carolina Panthers, Cincinnati Bengals, Atlanta Falcons, New England Patriots, Baltimore Ravens, Washington Redskins, New Orleans Saints, and Pittsburgh Steelers. NFL draft experts and analysts projected him to be drafted anywhere from the second to fourth round. He was ranked the 12th best defensive end in the draft by NFLDraftScout.com and the 13th best defensive end by ESPN.

Pre-draft measurables
Height	Weight	Arm length	Hand span	Wingspan	40-yard dash	10-yard split	20-yard split	20-yard shuttle	Three-cone drill	Vertical jump	Broad jump	Bench press
6 ft 6 3/4 in (2.00 m)	289 lb (131 kg)	35 5/8 in (0.90 m)	10 5/8 in (0.27 m)	7 ft 0 3/8 in (2.14 m)	4.83 s	1.69 s	2.81 s	4.62 s	7.46 s	30.0 in (0.76 m)	10 ft 8 in (3.25 m)	23 reps
All values from NFL Combine

=== Kansas City Chiefs ===
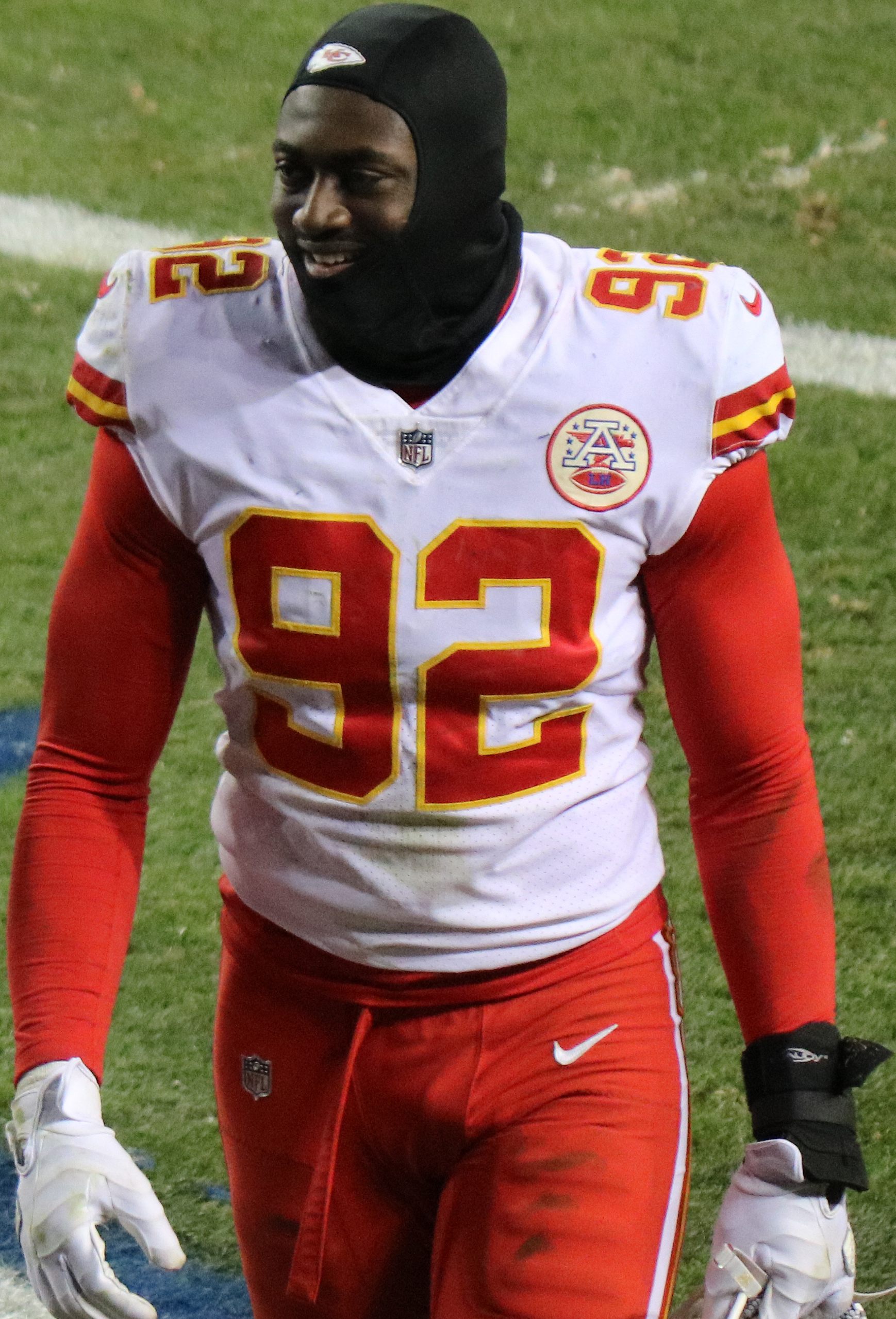
Kpassagnon with the Kansas City Chiefs in 2017.

The Kansas City Chiefs selected Kpassagnon in the second round with the 59th overall pick in the 2017 NFL draft. He was the seventh defensive end selected in the 2017 NFL Draft. On June 7, 2017, the Kansas City Chiefs signed Kpassagnon to a four-year, $4.32 million contract with $1.94 million guaranteed and a signing bonus of $1.32 million.

He competed with Rakeem Nuñez-Roches, Jarvis Jenkins, Allen Bailey, and David King throughout training camp for the vacant starting defensive end job left by the departure of Jaye Howard. After showing versatility and "freakish" athleticism throughout training camp and the preseason, head coach Andy Reid designated an edge rusher role for Kpassagnon that allows him to line up at multiple positions, including outside linebacker, defensive end, and defensive tackle. Kpassagnon was named the backup right outside linebacker behind Dee Ford with the usual starter, Tamba Hali, on the physically unable to perform list to begin the regular season.

Kpassagnon made his professional regular season debut during the Chiefs' season-opening 42–27 victory over the Patriots. On December 31, 2017, with the division title and the fourth seed clinched, Chiefs head coach Andy Reid rested the majority of the teams starters, giving Kpassagnon the chance to make his first career start against the Denver Broncos. He finished with seven combined tackles and two sacks during the 27–24 victory.

On January 19, 2020, against the Tennessee Titans in the AFC Championship Game, Kpassagnon sacked quarterback Ryan Tannehill twice during the 35–24 win. The Chiefs eventually made it to Super Bowl LIV. The Chiefs succeeded in defeating the 49ers 31–20 to secure their first championship in 50 years.

In Week 16 of the 2020 season against the Falcons, Kpassagnon tipped a potential game-tying field goal attempt by Younghoe Koo to seal a 17–14 win for the Chiefs. Overall, he finished the 2020 season with 28 total tackles, one sack, and three passes defensed. In the AFC Championship against the Buffalo Bills, Kpassagnon recorded one sack on Josh Allen during the 38–24 win.

=== New Orleans Saints ===
Kpassagnon signed a two-year contract with the Saints on March 29, 2021. He was placed on injured reserve on December 2.

On February 27, 2023, Kpassagnon signed a two-year contract extension with the Saints. In Week 15 against Tommy DeVito and the New York Giants, Kpassagnon recorded a career–high three sacks.

On May 28, 2024, it was announced that Kpassagnon had suffered a torn Achilles tendon in the offseason and would miss training camp as a result. On August 27, Kpassagnon was placed on the reserve/Physically Unable to Perform (PUP) list to begin the season. He was activated on December 14.

=== Chicago Bears ===
On July 22, 2025, Kpassagnon signed with the Chicago Bears. He was released on August 26 as part of final roster cuts and re-signed to the practice squad the next day. For Week 1 against the Minnesota Vikings on Monday Night Football, he was elevated off the practice squad. At the start of the second half, Tanoh sacked J. J. McCarthy. He was signed to the active roster on September 20. He was released on October 17 and re-signed to the practice squad. Kpassagnon was released again on October 21.

=== Indianapolis Colts ===
On October 27, 2025, the Indianapolis Colts signed Kpassagnon to their practice squad. He was released by Indianapolis on November 18.

=== Tennessee Titans ===
On August 21, 2026, the Tennessee Titans signed Kpassagnon. On August 30, Kpassagnon was placed on season–ending injured reserve.

== Personal life ==
Kpassagnon is the son of Ivorian and Ugandan parents. His mother, Winifred Wafwoyo, is a chemist, and his father, Patrice Kpassagnon Tagro, is an economist.
