= Spring House, Pennsylvania =

Unincorporated community in Pennsylvania, US

Spring House
- Census-designated place
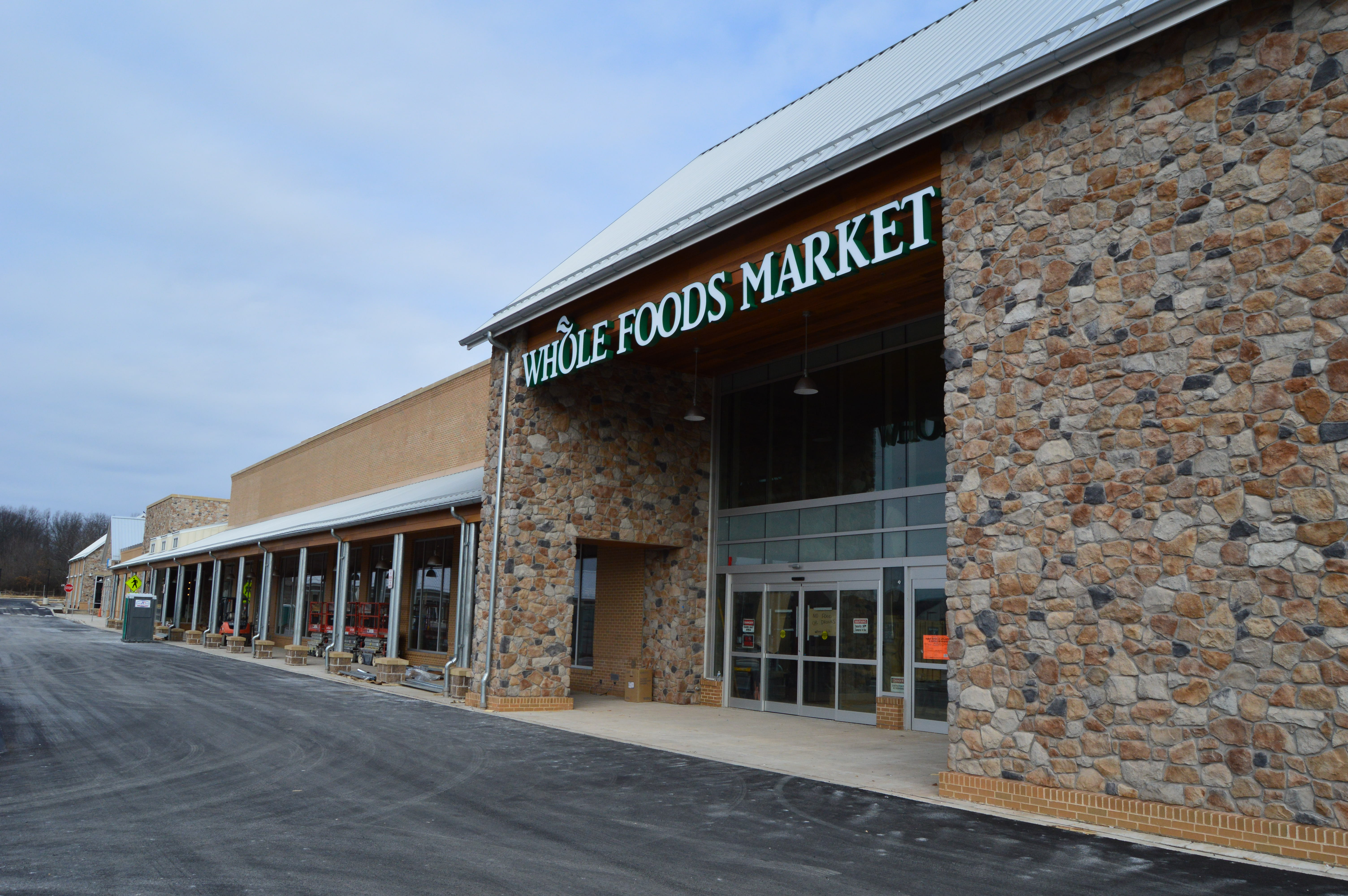
- Whole Foods Market in Spring House

- Location of Spring House in Pennsylvania
- Coordinates: 40°10′59″N 75°13′52″W
- Country: United States
- State: Pennsylvania
- County: Montgomery
- Township: Lower Gwynedd

Area
  - Total: 2.6 sq mi (6.7 km^{2})
  - Land: 2.6 sq mi (6.7 km^{2})
  - Water: 0.0 sq mi (0 km^{2})
- Elevation: 285 ft (87 m)

Population (2020)
  - Total: 3,978
  - Density: 1,500/sq mi (590/km^{2})
- Time zone: UTC-5 (EST)
  - Summer (DST): UTC-4 (EDT)
- ZIP codes: 19436, 19477
- Area codes: 215, 267, and 445

Spring House is a census-designated place (CDP) in Lower Gwynedd Township, Pennsylvania, United States. The population was 3,978 at the 2020 census.

== Geography ==
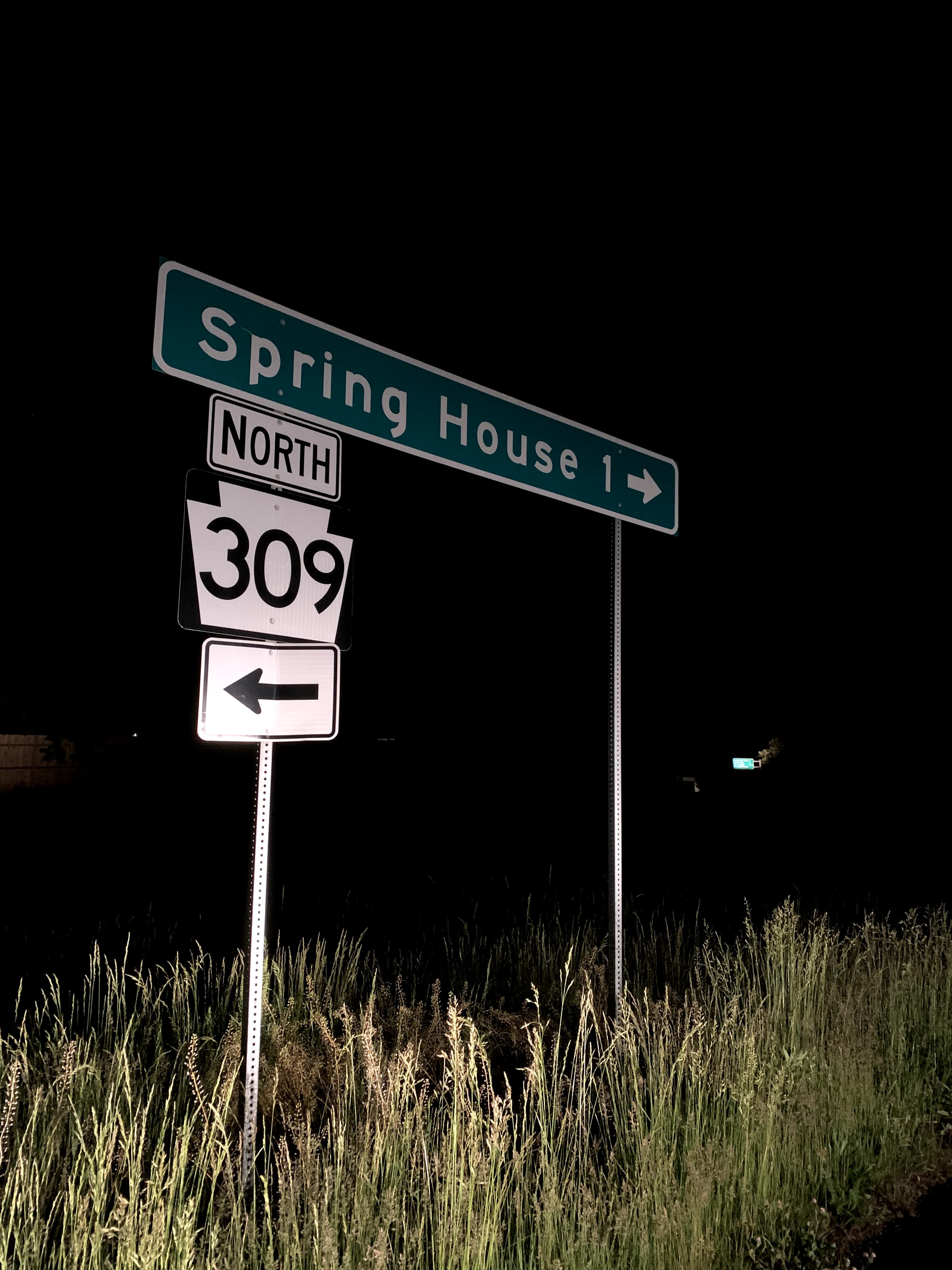
A sign for Spring House on PA 309

Spring House is located at 40°10′59″N 75°13′52″W (40.183091, -75.231204).

According to the United States Census Bureau, the CDP has a total area of 2.6 square miles (6.7 km^{2}), all land.

== Demographics ==
Historical population
Census	Pop.	Note	%±
1990	2,782		—
2000	3,290		18.3%
2010	3,804		15.6%
2020	3,978		4.6%

=== 2020 census ===
As of the 2020 census, Spring House had a population of 3,978. The median age was 51.5 years. 18.5% of residents were under the age of 18 and 32.2% of residents were 65 years of age or older. For every 100 females there were 85.5 males, and for every 100 females age 18 and over there were 82.2 males age 18 and over.

100.0% of residents lived in urban areas, while 0.0% lived in rural areas.

There were 1,545 households in Spring House, of which 21.9% had children under the age of 18 living in them. Of all households, 58.2% were married-couple households, 10.6% were households with a male householder and no spouse or partner present, and 29.3% were households with a female householder and no spouse or partner present. About 32.5% of all households were made up of individuals and 26.2% had someone living alone who was 65 years of age or older.

There were 1,638 housing units, of which 5.7% were vacant. The homeowner vacancy rate was 2.1% and the rental vacancy rate was 10.8%.

Racial composition as of the 2020 census
Race	Number	Percent
White	3,074	77.3%
Black or African American	123	3.1%
American Indian and Alaska Native	2	0.1%
Asian	566	14.2%
Native Hawaiian and Other Pacific Islander	0	0.0%
Some other race	52	1.3%
Two or more races	161	4.0%
Hispanic or Latino (of any race)	120	3.0%

=== 2010 census ===
As of the 2010 census, the CDP was 87.2% Non-Hispanic White, 2.3% Black or African American, 7.8% Asian, 0.2% were Some Other Race, and 1.1% were two or more races. 1.8% of the population were of Hispanic or Latino ancestry.

=== 2000 census ===
At the 2000 census there were 3,290 people, 1,347 households, and 893 families living in the CDP. The population density was 1,275.1 inhabitants per square mile (492.3/km^{2}). There were 1,396 housing units at an average density of 541.0 per square mile (208.9/km^{2}). The racial makeup of the CDP was 93.50% White, 2.28% African American, 3.59% Asian, 0.03% Pacific Islander, 0.15% from other races, and 0.46% from two or more races. Hispanic or Latino of any race were 0.67%.

There were 1,347 households, 26.9% had children under the age of 18 living with them, 60.9% were married couples living together, 4.5% had a female householder with no husband present, and 33.7% were non-families. 31.6% of households were made up of individuals, and 22.2% were one person aged 65 or older. The average household size was 2.31 and the average family size was 2.92.

The age distribution was 21.3% under the age of 18, 2.9% from 18 to 24, 19.1% from 25 to 44, 27.1% from 45 to 64, and 29.5% 65 or older. The median age was 49 years. For every 100 females, there were 78.1 males. For every 100 females age 18 and over, there were 73.5 males.

The median household income was $89,000 and the median family income was $118,256. Males had a median income of $100,000 versus $63,571 for females. The per capita income for the CDP was $47,661. About 1.1% of families and 3.1% of the population were below the poverty line, including 5.0% of those under age 18 and 1.5% of those age 65 or over.

== Economy ==
The Commission on Accreditation of Healthcare Management Education, an academic accrediting body, is based in Spring House.

== Education ==
It is part of the Wissahickon School District
