= Wissahickon High School =

Public high school in Ambler, Pennsylvania, United States

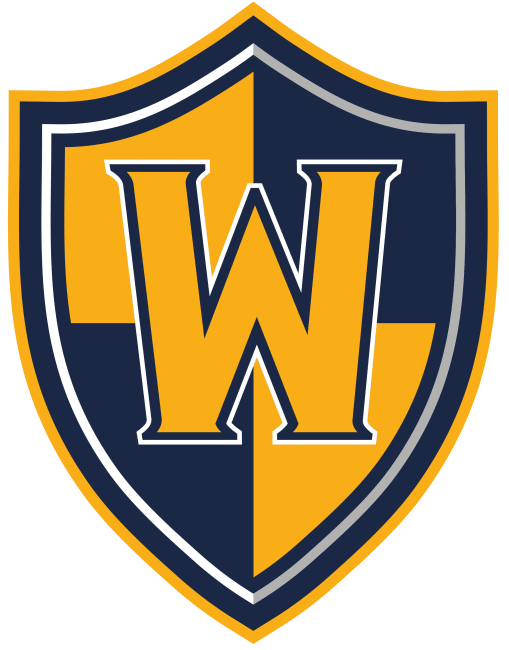

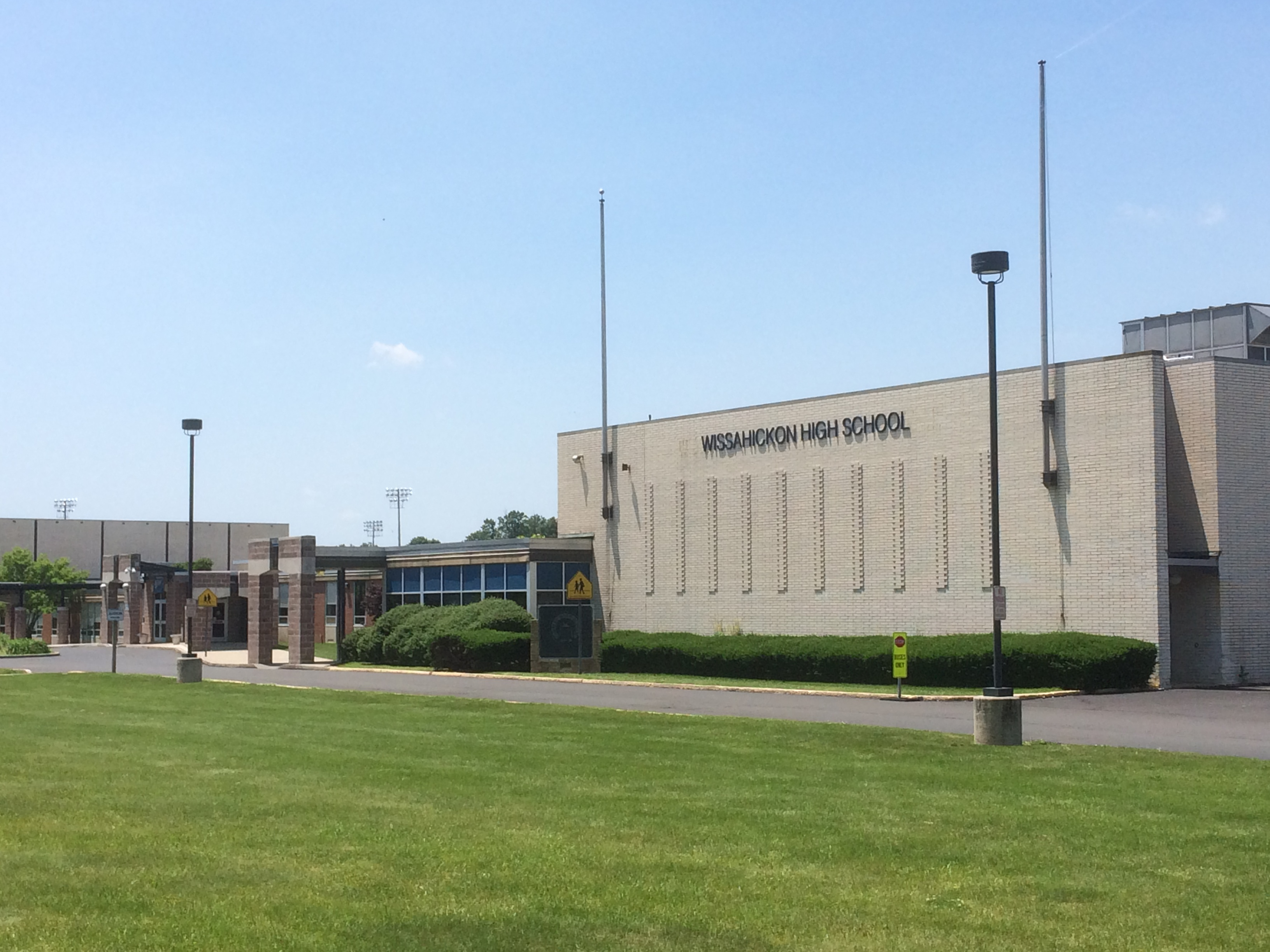
- Wissahickon High School in 2017

Location
- 521 Houston Road; Ambler, Pennsylvania; United States; 40°10′18″N 75°13′40″W

Information
- Type: Public
- Established: 1962
- School district: Wissahickon School District
- Principal: Lynne Blair
- Teaching staff: 116.25 (FTE)
- Enrollment: 1,457 (2023–2024)
- Student to teacher ratio: 12.53
- Colors: Blue and gold
- Slogan: True Blue With a Heart of Gold
- Mascot: Trojan
- Nickname: Trojans
- Rival: Upper Dublin High School
- Newspaper: The Trojan Times
- Website: whs.wsdweb.org

Wissahickon High School is the sole public high school of the Wissahickon School District, and is located in Lower Gwynedd Township, Pennsylvania, with an Ambler postal address.

The school is recognized as a National Blue Ribbon School of Excellence by the United States Department of Education.

In 2021, Wissahickon High School was ranked as the 12th best public high school in Pennsylvania and 384th in the nation by Niche. U.S. News & World Report 2021 ranked WHS #12 best in the state and #517 in the nation.

== Athletics ==
The Wissahickon athletic department is currently admitted under the Pennsylvania Interscholastic Athletic Association (PIAA) and by school size is sanctioned under District I. The high school boasts 2 artificial turf fields, 1 stadium, and a natatorium which serves the Wissahickon football, men's and women's track and field, men and women's soccer, men's and women's lacrosse, women's field hockey, men's and women's swimming & diving (Tess), men's and women's water polo, and numerous community club teams. Wissahickon has an athletic rivalry with Upper Dublin High School.

=== Baseball ===
The Wissahickon basketball team is ranked 10th in Philadelphia by CSN philly.com. The program changed coaches in 2008 and again in 2013 and has steadily worked their way back to conference champions and state contenders.

=== Tennis ===
The 2011 Wissahickon boys tennis team made states for the first time in school history.

=== Soccer ===
The soccer team in 2010 was ranked up to 10th in the state and 7th in the area at the end of the season by the Philly Inquirer.

=== Track and Field ===
The Boys track team has won the American Conference Championship 10 of the last 12 years and boasts 21 individual Pa. State Champions, 3 State Relay Champions, 80 State Medalists (2nd thru 8th) and has won 3 State Championship team titles (1967 'B', 1972 'A', 1982 'AAA').

=== Football ===
The Trojan football team were the 1973 & 1987 BuxMont Champions and 2007 PIAA Suburban One - American Champions.

=== Hockey ===
The Trojan hockey team won first place in the Delaware Valley Hockey League in the 2014–2015 season.

== Extracurriculars ==
=== Computer Club ===
Teams "StackTrace" and "NullPointerException" both representing Wissahickon High School earned first and second place respectively in Pennsylvania for Lockheed Martin's 2021 CYBERQUEST competition.

=== Student Council ===
The Wissahickon High School Student Council strives to encourage school pride and provide a meaningful school experience for all students.

The Wissahickon High School Student Council is overseen by two faculty advisors. Its student leadership consists of four elected student executives (president, vice president, treasurer, and secretary) and 16 student senators (four members from each grade level).

=== QuizBowl ===
The school's QuizBowl team competed in the 2016-2017 QuizNet National Championship and the 2012 and 2022 Pennsylvania Academic Championship. The team competed in the 2022 NAQT High School National Championship Tournament in Atlanta, Georgia.

=== Ultimate ===
The Wissahickon Ultimate Frisbee club was ranked #5 among men's high school teams in 2022. Team captain Adam Grossberg was listed on the 2022 Philadelphia Phoenix roster.

=== Wissahickon Alumni Partnership ===
The Wissahickon Alumni Partnership (W.A.P.) clubs celebrates the accomplishments of current and past Wissahickon students.

=== Wissahickon Marching Unit ===
Third place bronze finalist and "Most Improved" award in 2019 for the Independence A Division Cavalcade of Bands State Championships.

=== Jazz At Wissahickon ===
Wissahickon has had a jazz band since 1926 and is currently under the direction of Margaret Oswald. The focal points of the jazz department are the One O’clock and Two O’clock Bands. The names were acquired after Neil Slator, former director of the North Texas One O’clock Lab Band, was a guest director for PMEA all state jazz band, which was held at Wissahickon in the late 1990s.

Today Wissahickon's jazz department consists of two big bands, two jazz combos, a Gypsy Jazz Ensemble, a Trad Jazz ensemble, a Brass Band, and a subway band.

== Notable alumni ==
- Casey Cavaliere — guitarist of rock band The Wonder Years
- E-Dubble — musician, rapper
- Stephen Hahn — 24th Commissioner of Food and Drugs
- Mike Kennedy — drummer of rock band The Wonder Years
- Tanoh Kpassagnon — defensive end for New Orleans Saints, Super Bowl LIV champion
- Bryan Lentz — Pennsylvania House of Representatives, District 161 from 2007 to 2011
- Josh Martin — bassist of rock band The Wonder Years
- Sandy Martin, class of 1967 — actress
- Melanie Mayron — actress
- Katie O'Donnell — U.S. national field hockey team, Sportswoman of the Year 2010
- Kurt Hugo Schneider — musician, composer, producer, YouTuber
- Gerald Stano, class of 1971 — American convicted serial killer
- Genki Suzuki — American gymnast
- Sam Tsui — musician, YouTuber
- Nolan Carter— Punter for Monmouth University, Big 33 Selection, First Team All State

== Gallery ==
Lapse of inner courtyard taken from Mr. Ford's AP Physics 1 class

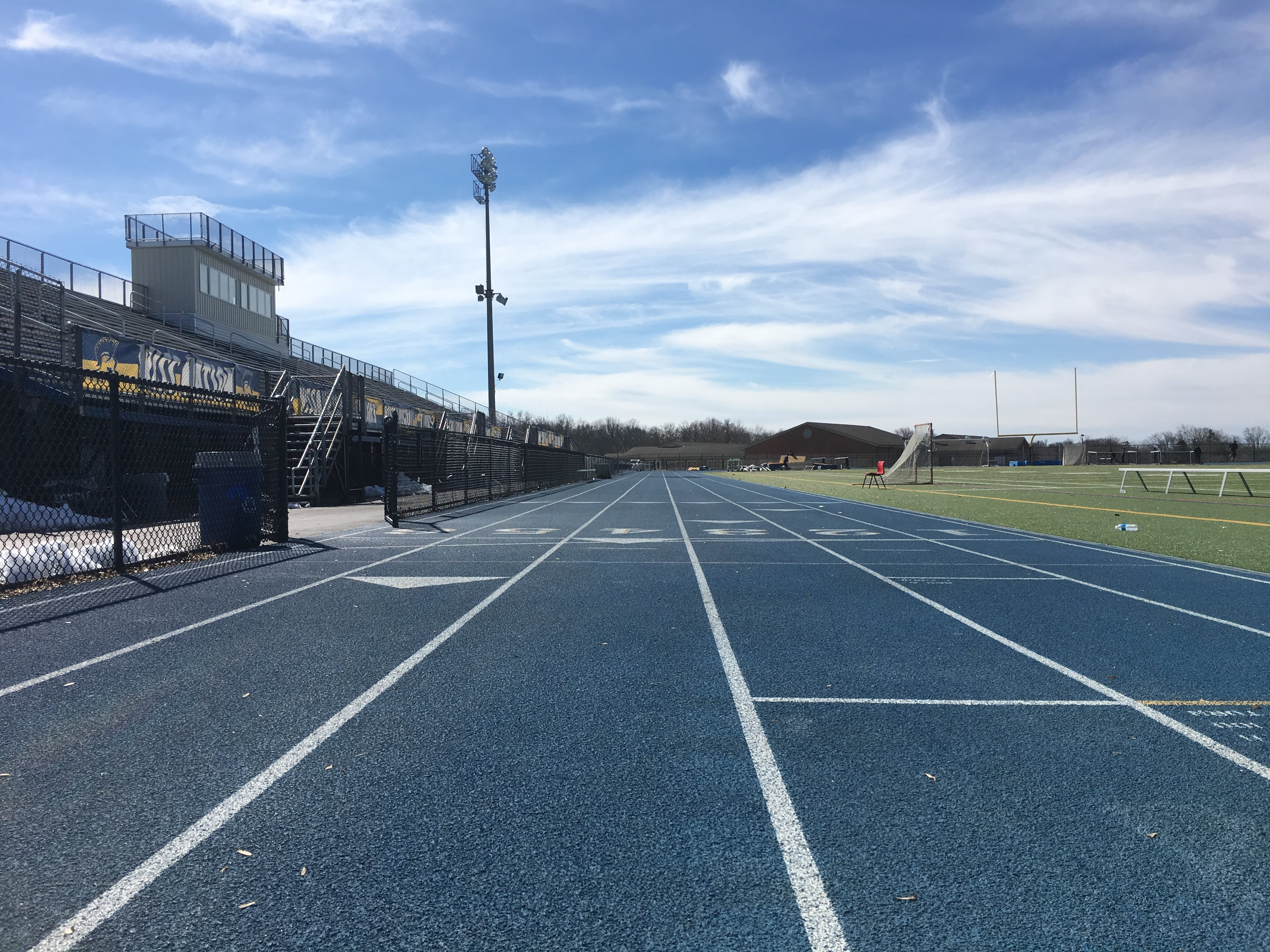
The school's track

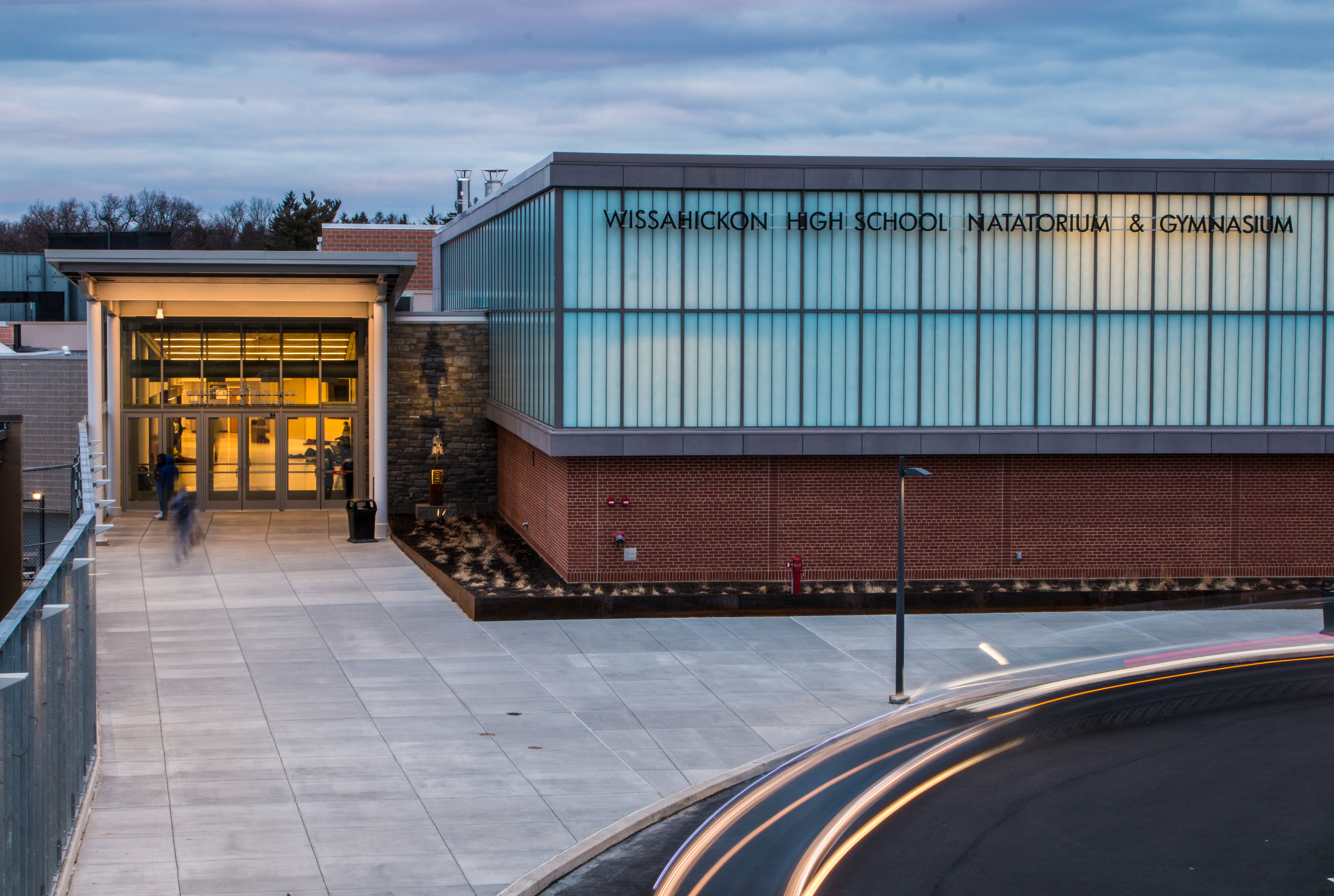
The Natatorium at Wissahickon High School

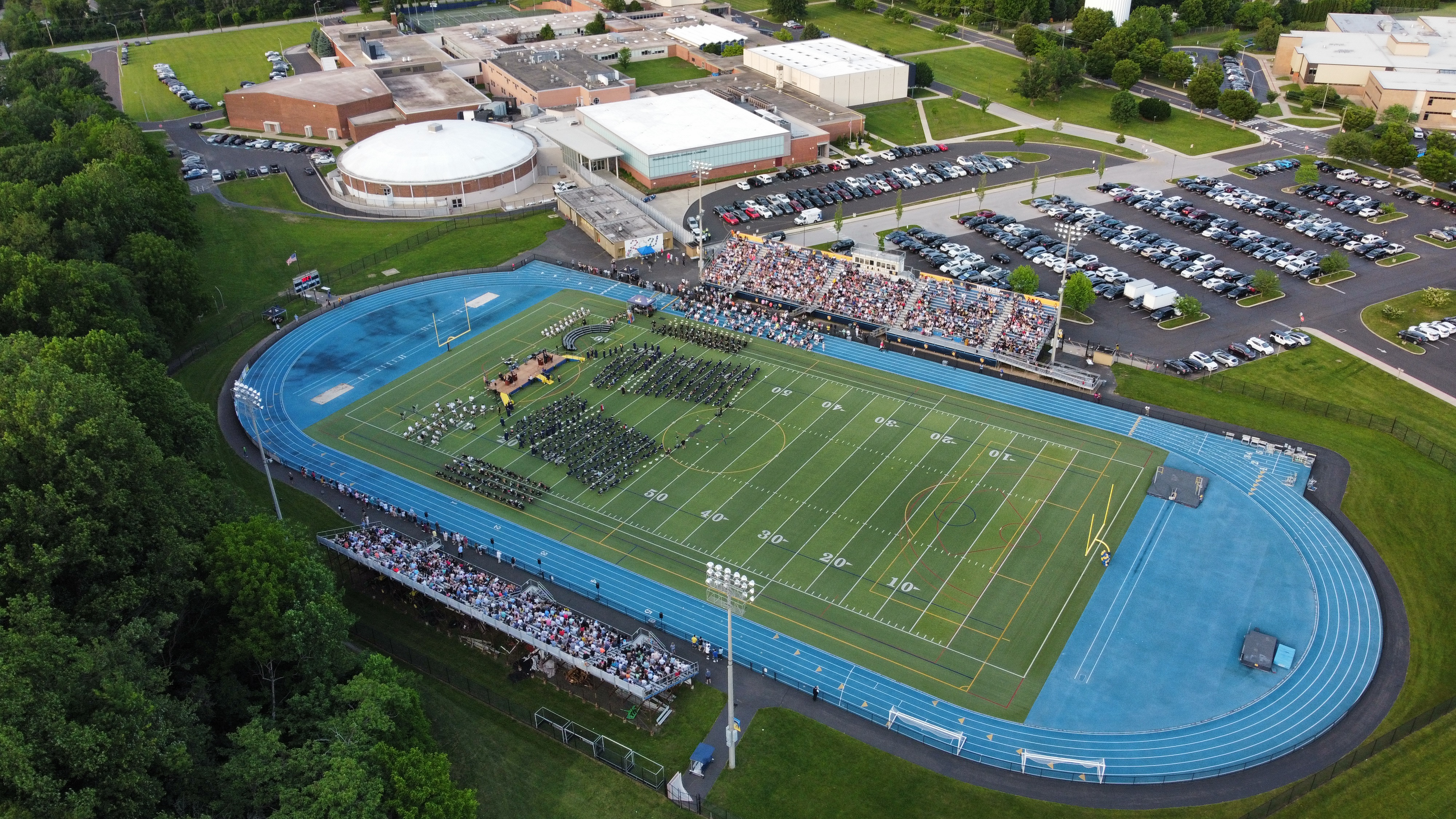
Aerial view of Wissahickon High School during the class of 2021 graduation
