= Wissahickon School District =

School district in Pennsylvania

Address
- 601 Knight Road Ambler, Montgomery, Pennsylvania, 19002; United States
- Coordinates: 40.16757°N 75.23171°W

District information
- Type: Public
- Motto: True Blue with a Heart of Gold
- Grades: Kindergarten – 12
- Superintendent: Dr. Mwenyewe Dawan

Students and staff
- Enrollment: 5,092 (2022–23)
- Faculty: 371.26 (FTE)
- Staff: 320.50 (FTE)
- Student–teacher ratio: 13.72
- District mascot: Trojans
- Colours: Blue and gold

Other information
- Website: wsdweb.org

The Wissahickon School District is a public school district in Montgomery County, Pennsylvania. The school district serves the borough of Ambler and the townships of Lower Gwynedd and Whitpain, all of which are Philadelphia suburbs. The district currently enrolls 5,092 students.

== History ==
A copy of the website stated that the district was created in 1964. The logo stated that the year of establishment was 1966.

== Schools ==
- Blue Bell Elementary School - serves central Whitpain Township
- Lower Gwynedd Elementary School - serves Lower Gwynedd Township, Spring House, PA and parts of Ambler, PA
- Shady Grove Elementary School - serves eastern Whitpain Township and parts of Ambler, PA
- Stony Creek Elementary School - serves western Whitpain Township
- Wissahickon Middle School - located in Lower Gwynedd Township but also serves Whitpain Township
- Wissahickon High School - located in Lower Gwynedd Township but also serves Whitpain Township
- Wissahickon Virtual Academy - virtual school for learners who reside within the boundaries of Wissahickon School District.

=== Former schools ===
Mattison Avenue Elementary School was formerly in Ambler. In 1975 someone had proposed combining grades 2-3, but the school board that year canceled the proposal. The school closed in 2013, and its territory was divided between Lower Gwynedd and Shady Grove elementary schools. The WSD Head Start, formerly in the Mattison Avenue school, continued to operate, but had to move somewhere else. In 2015 the Ambler borough hall began to occupy the former school.

There was an Ambler Junior High School. It closed by 1975. That year there was a controversy on how the school should be rezoned. A company wanted to have apartment units installed in the former junior high school property, while some members of the city council opposed this. The Reporter of Lansdale, Pennsylvania argued that the development proposals should be known to the public.

There was previously another elementary school, Forest Avenue Elementary School in Ambler. By 1976 it had closed, with the district no longer using the property and leaving it unmaintained. The Senior Adults for Greater Adventure (SAGA) organization operated its Ambler center in that facility.
