= Maple Glen, Pennsylvania =

Unincorporated community in Pennsylvania, US

Maple Glen
- Census-designated place
- Location of Maple Glen in Pennsylvania Maple Glen (the United States)
- Coordinates: 40°10′31″N 75°10′48″W
- Country: United States
- State: Pennsylvania
- County: Montgomery
- Townships: Upper Dublin, Horsham

Area
  - Total: 3.12 sq mi (8.08 km^{2})
  - Land: 3.12 sq mi (8.08 km^{2})
  - Water: 0 sq mi (0.00 km^{2})
- Elevation: 374 ft (114 m)

Population (2020)
  - Total: 6,647
  - Density: 2,131.2/sq mi (822.87/km^{2})
- Time zone: UTC-5 (EST)
  - Summer (DST): UTC-4 (EDT)
- ZIP code: 19002, 19044
- Area codes: 215, 267, and 445
- FIPS code: 42-47152

Maple Glen is a census-designated place (CDP) in Upper Dublin Township, and Horsham Township, Pennsylvania, United States. The population was 6,647 at the 2020 census.

== Geography ==
Maple Glen is located at 40°10′31″N 75°10′48″W (40.175358, -75.180131).

According to the United States Census Bureau, the CDP has a total area of 3.1 square miles (8.0 km^{2}), all land.

== Demographics ==
Historical population
Census	Pop.	Note	%±
1990	5,881		—
2000	7,042		19.7%
2010	6,742		−4.3%
2020	6,647		−1.4%

As of the 2010 census, the CDP was 85.8% Non-Hispanic White, 2.7% Black or African American, 0.1% Native American and Alaskan Native, 8.6% Asian, 0.4% were Some Other Race, and 1.0% were two or more races. 2.0% of the population were of Hispanic or Latino ancestry.

At the 2000 census there were 7,042 people, 2,319 households, and 1,971 families living in the CDP. The population density was 2,273.4 inhabitants per square mile (877.8/km^{2}). There were 2,349 housing units at an average density of 758.3 per square mile (292.8/km^{2}). The racial makeup of the CDP was 92.25% White, 2.12% African American, 0.16% Native American, 4.57% Asian, 0.31% from other races, and 0.60% from two or more races. Hispanic or Latino of any race were 1.46%.

There were 2,319 households, 47.6% had children under the age of 18 living with them, 75.0% were married couples living together, 7.3% had a female householder with no husband present, and 15.0% were non-families. 12.5% of households were made up of individuals, and 3.9% were one person aged 65 or older. The average household size was 3.01 and the average family size was 3.31.

The age distribution was 31.6% under the age of 18, 4.8% from 18 to 24, 30.7% from 25 to 44, 23.1% from 45 to 64, and 9.8% 65 or older. The median age was 37 years. For every 100 females, there were 98.0 males. For every 100 females age 18 and over, there were 93.3 males.

The median household income was $80,076 and the median family income of four was $80,760. Males had a median income of $57,196 versus $36,875 for females. The per capita income for the CDP was $33,058. About 1.4% of families and 1.5% of the population were below the poverty line, including 1.7% of those under age 18 and 3.7% of those age 65 or over.

== Education ==
Upper Dublin School District (for portions in Upper Dublin Township) and Hatboro-Horsham School District (for portions in Horsham Township) operate area public schools.

There is an area Catholic grade school, Our Lady of Mercy Regional Catholic School, in Maple Glen. Our Lady of Mercy was formed in 2012 by the merger of St. Alphonsus in Maple Glen, St. Anthony-St. Joseph in Ambler, and St. Catherine of Siena in Horsham.
