= Hatboro-Horsham Senior High School =

Hatboro-Horsham High School
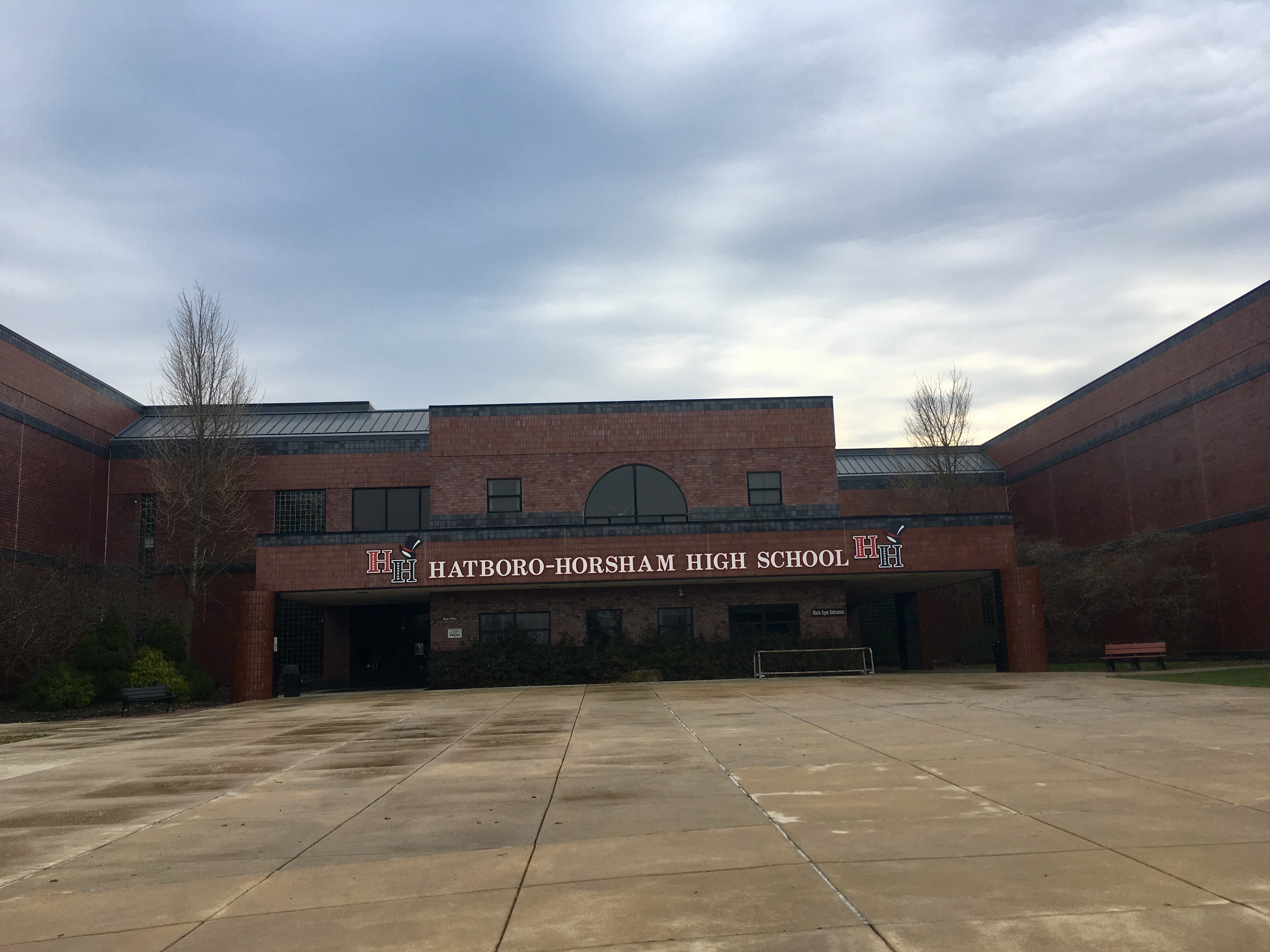
- Front of the Hatboro-Horsham High School Building

Location
- 899 Horsham Road; Horsham, Pennsylvania 19044; United States; 40.197°N 75.164°W

Information
- School type: Public
- Established: 1992, 1998 (renovation/addition)
- School board: Hatboro-Horsham Board of School Directors
- School district: Hatboro-Horsham School District
- Principal: Dennis Williams
- Faculty: 119.43 (FTE)
- Grades: 9–12
- Enrollment: 1,339 (2023–2024)
- Student to teacher ratio: 11.21
- Colors: Red and Black
- Slogan: "Champions of Learning"
- Athletics conference: Suburban One League - Continental
- Mascot: Mad Hatter, Top Hats
- Team name: Hatters
- Rival: Upper Moreland High School
- Publication: The Golden Pen (literary magazine)
- Newspaper: The Hat Chat
- Yearbook: The Hi-Hatter
- Website: www.hatboro-horsham.org/o/hhs

Hatboro-Horsham High School is a comprehensive public high school, serving grades 9–12, located in Horsham Township, Pennsylvania, about 17 miles outside of Philadelphia. Hatboro-Horsham Senior High School, a successor of the Loller Academy, originally opened in 1950 on Old York Road in Hatboro following the jointure of the Hatboro-Horsham School District. In 1964, the high school relocated to Meetinghouse Road, originally built as Keith Valley Junior High in 1957. The Meetinghouse campus currently houses Keith Valley Middle School. In 1991, the school was moved into a new building, its current location, on Pennsylvania Route 463 (Horsham Road). It is the only high school in the Hatboro-Horsham School District which includes Horsham Township, Montgomery County, Pennsylvania and Hatboro, Pennsylvania. Its only feeder school is Keith Valley Middle School. Hatboro-Horsham is a member of the Suburban One League Continental Conference and offers a variety of sports programs. Extracurricular activities are also offered in the form of performing arts, school publications, and clubs.

Hatboro-Horsham High School is recognized by the United States Department of Education as a Blue Ribbon School of Excellence, and has been named one of the top 150 high schools in the nation by Redbook Magazine. The school is fully accredited by the Pennsylvania Department of Education and in 2006 was recommended for full accreditation by the Middle States Commission on Secondary Schools.

== Campus and facilities ==
The current Hatboro-Horsham High School campus was completed in 1991 by Boro Developers at a cost of $16,157,971.00. This campus-like project represented a $30 million final construction price and became the flagship school in the Philadelphia metropolitan area. The new facility included the installation of state-of-the-art technology and science equipment and one of the most complete auditorium and stage sound and lighting systems available. The building represented over $3.5 million worth of masonry work and brickwork, all accomplished by Boro, and was most notable for its architectural requirements and excellent workmanship. A new wing housing additional classrooms was built at the rear of the building in 1998. The Hatters Swim Team utilizes the pool located at the adjacent Simmons Elementary School, which formerly housed Keith Valley Middle School.

Hatters Way crosses through the campus, allowing access to and from Pennsylvania Route 463 (Horsham Road) and Babylon Road, as well as connecting it with Simmons Elementary School and the Jarrett Nature Center. The road, which crosses over the Davis Grove Tributary, had previously been susceptible to flooding until a $24,375 embankment stabilization project that replaced sidewalk and pavement destroyed by flooding during Hurricane Irene in 2011.

Hatters Stadium, located adjacent to the High School, underwent a $1 million renovation during the 2010-2011 school year, which included the installation of an artificial turf field, track resurfacing, updated irrigation systems, a new sound system, electrical rewiring, and fiber optic capability. Topsoil that was removed from the stadium was transferred to other district athletic fields that are used for soccer, field hockey, baseball, softball and lacrosse. A large controversy developed during the 2010-2011 school year, as the planning of the turf field coincided with comprehensive budget cuts and tense teacher contract negotiations. Students, parents, and teachers squared off against the administration and the school board in a series of passionate and crowded board meetings. As the board approved a nearly $1 million artificial turf field installation, many protested the cutting of 24 Advanced Placement courses and electives, possible furloughs for up to 22 teachers, and possible cancellations, postponements, or venue changes for district events, particularly graduation for the Class of 2011, and the annual Relay for Life. Eventually, however, the Relay for Life and graduation were held as regularly scheduled, and furloughs were only issued for one full-time teacher and five part-time positions in the district.

== Extracurriculars ==
Hatboro-Horsham High School offers a number of diverse extracurricular activities for students.

=== Hatters Robotics ===
Hatters Robotics is Hatboro-Horsham's FIRST Robotics Competition team. Also known as Team 708, Hatters Robotics was founded in 2001 by the Hatboro-Horsham School District in partnership with Motorola with the name “Hardwired Hatters”. A few years later, Laura Shepler, a former FIRST mentor, expressed interest in forming, or joining, a FIRST team for the Upper Moreland School District. In 2005, the Upper Moreland School District “fused” resources with Hatboro-Horsham and established a team with the name “Hardwired Fusion” to better represent the union of the two districts. At first this seemed rather ironic because Hatboro-Horsham and Upper Moreland were infamous rivals in all other competitive sports, other than robotics.

Between 2005 and 2006, the team grew under the sponsorship of Immunicon and AMI Semiconductors. In his first full season as Chief Advisor in 2008, Eric Zygmont secured the support of both Upper Moreland and Hatboro-Horsham’s Educational Foundations, as well as the Jannsen Pharmaceutical Corporation. Team 708 continued to grow and was sponsored by seven separate organizations during the 2015 season including Lockheed Martin, the Hatboro-Horsham Educational Foundation, Autodesk, Hatboro Federal Savings, First Niagara, and Verizon.

=== Student Council ===
In union with the mission of Hatboro-Horsham High School, the student council strives to ensure that all students are actively engaged in the community, and encourages students to initiate and participate in school affairs.

The student council works to promote community through social and educational programming, and further activities and programs that provide opportunities for as many students to become involved as possible. The student council seeks to voice the opinions, interests, and concerns of the Hatboro-Horsham student body.

The student council continuously strives to foster a harmonious atmosphere throughout the school by developing a sense of responsibility for conduct and behavior among students, as well as encouraging pride in the appearance of school buildings and grounds.

=== Interact ===
Interact is the high school extension of Rotary International. It is a community service club which has an obligation to perform at least one local and international project each year, as dictated by its international Constitution. Sponsored by the Rotary clubs of Hatboro and Horsham, Hatboro-Horsham's chapter has gone on to volunteer at senior citizens centers, entertain young cancer patients at Gilda's Club, and participate in the annual Relay for Life of Eastern Montgomery County.

=== HHTV ===
HHTV was founded in 2004, and is owned and operated by Hatboro-Horsham School District. HHTV can be seen on channel 28 for Comcast Subscribers and channel 33 for Verizon Subscribers. HHTV live programming can now be seen on the HHTV website or on the HHSD YouTube Channel in High Definition. Programming for HHTV is produced by the School District and its students to inform, educate, and entertain viewers about the School District. HHTV has been providing students with first-hand relevant opportunities to dive into the world of both film and television production, and has served as a springboard for many alumni currently involved in the entertainment industry.

=== Theatre Club ===
Hatboro-Horsham's Theatre Club provides students with experience in several areas, including Lighting/Sound, Scenery, Costumes, Acting, and Publicity. The Theatre Club is dedicated to providing leadership opportunities for students involved with theatre arts, increasing community recognition of and participation in the theatre program, and providing a comprehensive background of both performance and technical theatre for all students. The Theatre Club provides educational opportunities for students who may not be cast in the Fall Drama or Spring Musical, but still possess interest in theatre and performance. To raise funds in order to build a stronger theatre program, the Theatre Club holds several fundraisers throughout the year. The Theatre Club also plans workshops, field trips, and social activities. The Hatboro-Horsham Theatre Club is affiliated with the International Thespian Society.

=== The Golden Pen ===
The Golden Pen is an annual publication, edited and designed by students, that includes student writing, artwork and a music CD. Any student may submit an original poem, short story, artwork of any media, or song. The editors and staff review all work anonymously and accept for publication work that is deemed appropriate for the magazine. The criteria are suitability for audience, originality, creativity, exceptional quality and perhaps, connection to the theme of the magazine.

=== The HatChat ===
The HatChat, founded in 1930, is the official school newspaper of Hatboro-Horsham High School. It is written, printed, and edited by approximately 40 students, 15 editors, and one faculty advisor. The HatChat publishes articles by students about sports, school news, arts and entertainment, as well as editorials. The HatChat is distributed monthly or bimonthly to students, parents, teachers and subscribers. The HatChat is read by over 2500 students, faculty, and community members throughout the Hatboro-Horsham School District, and can also be read through an online supplement posted on High School website. The HatChat is a member of the National Scholastic Press Association and maintains First Class Distinction from this organization. The HatChat is also certified by the Journalism Education Association and has attained a Keystone Rating from the Pennsylvania School Press Association.

=== Model United Nations ===
Hatboro-Horsham's Model United Nations Club has been recognized as one of the areas premier international relations bodies. The club attends several conferences and events throughout the United States, and serves as an academic simulation of the United Nations that aims to educate participants about current events, topics in international relations, diplomacy and the United Nations agenda. The participants role-play as diplomats representing a nation or NGO in a simulated session of a committee of the United Nations, such as the Security Council or the General Assembly. Participants research a country, take on roles as diplomats, investigate international issues, debate, deliberate, consult, and then develop solutions to world problems.

=== World Affairs Club ===
Hatboro-Horsham's World Affairs Club has earned a spot among the nation's top discursive bodies. The club attends several conferences and events sponsored by the World Affairs Council of Philadelphia, and discusses current international events on a regular basis.

== Eastern Center for Arts and Technology ==
Students at Hatboro-Horsham have the option to attend the Eastern Center for Arts and Technology, which is accredited by the Middle State Association of Colleges and Schools. The campus is located in Willow Grove and is owned by nine school districts in Eastern Montgomery County, Pennsylvania. They include Abington, Bryn Athyn, Cheltenham, Hatboro-Horsham, Jenkintown, Upper Moreland, Lower Moreland, Springfield, and Upper Dublin.

Programs taken at the Eastern Center are considered part of the high school program and count as elective credit toward graduation. They give students the opportunity to reinforce their career path after high school, get ready for employment, and get a head start in collegiate studies in that field.

== Notable alumni ==
=== Politics ===
- Roy Cornell — former Pennsylvania State Representative who represented the 152nd district
- Todd Stephens — former Pennsylvania State Representative who represented the 151st district
- Tony Payton — former Pennsylvania State Representative who represented the 179th district
- Brian D. Miller - Currently United States Attorney; former Special IG for Pandemic Recovery; former Senior Associate White House Counsel; former Inspector General for the U.S. GSA.
- Kurt Volker — former Permanent U.S. Ambassador to NATO

=== Sports - ===
- Matt Carroll — college basketball player for Notre Dame, professionally for the NBA's Portland Trail Blazers, San Antonio Spurs, Charlotte Bobcats, and the Dallas Mavericks
- Pat Carroll — college basketball player for Saint Joseph's University, and professionally for CB Sevilla of Spain's Asociación de Clubs de Baloncesto
- Casey Comber — Pan American Games medalist, and a middle distance runner
- Greg Erwin — former crew chief for Wood Brothers Racing driver Matt DiBenedetto in the NASCAR Cup Series
- Dan Heisman — United States Chess Federation chess master and author
- Brian Kuklick — former American football quarterback

=== Music ===
- Kenny Vasoli — lead singer/bassist of the band The Starting Line, Person L, and Vacationer

== Achievements ==
=== Music ===
The Hatboro-Horsham Marching Unit won the Mid-Atlantic Region in 1975, 1988, 1990, 1993, 1996, 1997 2009, 2012, 2013, and 2015. In 2014 & 2016 the unit earned Silver finalist (2nd place) finishes in the COB Liberty Open Class championships, winning awards for Best Percussion and Best Overall Music. This is the unit's 8th consecutive medalist finish. championships. The name was the changed to Hatboro Horsham Marching Ensemble, in 2018. Their most recent show “Da Vinci’s Vision” won 3rd place and high percussion at the Calvalcade of Bands Championship.

The indoor percussion unit, or performance ensemble (HHIPE), won the Tournament Indoor SE PA regional championships in 2009, 2010, 2013, and 2014. They won the TIA Atlantic-Coast Championships in 2009, 2010, 2012, 2013, and 2014. In addition, they won the Cavalcade Indoor Association Championships in 2010 and 2013. In Winter Guard International, the unit has competed in the NE US Regionals since 1995. In 1995 Hatboro - Horsham "Innovations" was the WGI Scholastic Gold Medalist..

=== Innovation ===
In March 2010, Hatboro-Horsham High School hosted the first Green Futures Fair in Montgomery County, PA to give students from HHSD and other nearby districts a chance to learn about advances and possible careers in the "green field."

=== Athletics ===
The Lady Hatters softball team won the 2008 PIAA Class AAAA state softball championship, beating Greater Latrobe High School 3-0. The Hatters Ice Hockey won the 2018 shshl championship The Lady Hatters Volleyball Team has also made it to states and placed third out of four in the 2009 season.The Hatters won back to back PIAA state championships in girls' cross country in 2002 and 2003. The boys' cross country teams also won a state championship in 1993.

The Hatboro-Horsham baseball team won the Suburban One Continental League Championship and made it to the PIAA Class AAAA State baseball Semifinal in 2012, where they lost to eventual state champion, La Salle College High School. The Hatters had an overall record of 22-5.

The Lady Hatters Swim and Dive team placed 1st at the 2022 PIAA AAA state championship winning by 63 points to second place Conestoga. Their head coach Kip Emig was named PIAA Swim and Dive coach of the year.

== Traditions ==
Until 2019, Hatboro-Horsham played Upper Moreland High School annually on Thanksgiving Day. Post-pandemic, it's now the first game of the season for both teams. On August 26, 2022, Upper Moreland beat Hatboro-Horsham 41-0.
