= Matt Carroll (basketball) =

American basketball player (born 1980)

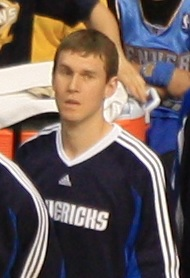
- Carroll with the Dallas Mavericks in 2009

Personal information
- Born: August 28, 1980 (age 46) Pittsburgh, Pennsylvania, U.S.
- Listed height: 6 ft 6 in (1.98 m)
- Listed weight: 212 lb (96 kg)

Career information
- High school: Hatboro-Horsham (Horsham, Pennsylvania)
- College: Notre Dame (1999–2003)
- NBA draft: 2003: undrafted
- Playing career: 2003–2012
- Position: Shooting guard
- Number: 31, 3, 13, 33

Career history
- 2003–2004: Portland Trail Blazers
- 2004–2005: Roanoke Dazzle
- 2004: San Antonio Spurs
- 2005–2009: Charlotte Bobcats
- 2009–2010: Dallas Mavericks
- 2010–2012: Charlotte Bobcats

Career highlights
- NBDL Most Valuable Player (2005); All-NBDL First Team (2005); First-team All-Big East (2003)

Career NBA statistics
- Points: 3,013 (6.6 ppg)
- Rebounds: 863 (1.9 rpg)
- Assists: 313 (0.7 apg)
- Stats at NBA.com
- Stats at Basketball Reference
Medals
Men's basketball
Representing United States
FIBA Americas U18 Championship
Gold medal – first place	1998 Puerto Plata	Team competition
FIBA U19 World Championship
Silver medal – second place	1999 Lisbon	Team competition

Matthew John Carroll (born August 28, 1980) is an American former professional basketball player.

Carroll is 6 ft 6 in (1.98 m) tall and weighs 212 lb (96 kg). He played high school basketball at Hatboro-Horsham High School in Horsham, Pennsylvania, under coach Walt Ostrowski. He played college basketball for the Notre Dame Fighting Irish.

== Early career ==
At Hatboro-Horsham High School, Carroll averaged 26.5 points, 7.3 rebounds and four assists per game as a senior shooting guard. He recorded even more rebounds and assists his first three seasons, when he started at point guard for the Hatters.

At the end of high school, Carroll ranked second in scoring in the history of southeastern Pennsylvania, trailing only former Los Angeles Lakers star Kobe Bryant. Carroll surpassed Bryant by becoming the only Pennsylvania player to be named Mr. Basketball twice.

Basketball gurus around the nation noticed, as they twice selected Carroll for the United States Junior National Team. That selection teamed Carroll up with players such as the Orlando Magic's Mike Miller, Stanford's Casey Jacobsen and Arizona's Michael Wright to compete in the Dominican Republic in 1998 and Portugal in 1999.

In addition to the U.S. junior national team, Carroll made it onto the roster for prep all-star games such as the Magic Johnson Roundball Classic, where he finally had the chance to play for his grandfather, and the Capital Classic in Washington, D.C.

He was recruited by coach John MacLeod, played for Matt Doherty as a freshman and played the rest of his college career for former Delaware coach Mike Brey at the University of Notre Dame.

== College career ==
Carroll played in 133 games over his four-year career at the University of Notre Dame and averaged 13.9 points, 4.3 rebounds, 2.4 assists and 0.9 steals. He finished sixth on Notre Dame's all-time leading scoring list with 1,850 points.

Carroll also ranks as Notre Dame's second all-time leader in three-point field goals made (301) behind Colin Falls (331), three-point field goals attempted (762), games played (133), games started (125) and second in free throw percentage (.825). He scored in double figures in 96 of 133 career games. He was named All-American Honorable Mention by the Associated Press and All-Big East First Team as a senior.

== Professional career ==
Carroll entered the 2003 NBA draft but went undrafted. He signed with the New York Knicks as a free agent and played in their summer league. He spent the 2003–04 training camp with New York and was one of the Knicks' final cuts.

=== Portland Trail Blazers ===
Carroll signed with the Portland Trail Blazers as a free agent on November 7, 2003, and appeared in 13 games for Portland during the 2003–04 season and averaged 1.0 points. He was released by the Trail Blazers on January 7, 2004.

=== Roanoke Dazzle ===
After being cut by the Blazers in the 2003–04 season, Carroll signed with the Roanoke Dazzle of the NBA Development League. He played 11 games with the Dazzle before signing with the Spurs. Carroll scored 15.5 points and registered 2.8 rebounds a game.

Carroll re-signed with the Roanoke Dazzle on December 11, where he excelled — being named 2004–05 NBADL Most Valuable Player. He led all scorers in the NBADL with 20.1 points in 24 games. He also averaged 2.8 rebounds, 1.6 assists and 1.1 steals in 31.7 minutes. He shot .503 from the field (177–352) and .605 from the three-point line (23–38). Carroll scored an NBADL season-high 43 points against the Florida Flame on February 9 and was named NBADL Player of the Month in January after averaging 22.3 points. After January 1, Carroll led Roanoke to a 14–4 record and first place in the NBADL.

=== San Antonio Spurs ===
Carroll signed with the San Antonio Spurs as a free agent on March 8, 2004, for the remainder of the season. He appeared in three games for San Antonio during the 2003–04 season and averaged 2.0 points.

Carroll played in the 2004 Summer League for the Golden State Warriors. He appeared in six games for Golden State during the preseason and averaged 2.8 points and 1.0 rebounds before being released prior to the regular season and returned to Roanoke Dazzle.

=== Charlotte Bobcats ===
Carroll signed with the expansion Charlotte Bobcats on February 23, 2005 and appeared in 25 games and averaged 9.0 points and 2.4 rebounds in 17.2 minutes. In his first season with the Bobcats, Carroll reached double-figure scoring 12 times and scored a career-high 22 points at Washington on April 17. He also posted six consecutive games with 10-plus points from April 5–16.

Carroll became a free agent in the summer of 2005 and was re-signed by the Bobcats. He played in all but four of the Bobcats games in 2005–06, averaging 7.6 pts and two rebounds in 16 minutes per game. The team picked up his option for the 2006–07 season. Carroll gained some media attention after completing five four-point plays during the regular season. The record for four-point plays in one NBA season stands at six, and belongs to Mitch Richmond.

In 2006–07, Carroll had his best NBA season by far, averaging 12.1 ppg, 2.9 rpg, and 1.3 apg. He also led the Bobcats in free throw percentage, shooting .904 from the line, as well as three-point percentage, shooting .416 from beyond the arc.

On July 17, 2007, Matt Carroll re-signed with the Bobcats. Bobcats executive vice president of basketball operations Bernie Bickerstaff had the following comments: "Matt was one of our off-season priorities and we are glad to have him back. [...] He has proven to be the consummate professional on and off the court, and his production has continued to increase since he joined us from the D-League over two years ago."

=== Dallas Mavericks ===
On January 16, 2009, Carroll was traded to the Dallas Mavericks along with Ryan Hollins in exchange for DeSagana Diop.

=== Second stint with the Bobcats ===
On July 13, 2010, Carroll was traded back to the Charlotte Bobcats along with Erick Dampier and Eduardo Nájera in exchange for Tyson Chandler and Alexis Ajinça.

=== New Orleans Hornets ===
On November 13, 2012, Carroll was traded by the Bobcats to the New Orleans Hornets in exchange for Hakim Warrick. He was waived by the Hornets on November 20, 2012 before ever playing a game for them.

Carroll only played one game during the 2012 - 2013 season and that game ended up being the final one of his NBA career. That game took place on November 3, 2012 where the Bobcats suffered a 25-point loss to Carroll's former team, the Dallas Mavericks (99 - 124). In his final game, Carroll played for nearly six minutes, substituting at the very end of the fourth quarter for Ramon Sessions and only recorded 1 assist and 1 foul as a statistic.

== Post-playing career ==
On March 18, 2014, Carroll was named the Charlotte Hornets' Community Ambassador.

== Personal life ==
His brother, Pat, starred at Saint Joseph's University.

== NBA career statistics ==
Legend
GP	Games played	GS	Games started	MPG	Minutes per game
FG%	Field goal percentage	3P%	3-point field goal percentage	FT%	Free throw percentage
RPG	Rebounds per game	APG	Assists per game	SPG	Steals per game
BPG	Blocks per game	PPG	Points per game	**Bold**	Career high

=== Regular season ===
Year	Team	GP	GS	MPG	FG%	3P%	FT%	RPG	APG	SPG	BPG	PPG
2003–04	Portland	13	0	3.7	**.455**	.333	**1.000**	.2	.1	.0	.0	1.0
2003–04	San Antonio	3	0	7.3	.400	—	.500	1.0	.3	.3	.0	2.0
2004–05	Charlotte	25	0	17.2	.389	.333	.855	2.4	.7	**.7**	.1	9.0
2005–06	Charlotte	78	6	16.3	.403	.389	.821	2.0	.4	.6	.1	7.6
2006–07	Charlotte	72	**47**	**26.1**	.433	.416	.904	**2.9**	**1.3**	**.7**	.1	**12.1**
2007–08	Charlotte	**80**	18	25.2	.428	**.436**	.804	2.8	.9	.6	**.2**	9.0
2008–09	Charlotte	34	10	14.0	.406	.267	.789	1.6	.7	.5	**.2**	4.1
2008–09	Dallas	21	0	6.7	.273	.125	**1.000**	.7	.1	.1	.1	1.2
2009–10	Dallas	25	0	4.8	.360	.211	**1.000**	.5	.2	.2	.0	1.8
2010–11	Charlotte	54	1	10.8	.447	.370	.769	1.3	.4	.3	.1	4.4
2011–12	Charlotte	53	2	11.2	.331	.186	.789	1.1	.7	.3	.1	2.7
2012–13	Charlotte	1	0	6.0	—	—	—	.0	1.0	.0	.0	.0
Career		459	84	16.5	.413	.384	.841	1.9	.7	.5	.1	6.6

=== Playoffs ===
Year	Team	GP	GS	MPG	FG%	3P%	FT%	RPG	APG	SPG	BPG	PPG
2009	Dallas	**4**	0	3.5	.500	—	—	.5	.0	.0	.0	.5
2010	Dallas	1	0	**5.0**	**1.000**	—	—	**1.0**	.0	.0	.0	**2.0**
Career		5	0	3.6	.667	.000	.000	.6	.0	.0	.0	.8
