= Eugene McGill =

American politician

Eugene F. McGill

Member of the Pennsylvania House of Representatives from the 151st district
- In office January 3, 1995 – November 30, 2006
- Preceded by: George E. Sauerman
- Succeeded by: Rick Taylor

Personal details
- Born: February 9, 1956 (age 70) Philadelphia, Pennsylvania
- Party: Republican
- Education: Penn State University
- Occupation: Legislator/Manufacturers Representative

Eugene F. McGill is a former Republican member of the Pennsylvania House of Representatives.

== Biography ==
McGill graduated from the Roman Catholic High School for Boys in Philadelphia, Pennsylvania. He earned a degree in communications from Pennsylvania State University in 1980.

Since 1984, he has worked as a manufacturer's representative the Mutimer Company of Plymouth Meeting, Pennsylvania.

He has served on a variety of municipal boards and authorities, beginning with the Ambler Borough Ad Hoc Committee on Solid Waste in 1983. In 1984, he began a two-year term on Ambler Borough Council.

He served on the Horsham Township Sanitary Board from 1986 to 1988 and the Horsham Zoning Hearing Board from 1987 to 1989.

In 1989, he was elected Horsham Township Council in 1989, a position he held until his election to represent the 151st legislative district in the Pennsylvania House of Representatives in 1994.
