= Todd Stephens (politician) =

American politician

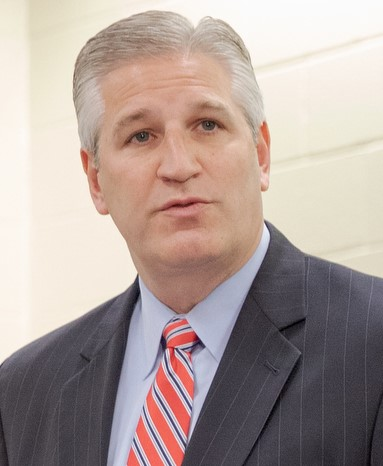

Member of the Pennsylvania House of Representatives from the 151st district
- In office January 4, 2011 – January 3, 2023
- Preceded by: Rick Taylor
- Succeeded by: Melissa Cerrato

Personal details
- Born: William Todd Stephens Horsham, Pennsylvania, U.S.
- Party: Republican
- Spouse: Nicole Kennedy Stephens
- Children: 2
- Education: Shippensburg University (BA); Widener University (JD)
- Website: www.reptoddstephens.com

William Todd Stephens is an American politician who served as a Republican member of the Pennsylvania House of Representatives, representing the 151st District from his election in 2010, until he lost re-election to Democrat Melissa Cerrato in 2022.

== Early life and education ==
After graduating from Hatboro-Horsham High School in 1989, Stephens attended Shippensburg University, where he earned a bachelor's degree in Government and served in student government. Upon completion of his undergraduate studies, he worked briefly as an insurance agent before becoming a clerk in the Montgomery County Prothonotary's Office. Stephens eventually became the Second Deputy Prothonotary.

In addition to working full-time in the Prothonotary's Office, he worked two part-time jobs and attended Widener University School of Law in the evening. In 2000, Stephens graduated from Widener, was admitted to the bar and began his legal career as an Assistant District Attorney in the Pre-Trials Division of the Montgomery County District Attorney's Office. In 2001, he was promoted to the Trials Division and assigned to the Sex Crimes Unit, where he prosecuted crimes against children.

== Assistant United States Attorney ==
In 2004, Stephens was appointed Special Assistant United States Attorney. During his tenure with the U.S. Attorney's Office, Stephens was assigned to the Firearms Unit where he prosecuted individuals who violated federal gun law.

Stephens served as the Captain of the Sex Crimes Unit, the C.L.E.A.N. Team, the Firearms Unit, and the Major Crimes Unit. Upon his resignation in July 2010, he achieved a 99 percent conviction rate as a prosecutor with more than 1500 convictions, and 18 homicide convictions.

== Political career ==
In 2008, Stephens challenged Democratic state Representative Rick Taylor, for a seat in the Pennsylvania House of Representatives, but lost in a hotly contested election.

On November 2, 2010, Stephens defeated Taylor in a rematch of their 2008 race, garnering 53.05 percent of the votes to win the 151st district's seat in the Pennsylvania House of Representatives.

On January 4, 2011, he was sworn in as State Representative and began his first term in Harrisburg. Stephens was re-elected to his sixth term on November 3, 2020.

Stephens currently sits on the Children & Youth, Committee On Ethics, Consumer Affairs, Government Oversight, Judiciary, and Transportation committees.

In 2022, redistricting made his district more Democratic leaning. In the November election that year, Democratic nominee Melissa Cerrato defeated him by 58 votes.
