= Pat Carroll (basketball) =

American basketball player (born 1982)

Personal information
- Born: September 10, 1982 (age 44) Pittsburgh, Pennsylvania, U.S.
- Listed height: 6 ft 5 in (1.96 m)
- Listed weight: 190 lb (86 kg)

Career information
- High school: Hatboro-Horsham (Horsham, Pennsylvania)
- College: Saint Joseph's (2001–2005)
- NBA draft: 2005: undrafted
- Playing career: 2005–2010
- Position: Shooting guard

Career history
- 2006–2007: BCM Gravelines
- 2007–2008: Cajasol Sevilla
- 2008: Lucentum Alicante
- 2008: Rosalía de Castro
- 2008–2009: Tenerife CB
- 2009–2010: Iowa Energy
- 2010: Ikaros

Career highlights
- Atlantic 10 co-Player of the Year (2005); Robert V. Geasey Trophy (2005); First-team All-Atlantic 10 (2005)

Pat Carroll (born September 10, 1982) is an American former professional basketball player. He is a shooting guard who was a three-point specialist.

== Biography ==
Carroll is 6 feet 5 inches (1.96 m) tall and weighs 190 pounds (86 kg). He played high school basketball at Hatboro-Horsham High School in Horsham, Pennsylvania under coach Walt Ostrowski. He played college basketball at the Saint Joseph's University for Phil Martelli and played with Chris Michaels and future National Basketball Association players Jameer Nelson, Delonte West and Dwayne Jones, being an integral part of Saint Joe's NCAA Elite Eight run in the 2003–2004 season, his junior year.

He began Carroll Camps with his brother, Matt, who starred at the University of Notre Dame and played in the NBA, and his grandfather, legendary Pennsylvania high school coach Don Graham. The camps run by the brothers teach the fundamentals of basketball, specifically shooting.

Like his brother, Carroll went undrafted out of college. He played in Europe after going unsigned by an NBA team. After injuring his shoulder in a game in Italy in 2005, Carroll returned to the U.S. to undergo surgery and rehabilitate, missing the entire season.

On July 2, 2006, The Philadelphia Inquirer reported that the Houston Rockets had invited Carroll to play on its summer league team in Las Vegas from July 6–14. On August 17, 2006, Carroll signed a contract with the Dallas Mavericks but was waived October 15 before the 2006–07 season started. He would spend that season with France's BCM Gravelines.

Pat also played for the Iowa Energy in the NBA D-League.

== Personal life ==
Carroll's father John played football at Penn State University. His grandfather coached basketball at Pittsburgh's North Catholic High School and is the winningest coach in Pennsylvania history.
