= Rick Taylor =

American politician

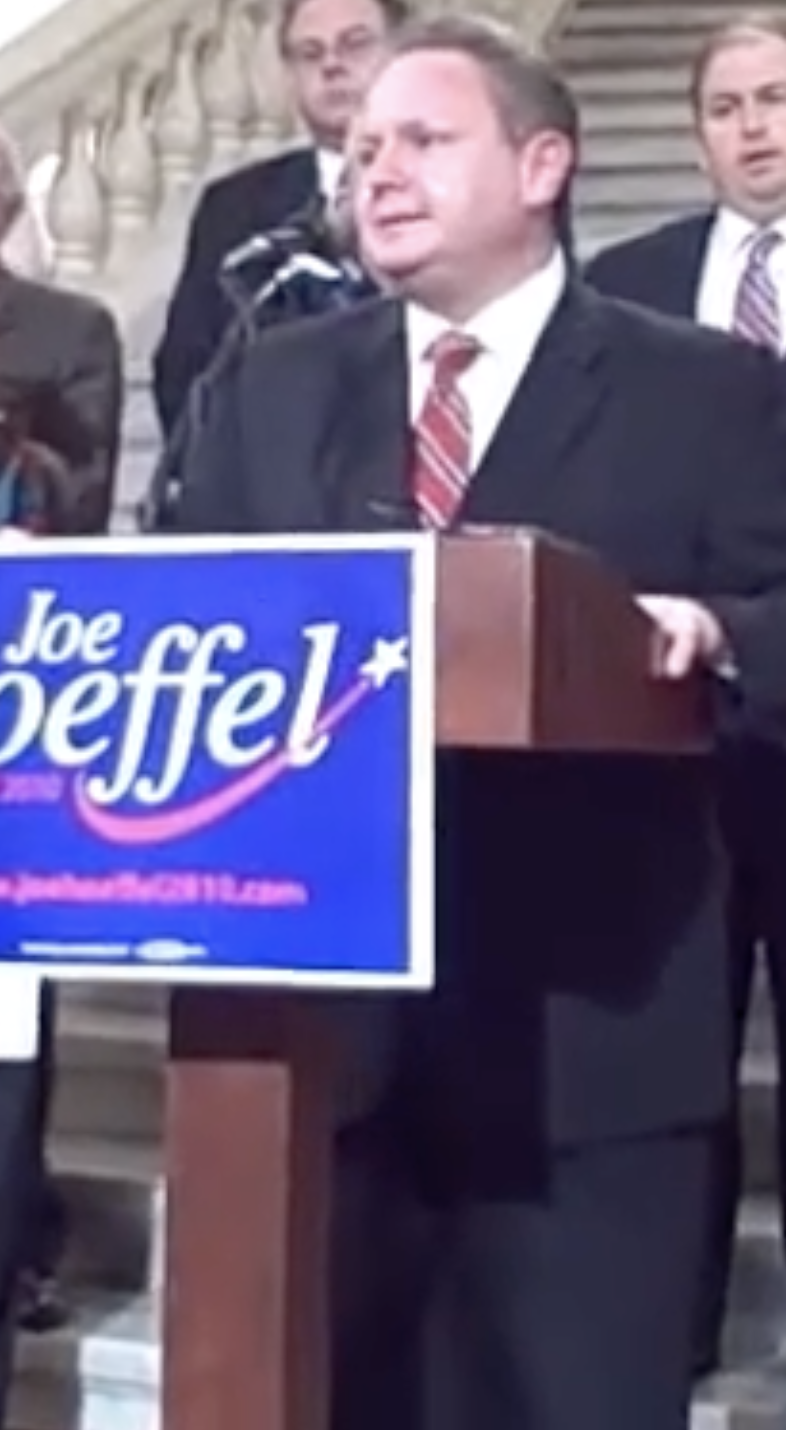

Member of the Pennsylvania House of Representatives from the 151st district
- In office January 2, 2007 – November 30, 2010
- Preceded by: Eugene McGill
- Succeeded by: Todd Stephens

Personal details
- Born: 1969 (age 56–57) South Bend, Indiana, U.S.
- Party: Democratic
- Spouse: Jeanne Sorg
- Children: 2
- Education: Cornell University; University of Minnesota, Lakewood Community College

Rick Taylor (born 1969) is a former Democratic member of the Pennsylvania House of Representatives for the 151st legislative district. He was elected in 2006. Taylor attended University of Minnesota and interned for Minnesota House of Representatives and with Paul Wellstone. He earned a master's degree in Industrial and Labor Relations from Cornell University and worked as Manager of Compensation for IMS Health. He served as a member of the Ambler, Pennsylvania Borough Council prior to his election in 2006, when he defeated incumbent Eugene McGill. He lost re-election in 2010 to Republican Todd Stephens. His wife Jeanne Sorg is the current mayor of Ambler, Pennsylvania.

== Recent Legislation ==
Taylor sponsored a bill that would expand the number of businesses covered under the Small Business First Program. The bill would increase the number of businesses that receive funding; under current legislation, only businesses with fewer than 100 employees are eligible for aid. The legislation will help more small businesses to prosper and grow.

On June 8, 2010 Rick Taylor sponsored H.B. 1926, which requires all homeless sex offenders to register in their local "hang outs." The bill corrects a previous loophole in Megan's Law, in which homeless sex offenders would fail to register because they lacked a permanent residence.

Taylor co-sponsored legislation to help prevent previously unaddressed forms of school bullying, including "cyber bullying" and harassment. The bill gives guidelines to each school's administration to deal with these incidents; also, the Department of Education is required to regularly evaluate each school's bullying policy and report back to the General Assembly. School districts that fail to comply with these regulations risk losing their Safe School funding from the state of Pennsylvania.
