= Pennsylvania House of Representatives, District 151 =

American legislative district

Pennsylvania's 151st State House of Representatives district
Representative
Melissa Cerrato; D–Horsham Township

The 151st Pennsylvania House of Representatives District is located in southeastern Pennsylvania and has been represented by Democrat Melissa Cerrato since 2023.

== District profile ==
The 151st District is based in Montgomery County and includes the following areas:

- Ambler
- Horsham Township
- Montgomery Township (part)
  - District 04
  - District 05
  - District 06
  - District 07
  - District 08
- Upper Dublin Township (part)
  - District 01 (part)
    - Division 02
  - District 02 (part)
    - Division 03
  - District 03
  - District 06
  - District 07

== Representatives ==
Representative	Party	Years	District home	Note
Prior to 1969, seats were apportioned by county.
Charles H. Dager	Republican	1969 – 1974		
Vern Pyles	Republican	1975 – 1980		
George Saurman	Republican	1981 – 1994		
Eugene McGill	Republican	1995 – 2006	Horsham Township	
Rick Taylor	Democrat	2007 – 2010	Ambler	
Todd Stephens	Republican	2011 – 2022		Defeated in general election
Melissa Cerrato	Democratic	2023 – present	Horsham Township	Incumbent

== Recent election results ==
PA House election, 2022: Pennsylvania House, District 151
Party	Candidate	Votes	%
Democratic	Melissa Cerrato	16,805	50.09
Republican	Todd Stephens (incumbent)	16,742	49.91
Total votes		33,547	100.00
Democratic gain from Republican			

PA House election, 2020: Pennsylvania House, District 151
Party	Candidate	Votes	%
Republican	Todd Stephens (incumbent)	21,074	53.11
Democratic	Jonathan Kassa	18,604	46.89
Total votes		39,678	100.00
Republican hold			

PA House election, 2018: Pennsylvania House, District 151
Party	Candidate	Votes	%
Republican	Todd Stephens (incumbent)	15,340	51.49
Democratic	Sara Johnson Rothman	14,451	48.51
Total votes		29,791	100.00
Republican hold			

PA House election, 2016: Pennsylvania House, District 151
Party	Candidate	Votes	%
Republican	Todd Stephens (incumbent)	20,358	60.81
Democratic	Jimmy Fagan, Jr.	13,119	39.19
Total votes		33,477	100.00
Republican hold			

PA House election, 2014: Pennsylvania House, District 151
Party	Candidate	Votes	%
Republican	Todd Stephens (incumbent)	Unopposed	
Total votes		13,541	100.00
Republican hold			

PA House election, 2012: Pennsylvania House, District 151
Party	Candidate	Votes	%
Republican	Todd Stephens (incumbent)	19,153	59.17
Democratic	Will Sylianteng	13,217	40.83
Total votes		32,370	100.00
Republican hold			

PA House election, 2010: Pennsylvania House, District 151
Party	Candidate	Votes	%
Republican	Todd Stephens	12,398	53.04
Democratic	Rick Taylor (incumbent)	10,979	46.96
Total votes		23,377	100.00
Republican gain from Democratic			
