= Benjamin Obdyke =

Coordinates: 40.20135°N 75.16943°W

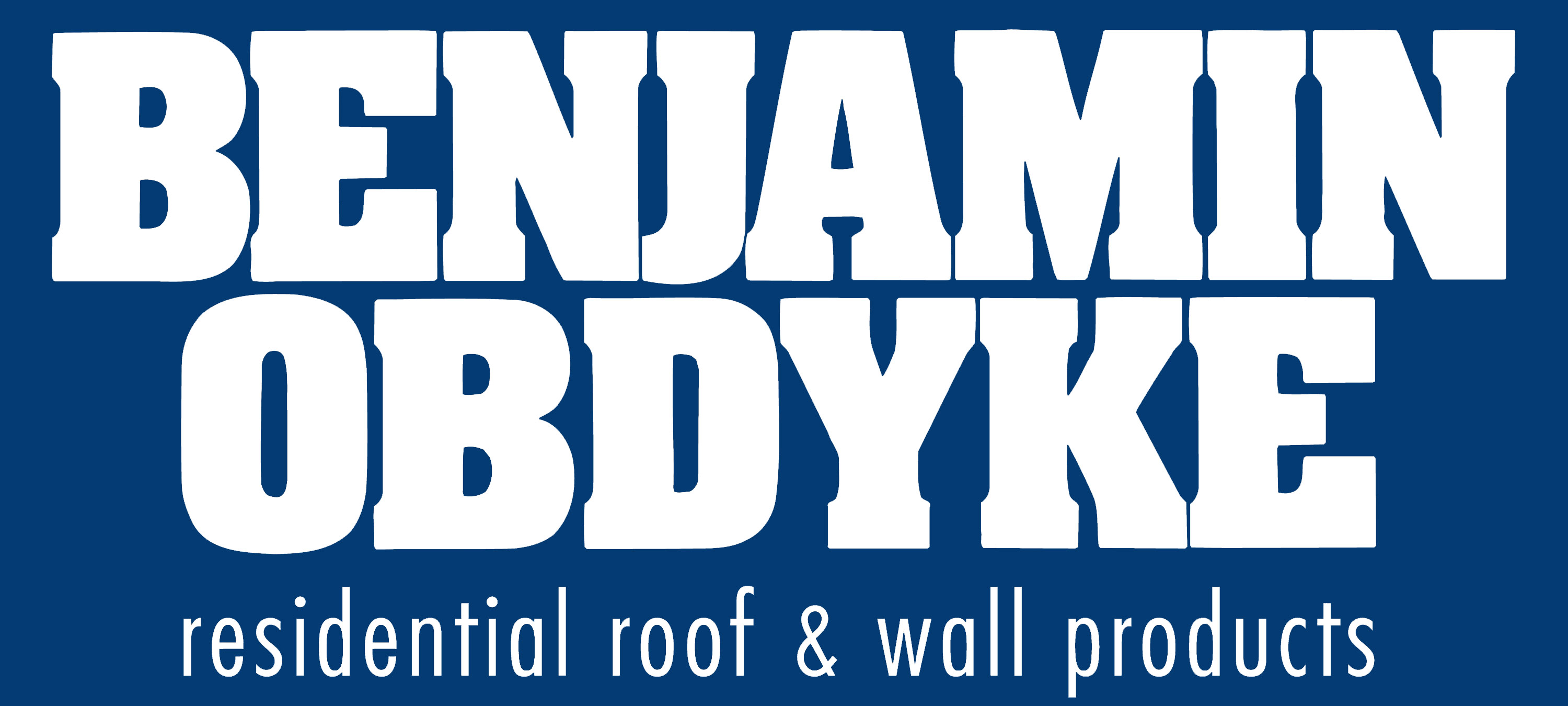
Benjamin Obdyke Corporate Logo

Benjamin Obdyke Incorporated is a building materials manufacturer based in the Philadelphia suburb of Horsham, Pennsylvania. The company was started by its namesake, Benjamin P. Obdyke in 1868. Benjamin P. Obdyke is credited with creating and manufacturing the first corrugated downspout while the company itself claims patents on three products that have been integral in the advancement of building practices over the past 20 years: Roll Vent the first rolled ridge vent, Cedar Breather the first wood roofing underlayment, and Home Slicker the first rolled product to provide drainage and air flow in rainscreen wall assemblies. While the company’s origins are closely tied to the metal gutters and downspouts business, Benjamin Obdyke sold off that part of their business in the late nineties and now exclusively sells roof and wall products that help improve the building envelope, most of which feature the company’s patented matrix technology.

== History ==
Benjamin Obdyke Incorporated was started in Philadelphia, Pennsylvania in 1868 by Benjamin P. Obdyke after he returned from serving the Union Army in the American Civil War. Obdyke invented and patented the round corrugated downspout, beginning a long tradition of manufacturing innovative quality building products. The company and product line grew over the years to include a variety of rain carrying equipment, roof edging and trims. The manufacturing process included roll formers and various stamping dies. The products were manufactured from Galvanized steel, copper and later aluminum (both pre painted and mill finish). By 1997 the company was operating 26 roll formers in a 200,000 sq. ft. manufacturing and distribution facility located in Warminster, Pennsylvania. In 1988 BOI acquired the patent for a rolled ridge vent, which began a new era of innovative products such as Roll Vent, Rapid Ridge, Cedar Breather, and eventually Home Slicker.

In the late nineties the company was approached by another old line gutter manufacturer, Berger Brothers located in Feasterville, Pennsylvania with interest to acquire the metal manufacturing portion of the business. Based on the growth of the newer innovative products, the company decided to sell the metal business to Berger and did so in December 1997. Today, the company actively markets its ridge ventilation and moisture management products under the Benjamin Obdyke brand to professional contractors all over North America through their diverse network of wholesale distributors.
