= Vern Pyles =

American politician (1919–2013)

Member of the Pennsylvania House of Representatives from the 151st district
- In office January 7, 1975 – November 30, 1980
- Preceded by: Charles Dager
- Succeeded by: George Sauerman

Personal details
- Born: May 17, 1919 Washington, D.C., United States
- Died: June 20, 2013 (aged 94) Lansdale, Pennsylvania
- Party: Republican

Lavern "Vern" Pyles, Jr. (May 17, 1919 – June 20, 2013) was a Republican member of the Pennsylvania House of Representatives.

Born in Washington, D.C., he worked as a cable slicer for AT&T and then went to Clemson University where he received his degree in civil engineering. He served in the United States Navy during World War II and then served in the Navy Civil Engineer Corps. After his retirement from the United States Navy in 1967, he worked as a civil engineer in Pennsylvania before retiring in 1982. He died in Lansdale, Pennsylvania.
