= Melissa Cerrato =

American politician

Member of the Pennsylvania House of Representatives from the 151st district
- Incumbent
- Assumed office January 3, 2023
- Preceded by: Todd Stephens

Personal details
- Party: Democratic
- Website: Official website

Melissa Cerrato is a member of the Pennsylvania House of Representatives from the 151st district. She won her race in 2022 by 58 votes and was sworn in on January 3, 2023.

== Biography ==
Cerrato's sister is Anne Caprara, the chief of staff to Illinois Governor J. B. Pritzker.

Cerrato focused her 2022 campaign on reproductive rights, funding public schools, sensible gun legislation, affordable living, and government accountability. Her win was pivotal in flipping the Pennsylvania House to the Democrats for the first time in twelve years.

2022 Pennsylvania House of Representatives election, 151st district
Party	Candidate	Votes	%	±%
Democratic	Melissa Cerrato	16,799	50.1%	
Republican	Todd Stephens (incumbent)	16,741	49.9%	
