= Charles Dager =

American politician (1927–2016)

Charles H. Dager

Member of the Pennsylvania House of Representatives from the 151st district
- In office January 7, 1969 – November 30, 1974
- Preceded by: District Created
- Succeeded by: Vern Pyles

Member of the Pennsylvania House of Representatives from the Montgomery County district
- In office January 2, 1967 – November 30, 1968

Personal details
- Born: May 10, 1927 Ambler, Pennsylvania, United States
- Died: January 26, 2016 (aged 88) Abington Township, Montgomery County, Pennsylvania, United States
- Party: Republican

Charles H. Dager (May 10, 1927 – January 26, 2016) is a former Republican member of the Pennsylvania House of Representatives.
