= George Saurman =

American politician (1926–2022)

George E. Saurman

Member of the Pennsylvania House of Representatives from the 151st district
- In office 1981–1994
- Preceded by: Vern Pyles
- Succeeded by: Eugene McGill

Personal details
- Born: January 15, 1926 Houston, Texas
- Died: October 3, 2022 (aged 96) Fort Washington, Pennsylvania
- Party: Republican

George E. Saurman (January 15, 1926 – October 3, 2022) was a Republican member of the Pennsylvania House of Representatives from 1981 to 1994.

He also self-published three books with iUniverse.
