= Hatboro-Horsham School District =

School district in Pennsylvania, United States

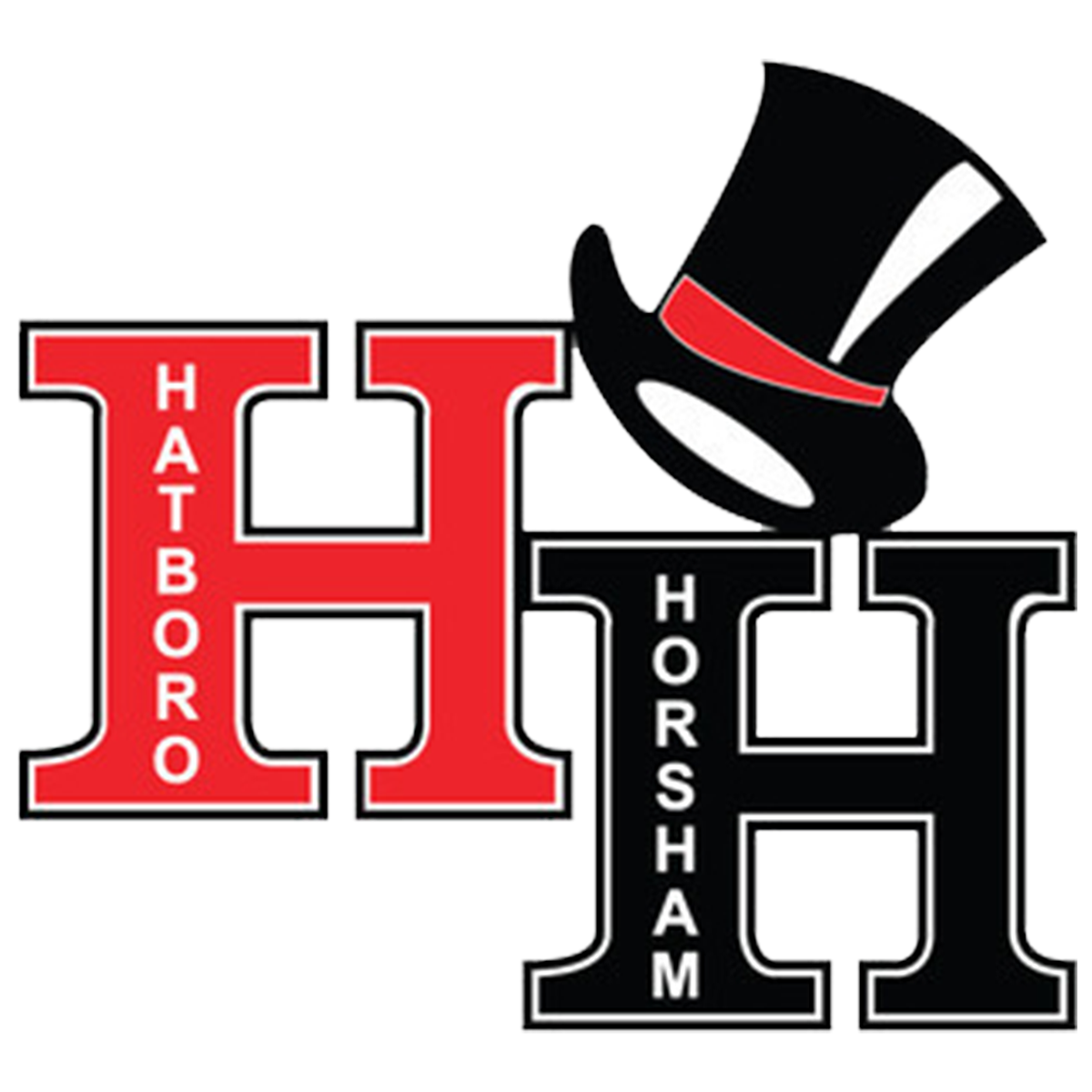

Address
- 229 Meetinghouse Road Horsham, Pennsylvania, 19044; United States

District information
- Type: Public
- Grades: K–12
- Established: 1966
- NCES District ID: 4211610

Students and staff
- Students: 4,276 (2023–2024)
- Teachers: 393.03 (on an FTE basis)
- Staff: 374.0 (on an FTE basis)
- Student–teacher ratio: 10.88:1
- District mascot: Hat, Mad Hatter
- Colors: Red and Black

Other information
- Website: www.hatboro-horsham.org

The Hatboro-Horsham School District is located in Montgomery County in the U.S. state of Pennsylvania. It is a suburban Philadelphia school district of approximately 4800 students. The district operates four elementary schools (K-5), one Middle School (6–8) and one high school (9–12) in Horsham Township and the borough of Hatboro. In total, the district operates 6 schools.

The superintendent is Dr. Scott Eveslage. The assistant superintendent is Dr. Ted Domers.

== Schools ==
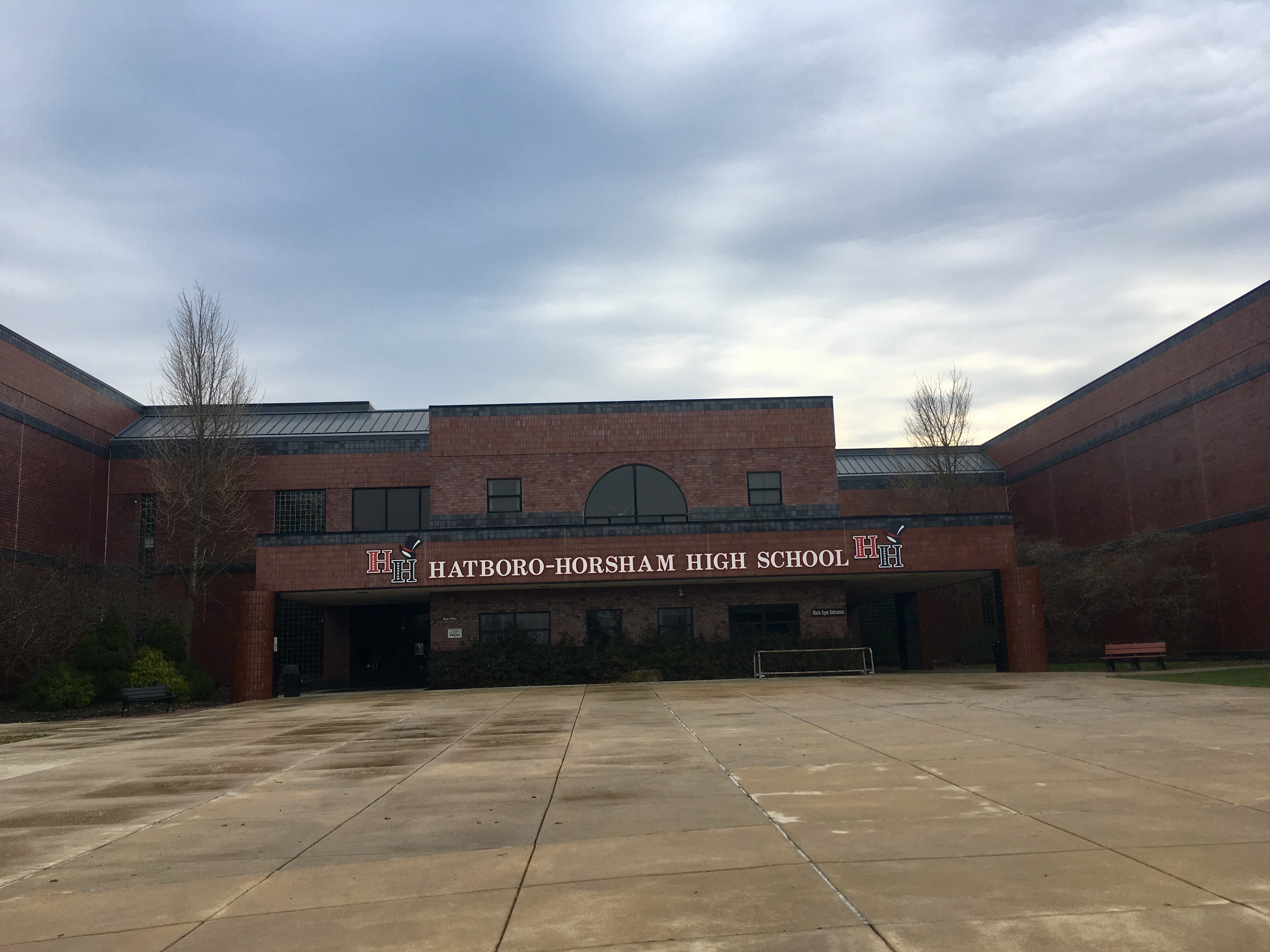
Hatboro-Horsham High School

| Name | Website | Grades |
|---|---|---|
| Hatboro-Horsham High School | link | 9–12 |
| Keith Valley Middle School | link | 6-8 |
| Blair Mill Elementary School | link | K-5 |
| Crooked Billet Elementary School | link | K-5 |
| Hallowell Elementary School | link | K-5 |
| Simmons Elementary School | link | K-5 |

Note: Based on the District website October 2025.
