= Horsham, Pennsylvania =

Unincorporated community in Pennsylvania, US

- Census-designated place
- Location within Pennsylvania Location within the United States
- Coordinates: 40°10′34.20″N 75°08′2.40″W
- Country: United States
- State: Pennsylvania
- County: Montgomery
- Township: Horsham
- Settled: 1682

Area
  - Total: 5.47 sq mi (14.17 km^{2})
  - Land: 5.47 sq mi (14.17 km^{2})
  - Water: 0 sq mi (0.00 km^{2})
- Elevation: 249 ft (76 m)

Population (2020)
  - Total: 15,193
  - Density: 2,778/sq mi (1,072.4/km^{2})
- Time zone: UTC-5 (Eastern (EST))
  - Summer (DST): UTC-4 (EDT)
- ZIP code: 19044
- Area codes: 215, 267, and 445
- GNIS feature ID: 1177472

Horsham is a census-designated place in Horsham Township, Montgomery County, Pennsylvania, United States. The population was 15,193 at the 2020 census. It is home to the Biddle Air National Guard Base at the former site of Naval Air Station Joint Reserve Base Willow Grove, as well as the headquarters of Music Choice, a cable music provider.

Horsham shares the same boundaries as the ZIP Code 19044. It covers an area of 5.47 miles and is located 16 miles (26 km) north of Philadelphia.

== Geography ==
Horsham is located at 40°10′34.20″N 75°08′2.40″W (40.178484, -75.128786).

== Climate ==
The climate in Horsham is characterized by hot, humid summers and generally cool to cold winters. According to the Köppen Climate Classification system, Horsham has a humid continental climate, abbreviated "Dfa" on climate maps.

== Demographics ==
Historical population
Census	Pop.	Note	%±
1990	15,051		—
2000	14,779		−1.8%
2010	14,842		0.4%
2020	15,193		2.4%

=== 2020 census ===
As of the 2020 census, Horsham had a population of 15,193. The median age was 40.1 years. 20.9% of residents were under the age of 18 and 15.7% of residents were 65 years of age or older. For every 100 females there were 93.1 males, and for every 100 females age 18 and over there were 90.7 males age 18 and over.

100.0% of residents lived in urban areas, while 0.0% lived in rural areas.

There were 6,010 households in Horsham, of which 29.6% had children under the age of 18 living in them. Of all households, 49.2% were married-couple households, 16.8% were households with a male householder and no spouse or partner present, and 26.6% were households with a female householder and no spouse or partner present. About 27.6% of all households were made up of individuals and 10.2% had someone living alone who was 65 years of age or older.

There were 6,221 housing units, of which 3.4% were vacant. The homeowner vacancy rate was 0.9% and the rental vacancy rate was 3.9%.

Racial composition as of the 2020 census
Race	Number	Percent
White	12,118	79.8%
Black or African American	757	5.0%
American Indian and Alaska Native	29	0.2%
Asian	866	5.7%
Native Hawaiian and Other Pacific Islander	3	0.0%
Some other race	490	3.2%
Two or more races	930	6.1%
Hispanic or Latino (of any race)	1,104	7.3%

=== Demographic estimates ===
The population density was 2,777.5 inhabitants per square mile (1,072.4/km^{2}).

=== Income and poverty ===
The median income for a household in the CDP was $85,767, and the median income for a family was $68,619. The per capita income for the CDP was $41,747. About 39.8% of the population were below the poverty line.

== Education ==
It is part of the Hatboro-Horsham School District.
