= Selma Mansion =

Historic building in Pennsylvania

Coordinates: 40.12317°N 75.36009°W

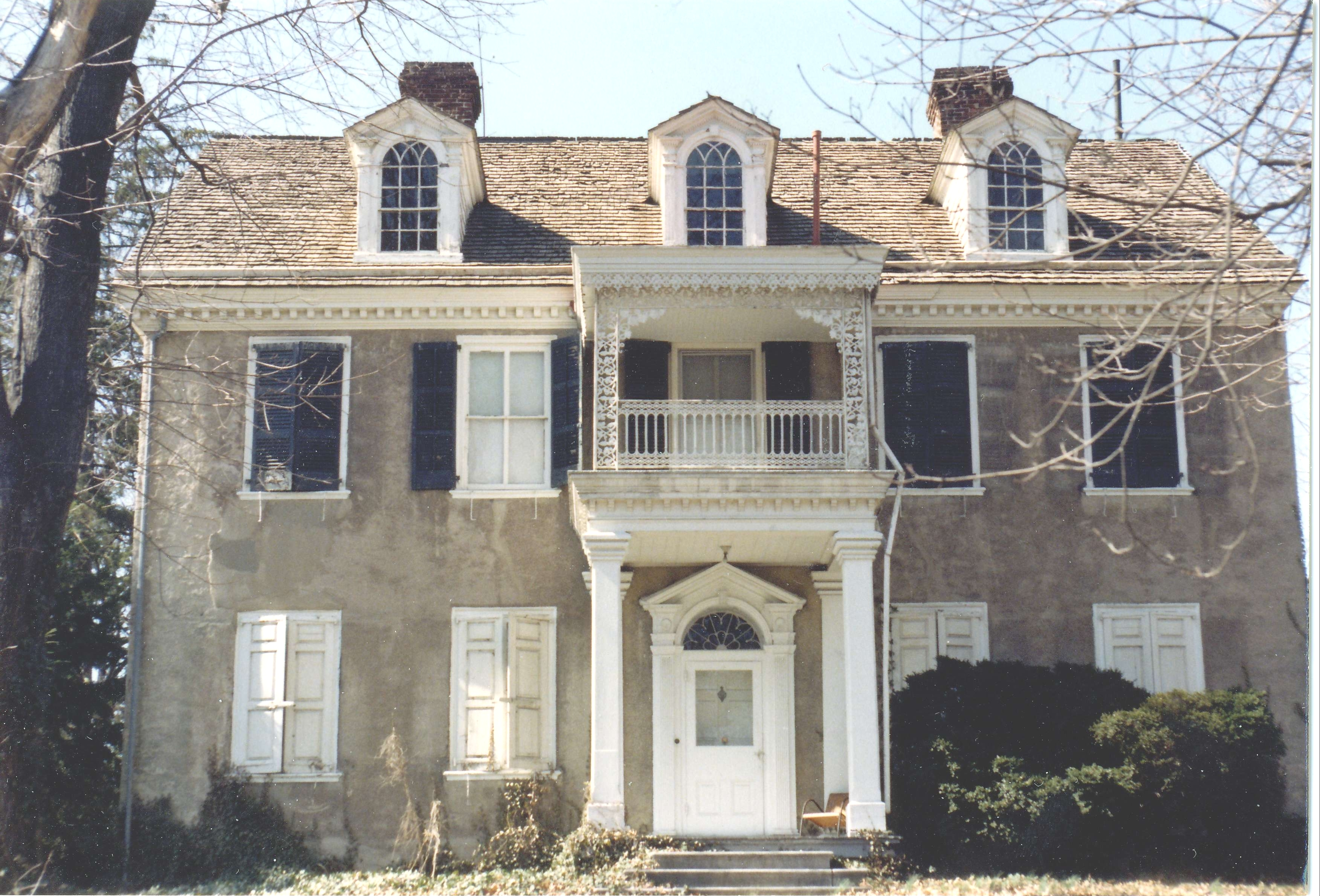

Selma Mansion is one of the oldest structures in Norristown, Pennsylvania. Located on the western edge of the town, Selma was built by General Andrew Porter in 1794 around an existing structure purchased from Alexander McCammon in 1786. Porter was a soldier during the American Revolutionary War and helped found the Continental Marines, forerunner of the U.S. Marine Corps. He was later appointed Surveyor General, helped lay out the borders of the commonwealth and attained the rank of general.

== History ==
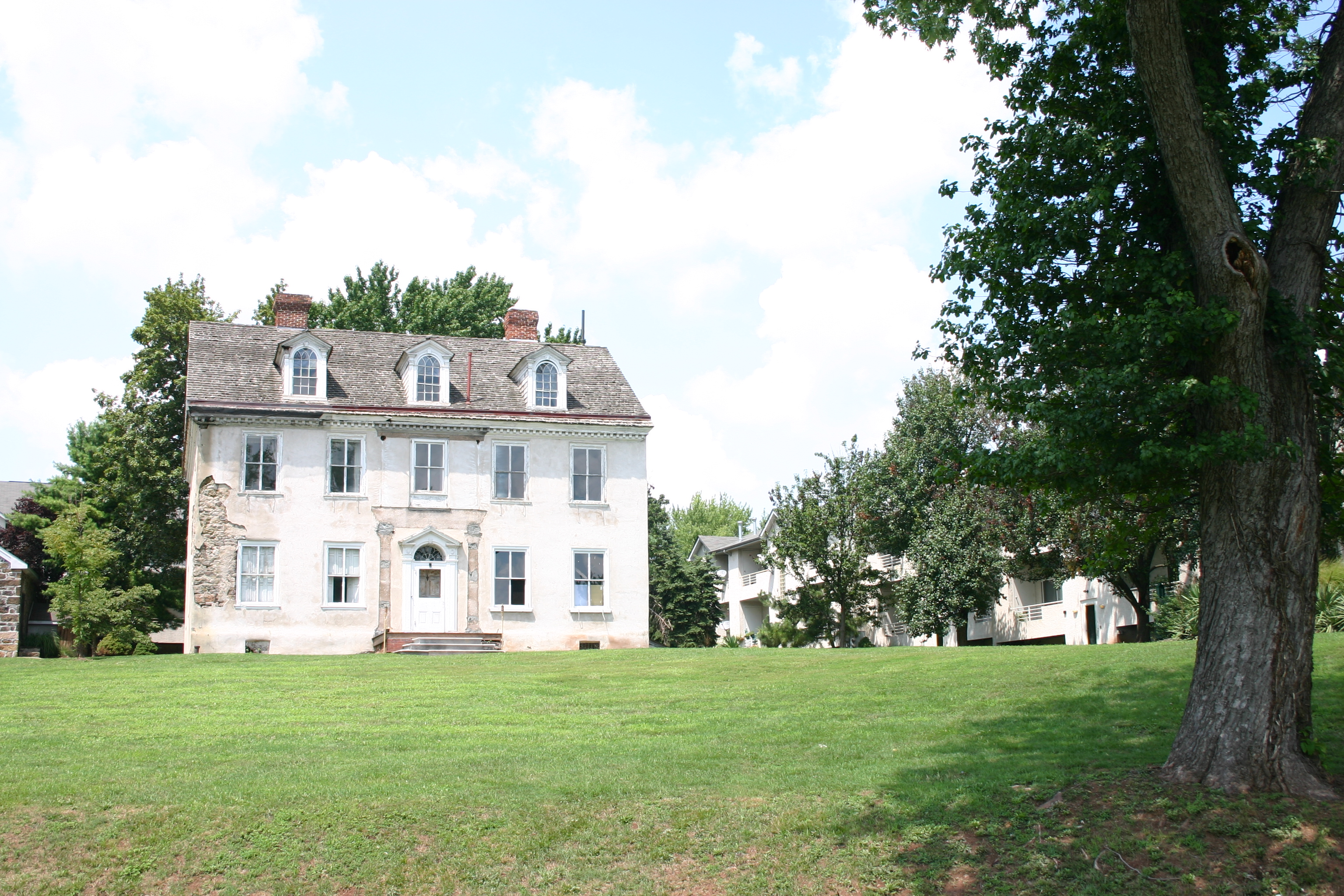

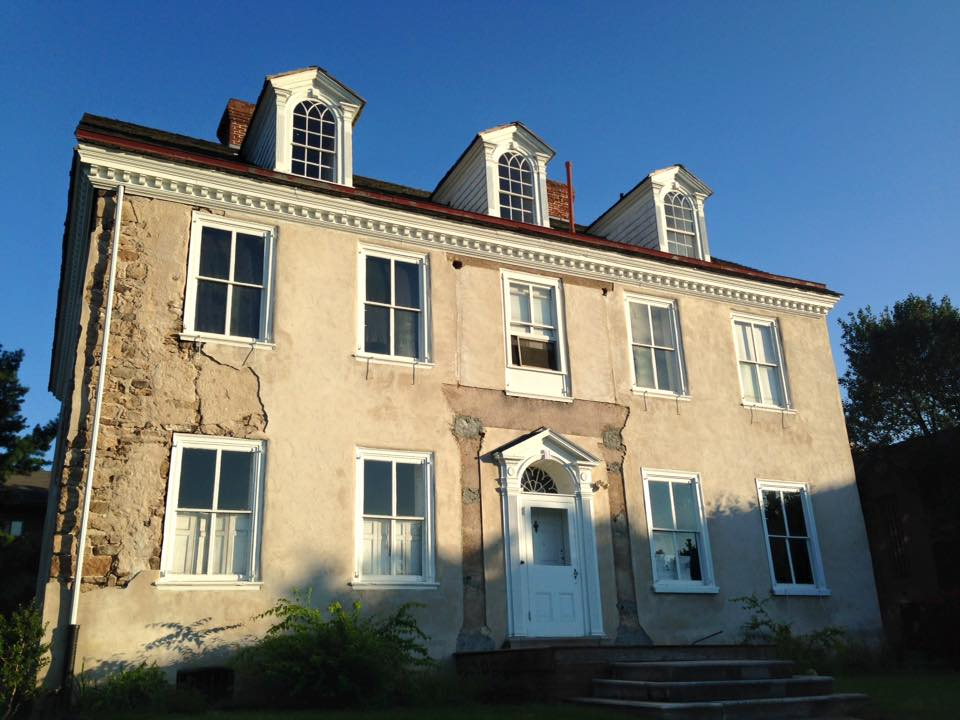
Selma Mansion

Andrew Porter's sons were raised at Selma Mansion and went on to distinguished careers in law, politics, and government. His eldest son, Richard Porter, was president judge of the 3rd judicial district of Pennsylvania. His second son, David Rittenhouse Porter, named for Andrew's friend and neighbor, David Rittenhouse, served as governor of Pennsylvania from 1839 to 1845. His third son, George Bryan Porter, was appointed governor of Michigan Territory by President Andrew Jackson. Andrew's youngest son, James Madison Porter, was Secretary of War under President John Tyler and a founder of Lafayette College in Easton.

Porter's grandson, Civil War brevet brigadier general Horace Porter, was the aide-de-camp and personal secretary to Ulysses S. Grant, and was ambassador to France from 1897 to 1905, while his granddaughter Eliza Parker married Robert Todd and gave birth to a daughter, Mary, the wife of eventual U.S. President Abraham Lincoln.

In 1821 the property was sold to Andrew Knox Jr., who later passed it on to his son Col. Thomas P. Knox, farmer and president of Pennsylvania's agricultural society. Selma later passed into the hands of the Fornance family, whose patriarch, Joseph Fornance, represented Norristown and Montgomery County in the 26th and 27th United States Congress. His son, also Joseph Fornance, lived in the house with his wife Ellen Knox Fornance and their family passing the home on to their son Joseph Knox Fornance and his wife Ruth Ryder Fornance. The mansion remained in the Fornance family until 1982.

The mansion was built in the Federal style, although the interior woodwork and proportions are Colonial or Georgian. The porches are Italianate, having been added in the mid-19th century. A Pennsylvania state historical marker, authorized by the state's Historical and Museum Commission, stands on the site.
