= Andrew Porter =

Andrew or Andy Porter may refer to:

== Academics ==
- Andrew C. Porter (born 1942), American educational psychologist and psychometrician
- Andrew Porter (historian) (born 1945), British historian
- Andrew Porter (music critic) (1928–2015), British music critic and scholar

== Military ==
- Andrew Porter (Civil War general) (1820–1872), American Civil War general
- Andrew Porter (Revolutionary War officer) (1743–1813), American Revolutionary War officer

== Sports ==
- Marshall Porter (1874–1900), Irish sportsman, son of Sir Andrew Porter
- Andrew Porter (baseball) (1910–2010), Negro league baseball player
- Andy Porter (footballer, born 1937), Scottish footballer
- Andy Porter (footballer, born 1968), English footballer and coach
- Andrew Porter (rugby union) (born 1996), Irish rugby player

== Other people ==
- Andrew I. Porter (born 1946), American science fiction editor and publisher
- Andrew J. Porter (born 1972), American short story writer and novelist
- Sir Andrew Porter, 1st Baronet (1837–1919), Irish lawyer, judge, and MP

== See also ==
- Sir Andrew Horsbrugh-Porter, 3rd Baronet (1907–1986), British nobleman
