= George Bryan Porter =

American politician

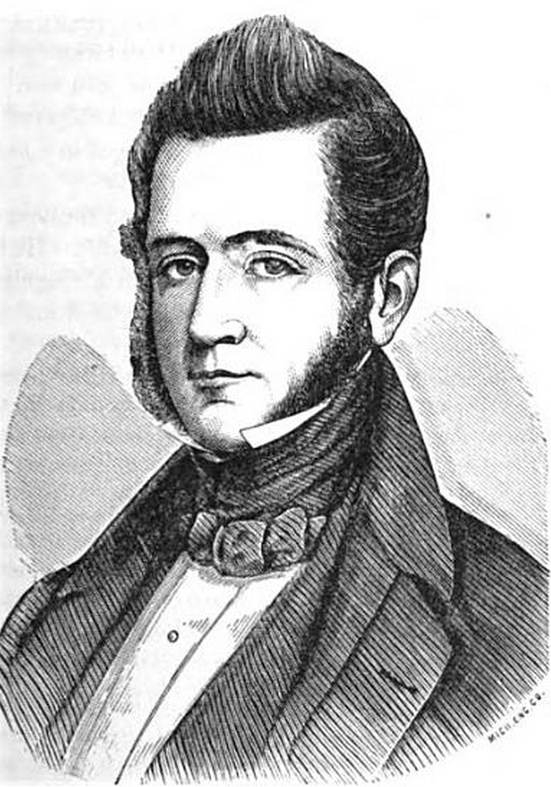

3rd Territorial Governor of Michigan
- In office August 6, 1831 – July 6, 1834
- President: Andrew Jackson
- Preceded by: Lewis Cass
- Succeeded by: Stevens T. Mason

Member of the Pennsylvania House of Representatives
- In office 1827–1827

Personal details
- Born: February 9, 1791 Norristown, Pennsylvania, U.S.
- Died: July 6, 1834 (aged 43) Detroit, Michigan, U.S.
- Resting place: Elmwood Cemetery; Detroit, Michigan
- Party: Democratic party
- Spouse: Sarah Humes Porter
- Relations: David Rittenhouse Porter (b); James Madison Porter (b); Horace Porter (n)
- Children: Andrew Porter
- Parent(s): Andrew Porter; Elizabeth Parker Porter
- Occupation: Attorney; Politician

Military service
- Branch/service: United States Army
- Years of service: 1812
- Rank: Major
- Battles/wars: War of 1812

George Bryan Porter (February 9, 1791 – July 6, 1834) was an American statesman in Pennsylvania and Territorial governor of Michigan from August 6, 1831, until his death on July 6, 1834.

== Early life ==
Born in Norristown, Pennsylvania, Porter attended the Norristown Academy. While he and his two brothers were preparing to enter college, there was a student "rebellion" at Princeton University and many school buildings had been burned. As a result, Porter and his brothers continued their studies in their father's library rather than at Princeton.

== Career ==
Porter was a major in the United States Army during the War of 1812. He attended Litchfield Law School in Litchfield, Connecticut, and was admitted to the bar in Lancaster County, Pennsylvania, in 1813. He served as Prothonotary (Chief Court Clerk) in Lancaster County, Pennsylvania, in 1818.

A lawyer in Lancaster, Lancaster County, Pennsylvania, Porter eventually entered state politics. He served as Adjutant General from 1824 to 1829; became a Democratic party member of the Pennsylvania House of Representatives in 1827.

Porter was United States Marshall for the Eastern District of Pennsylvania in 1831. Appointed by President Andrew Jackson in 1831, Porter served as the Territorial Governor of Michigan from 1832 until his death in 1834. In this role he accompanied Oneida chief Daniel Bread to the White House to ask President Jackson for alternative land arrangements for the Oneida in response to the 1831 Treaty of Washington, which along with the 1927 Treaty of Butte Morts had reduced Oneida lands by 90%. The trip was successful in that the president agreed to exchange Oneida lands for "better, more fertile" lands.

Porter was a chief negotiator of the 1833 Treaty of Chicago.

== Death ==
Porter died while in office on July 6, 1834, during a cholera epidemic in Detroit, Michigan. He is interred at Elmwood Cemetery in Detroit.

A portrait of Porter was unveiled in November 2015 and hangs on the second floor of the Michigan State Capitol in Lansing.

== Family life ==
Porter married Sarah Humes of Pennsylvania on October 31, 1816, and had at least four children, one of whom was General Andrew Porter, one of the generals at the First Battle of Bull Run, who married Margarite Biddle of the famous Biddle family.

Porter was the son of Andrew Porter who served in the U.S. Revolutionary War, and Elizabeth Parker Porter. He was also the brother of David Rittenhouse Porter, Pennsylvania Governor 1839–1845, and James Madison Porter, Secretary of War 1843–1844, and the uncle of Horace Porter, U.S. Ambassador to France 1897–1905.

Political offices
Preceded by Lewis Cass	Territorial Governor of Michigan; 1831–1834	Succeeded by Stevens T. Mason
