= Philadelphia Home Rule Charter reform campaign =

American local campaign

The Philadelphia Home Rule Charter reform campaign is a campaign in Philadelphia, Pennsylvania to rewrite the city's 1951 Home Rule Charter. The campaign began in response to several local political scandals, the most recent being City Council members' participation in DROP, a Deferred Retirement Option Plan originally intended for civil service.

== Home rule in Pennsylvania ==
A home rule municipality in Pennsylvania is one incorporated under its own unique organic charter or constitution, created pursuant to the state's Home Rule and Optional Plans Law and approved by referendum. Local governments without home rule can only act where specifically authorized by state law; home rule municipalities can act anywhere except where they are specifically limited by state law.

=== History of home rule in Pennsylvania ===
Municipal home rule, a political reform of the early 20th-century progressive movement, was introduced in Pennsylvania by a 1922 amendment to the Pennsylvania State Constitution of 1874, but was generally limited to cities, and until Philadelphia, was never used. In 1949, with the City of Philadelphia on the brink of financial collapse, the Pennsylvania General Assembly enacted what is commonly known as the "Lord Home Rule Bill," named after a Pennsylvania state senator who was member of Philadelphia's infamous Republican machine.

In 1968, Pennsylvania enacted a new state constitution which allows any Pennsylvania municipality to adopt a home rule charter or an optional form of government, and in 1972 enacted a uniform Home Rule Act which provides the procedures for municipalities to adopt home rule charters. However, that 1972 Act (re-enacted in 1996) does not apply to Philadelphia, which remains under the 1949 Lord Home Rule Act.

=== History of home rule in Philadelphia ===
Philadelphia became the first municipality in Pennsylvania to enact a home rule charter, approved by the voters on April 17, 1951. Among the reforms was the prohibition of elected city officials running for another office, such as a City Councilman running for mayor, without first resigning his existing office, and creation of a professional managing director.

== Existing home rule reform campaign ==
However, as a result of political unrest caused by repeated financial crisis and political scandals, Philadelphia political activists, from the Tea Party, reform Democrats and "loyal opposition" Republicans, have launched a citywide petition drive to have voters approve a referendum to create a new government study commission that essentially would write a new Home Rule Charter for Philadelphia.

=== DROP ===
In the sixty years since the 1951 Home Rule Charter adoption, Philadelphia has continued to be rocked by multiple political scandals and is in such financial straits as to be under the state version of municipal bankruptcy, its finances governed by the Pennsylvania Intergovernmental Cooperation Authority. PICA was charged with "restoring the financial stability" and "achieving balanced budgets" for Philadelphia.

However, Philadelphia politicians remain embroiled in the extremely unpopular DROP controversy. DROP, short for Deferred Retirement Option Plan, was introduced by then Mayor Edward G. Rendell (later Pennsylvania's governor) to facilitate orderly transition from seasoned civil service employees to their successors. However, City Council elected to include itself. The Philadelphia City Solicitor opined that City Council members and other elected officials could effectively resign for one day, collect their DROP benefits, in many cases, up to $450,000 or more, then return to work the following day. In an appeal in April 2011 of an election dispute to the Pennsylvania Supreme Court, Justice Thomas Saylor, in a blistering dissent, wrote that City Council's “supposed ‘retirements” amount to a mere pretense, or sham, designed solely to obtain the lump-sum DROP benefit involved and then to continue on the same position as before.”

=== Urban blight ===
Philadelphia Mayor Michael Nutter is likewise drawing public ire, by his refusal to comply with the existing Home Rule Charter, in failing to send a proposed out-of-court settlement agreement between the Commonwealth of Pennsylvania, the Attorney General of Pennsylvania, the City of Philadelphia, and The Germantown Conservancy, a 501(c)(3) community development corporation, for appointment of the CDC as the court-appointed conservator under Pennsylvania's Abandoned and Blighted Property Conservatorship Act. Philadelphia has over 40,000 abandoned buildings and vacant lots, costing homeowners $3.6 billion in lost homeowner equity. The Mayor is also refusing to collect a penalty tax levied against slumlords and other abandoned property owners as required by the Philadelphia City Code, losing up to $94.6 million a year.

== City-wide canvass campaign ==
Organizers, which formed the We the People of Philadelphia Committee, are seeking to obtain 30,000 signatures to be filed with election officials on Tuesday, August 9, 2011. A Save Our City canvass will commence from Thursday, July 28 through Saturday, August 6. Sunday, July 31 will be Holy Experiment Sunday, with over 1,000 houses of worship participating. Pastors are to read William Penn's Prayer for Philadelphia, then ask congregants who are registered Philadelphia voters to sign the Government Study Commission ballot question petition.

=== Commonwealth Court proceedings ===
Several of the proponents circulating the Government Study Commission ballot question petition, have filed a Petition for Review in the Pennsylvania Commonwealth Court seeking the Lord Home Rule Bill, enacted in 1949 solely for Philadelphia which while allowing citizens to petition to create a government study commission, the government study commission members are appointed by the mayor and city council president; be declared unconstitutional; because the more recent Pennsylvania State Constitution, enacted in 1968, through a 1972 Act, provides the right for all citizens to vote for candidates for the government study commission. The proponents argue it is unconstitutional to deny a right to elect government study commission members to Philadelphia voters which is granted to all other Pennsylvania voters.
