= TTH =

TTH may refer to:

== Science and technology ==
- Tension-type headache
- Tiger-tree hash, a hash tree using the Tiger hash function

== Other uses ==
- Taylor, Taylor and Hobson, an optics company, later Taylor Hobson
- Team Tvis Holstebro, Danish handball team
- TTh (Tuesdays & Thursdays), a US school scheduling abbreviation
- Tenants to Homeowners (TTH), a community land trust in Douglas County, Kansas
- Thornton Heath railway station (National Rail station code: TTH), London, England
