= Tenants to Homeowners =

Community land trust in Douglas County, KS

- Type: Non-Profit
- Industry: Affordable housing
- Founded: 1992 (Kansas)
- Headquarters: Kansas
- Area served: Lawrence, Kansas and Baldwin City, Kansas
- Products: Affordable housing
- Website: tenants-to-homeowners.org

Tenants to Homeowners (TTH) is a nonprofit community land trust and affordable rental program that develops and preserves affordable housing in Douglas County, Kansas.

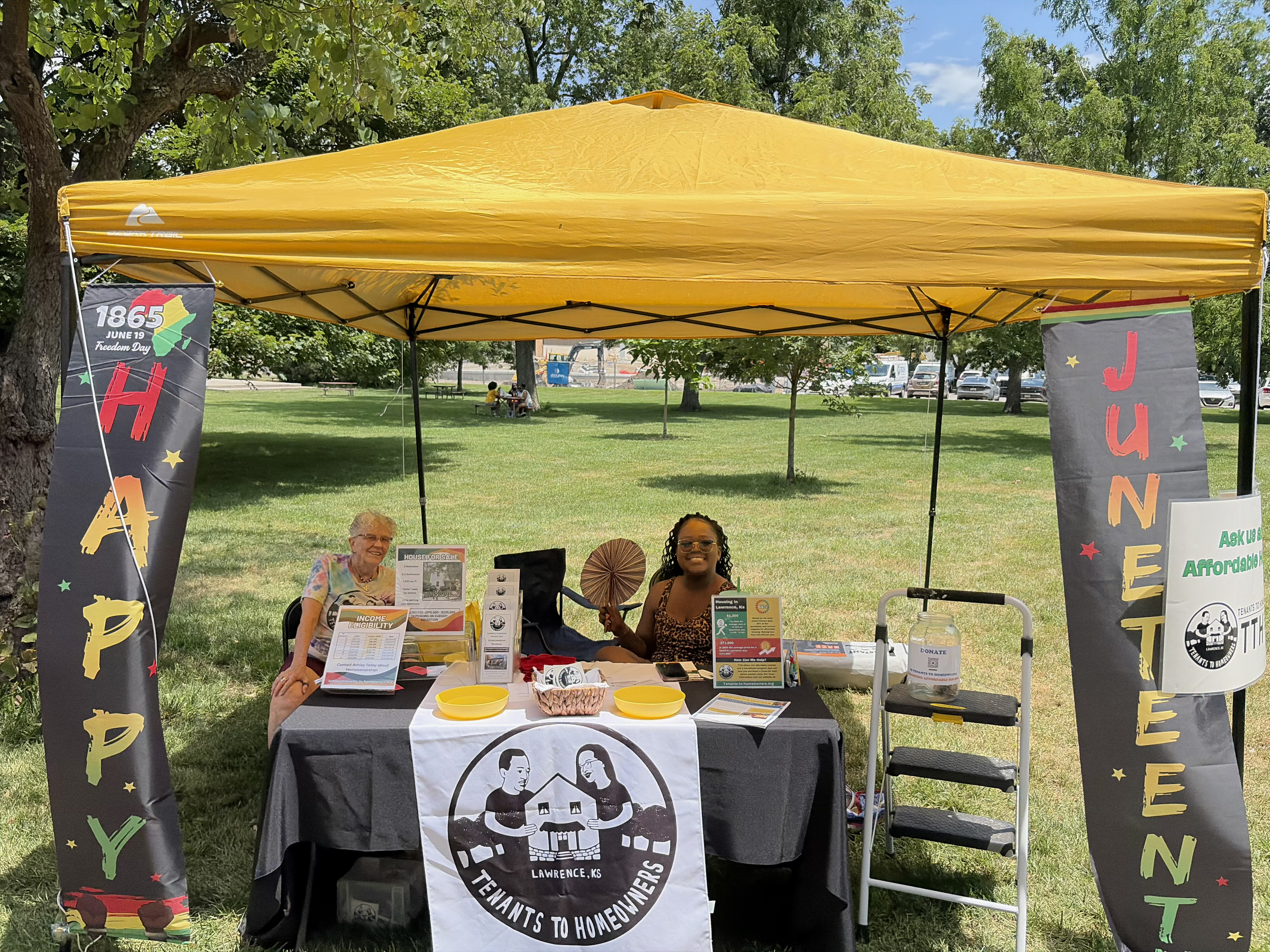
Tenants to Homeowners tabling at Juneteenth festival in Lawrence, KS

== History ==
Tenants to Homeowners has operated since 1992. The program holds over 100 properties in land trusts. The nonprofit also works with the city of Lawrence and Habitat for Humanity to rehabilitate abandoned houses into affordable housing.

== Funding ==
TTH receives HUD grants, private donors, grants from the Lawrence city government, grants from the Douglas County government, and money from the affordable housing sales tax.

The organization purchases land from private entities or the local government to be repurposed into affordable rentals or homes. Often land is donated to the land trust as well.

== Program structure ==
=== Rentals ===
Tenants to Homeowners builds "affordable" rental properties. Eligibility for the TTH rental program is means-tested at 80% of the average median income of Douglas County. In addition to standard rental units, the organization has senior and accessible housing available. Tenants may have to wait in a waiting pool before renting.

=== Homeownership ===
The program requires prospective owners to fulfill various steps to qualify. One includes attending a homebuyer workshop put on by TTH at the Lawrence Public Library.

Eligibility for the homeownership program is means-tested at 120% of the average median income of Douglas County as of 2026. Homeowners must have a credit score of 670 or higher, must have no bankruptcies in the past two years, and must pay bills on time. Tenants to Homeowners does not provide community land trust arrangements to landlords, and homes must be owner-occupied.
