= Norristown, Pennsylvania =

Borough in Pennsylvania, United States

- Home-rule borough
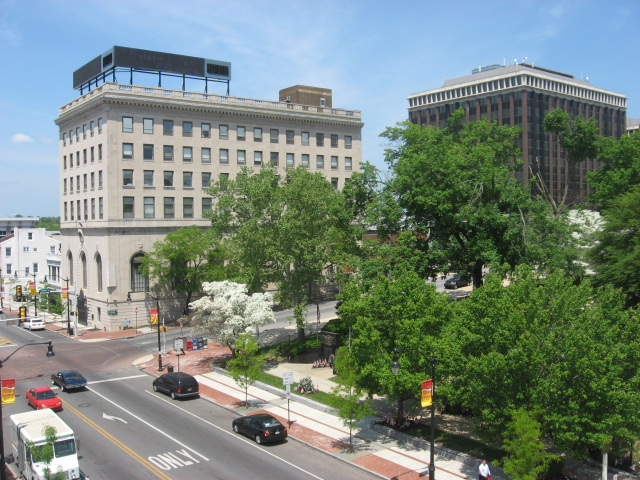
- Main and Swede streets, May 2011

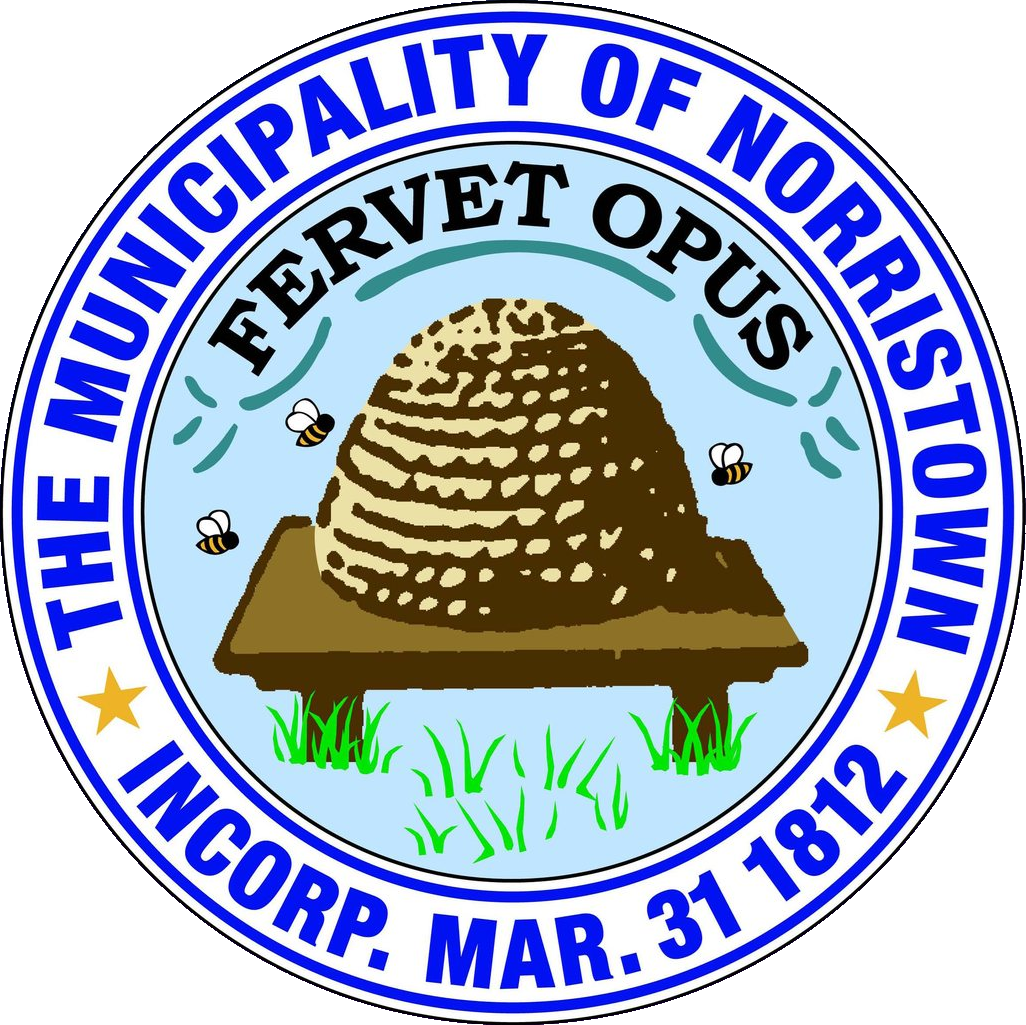
- Flag Seal

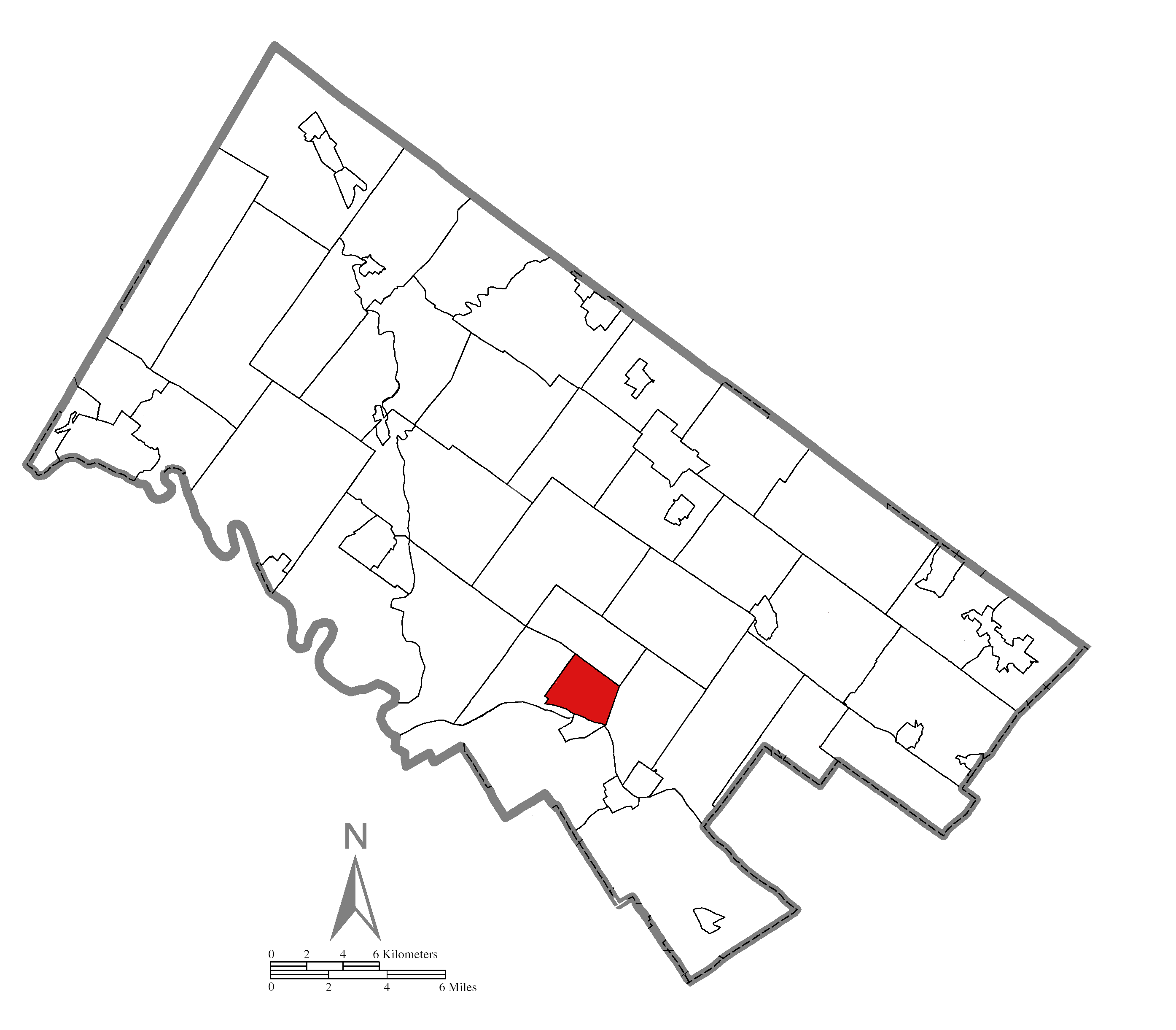
- Location of Norristown in Montgomery County, Pennsylvania

- Location of Norristown in Pennsylvania Norristown (the United States)
- Coordinates: 40°07′12″N 75°20′30″W
- Country: United States
- State: Pennsylvania
- County: Montgomery
- Settled: 1682
- Borough: 1812
- Municipality: 1986
- Founder: Issac Norris

Government
  - Type: Council–manager

Area
  - Total: 3.60 sq mi (9.33 km^{2})
  - Land: 3.51 sq mi (9.10 km^{2})
  - Water: 0.089 sq mi (0.23 km^{2})
- Elevation: 135 ft (41 m)

Population (2020)
  - Total: 35,748
  - Density: 10,169.4/sq mi (3,926.44/km^{2})
- Demonym: Norristonians
- Time zone: UTC-5 (EST)
  - Summer (DST): UTC-4 (EDT)
- ZIP Codes: 19401, 19403–19409, 19487–19489
- Area codes: 610 and 484
- FIPS code: 42-54656
- Website: www.norristown.org

Norristown is a borough with home rule status and the county seat of Montgomery County, Pennsylvania, United States, in the Philadelphia metropolitan area. Located along the Schuylkill River, approximately 6 miles (9.7 km) from Philadelphia, Norristown had a population of 35,748 as of the 2020 census. It is the fourth-most populous municipality in the county and second-most populous borough in Pennsylvania.

It is the largest non-township municipality in Montgomery County and is located 49.8 miles (80.1 km) southeast of Allentown and 19.9 miles (32.0 km) northwest of Philadelphia.

== History ==
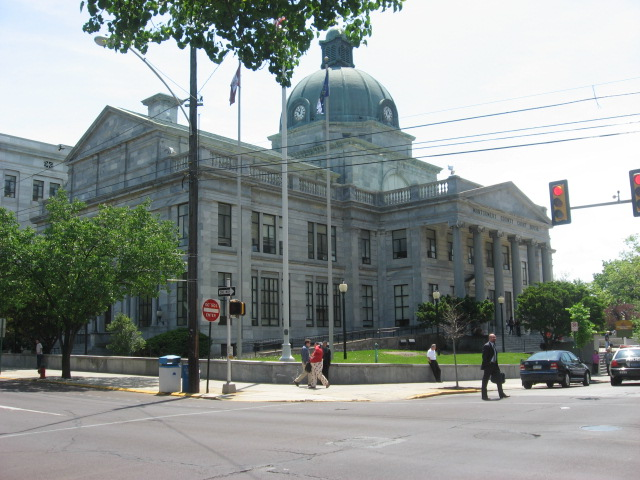
Montgomery County Courthouse

Present-day Norristown was originally owned by the family of Isaac Norris. Along with William Trent, Norris purchased the land on October 7, 1704, for 50¢ per acre. In 1712, Norris acquired Trent's share and established a gristmill at the foot of present-day Water Street.

Named the county seat in 1784 when Montgomery County was formed, Norristown was incorporated as a borough in 1812 and subsequently enlarged in 1853. About 500 people lived there at the time of its incorporation. Growing rapidly after the Civil War, it swelled to 22,265 people by 1900. By 1940 it was home to 38,181 Norristonians, making it the most populous borough in Pennsylvania before declining in the decades after World War II, and in fact it was described in that year as "the most populous independent borough in the United States."

At its height, Norristown was an industrial, retail, banking, and government center. Breweries, cigar factories, textile mills, icehouses, foundries, rolling mills, and lumber yards provided ample employment for skilled laborers and artisans. The downtown featured two department stores, several theaters, and enough goods and services that residents never had to leave town to find anything they needed. Although primarily settled by the English and a handful of Germans, Scots, Dutch, and Swedes, in the mid-1800s the Irish began arriving in large numbers, followed by waves of Italians at the turn of the 20th century.

With the opening of new malls in nearby King of Prussia and Plymouth Meeting, the downtown declined in the decades after World War II. Industry soon followed, as many companies closed or relocated into new industrial parks throughout Montgomery County.

== Geography ==
Norristown is located in southeastern Pennsylvania, approximately 6 mi (10 km) northwest of Philadelphia, although direct driving distance from downtown Norristown to Center City Philadelphia is about 17 mi (27 km). Totaling 3.519 square miles in land area, the municipality sits along the Schuylkill River. Two major tributaries, the Stony Creek and the Saw Mill Run, bisect the town into thirds and empty directly into the Schuylkill. The town's terrain is generally hilly, especially in the areas closest to downtown, which itself sits on a plateau surrounded by all three major waterways.

Norristown has four distinct neighborhoods: the West End, the East End, the North End, and the downtown.

It is bounded by West Norriton, East Norriton, and Plymouth townships, as well as the borough of Bridgeport.

=== Climate ===
In the Köppen climate classification, the borough has a humid subtropical climate (Cfa) according to recent temperature numbers. The Trewartha climate classification now has the climate as Do (oceanic because only seven months are above 50 °F.) The hardiness zone is 7a or 7b depending upon elevation.

Climate data for Norristown, Pennsylvania (1991–2020 normals, extremes 1951–present)
Month	Jan	Feb	Mar	Apr	May	Jun	Jul	Aug	Sep	Oct	Nov	Dec	Year
Record high °F (°C)	76 (24)	78 (26)	84 (29)	98 (37)	98 (37)	100 (38)	108 (42)	106 (41)	102 (39)	92 (33)	85 (29)	76 (24)	108 (42)
Mean daily maximum °F (°C)	41.7 (5.4)	43.5 (6.4)	52.1 (11.2)	64.8 (18.2)	74.8 (23.8)	84.0 (28.9)	88.8 (31.6)	86.5 (30.3)	80.0 (26.7)	68.4 (20.2)	56.8 (13.8)	46.3 (7.9)	65.6 (18.7)
Daily mean °F (°C)	32.1 (0.1)	34.1 (1.2)	41.8 (5.4)	53.1 (11.7)	63.4 (17.4)	73.0 (22.8)	77.7 (25.4)	75.9 (24.4)	68.8 (20.4)	56.5 (13.6)	45.9 (7.7)	37.3 (2.9)	55.0 (12.8)
Mean daily minimum °F (°C)	22.6 (−5.2)	24.7 (−4.1)	31.6 (−0.2)	41.5 (5.3)	52.1 (11.2)	62.0 (16.7)	66.6 (19.2)	65.2 (18.4)	57.6 (14.2)	44.6 (7.0)	35.1 (1.7)	28.3 (−2.1)	44.3 (6.8)
Record low °F (°C)	−12 (−24)	−5 (−21)	8 (−13)	15 (−9)	29 (−2)	41 (5)	48 (9)	40 (4)	35 (2)	26 (−3)	14 (−10)	−10 (−23)	−12 (−24)
Average precipitation inches (mm)	3.66 (93)	2.98 (76)	4.41 (112)	3.90 (99)	4.25 (108)	4.20 (107)	4.70 (119)	4.98 (126)	4.91 (125)	4.32 (110)	3.61 (92)	4.73 (120)	50.65 (1,287)
Average snowfall inches (cm)	6.8 (17)	10.9 (28)	3.0 (7.6)	0.2 (0.51)	0.0 (0.0)	0.0 (0.0)	0.0 (0.0)	0.0 (0.0)	0.0 (0.0)	0.1 (0.25)	0.1 (0.25)	4.2 (11)	25.3 (64)
Average precipitation days (≥ 0.01 in)	11.0	9.4	11.1	12.8	14.1	11.9	10.7	10.4	8.9	11.2	9.3	10.5	131.3
Average snowy days (≥ 0.1 in)	3.3	2.9	1.6	0.1	0.0	0.0	0.0	0.0	0.0	0.1	0.1	1.4	9.5
Source: NOAA

== Demographics ==
Historical population
Census	Pop.	Note	%±
1820	827		—
1830	1,089		31.7%
1840	2,937		169.7%
1850	6,024		105.1%
1860	8,848		46.9%
1870	10,753		21.5%
1880	13,063		21.5%
1890	19,791		51.5%
1900	22,265		12.5%
1910	27,875		25.2%
1920	32,319		15.9%
1930	35,853		10.9%
1940	38,181		6.5%
1950	38,126		−0.1%
1960	38,925		2.1%
1970	38,169		−1.9%
1980	34,684		−9.1%
1990	30,749		−11.3%
2000	31,282		1.7%
2010	34,324		9.7%
2020	35,748		4.1%

=== 2020 census ===
As of the 2020 census, Norristown had a population of 35,748. The median age was 33.4 years. 26.4% of residents were under the age of 18 and 10.5% of residents were 65 years of age or older. For every 100 females there were 100.7 males, and for every 100 females age 18 and over there were 99.0 males age 18 and over.

100.0% of residents lived in urban areas, while 0.0% lived in rural areas.

There were 12,669 households in Norristown, of which 35.1% had children under the age of 18 living in them. Of all households, 29.4% were married-couple households, 23.6% were households with a male householder and no spouse or partner present, and 36.8% were households with a female householder and no spouse or partner present. About 30.9% of all households were made up of individuals and 9.1% had someone living alone who was 65 years of age or older.

There were 13,974 housing units, of which 9.3% were vacant. The homeowner vacancy rate was 1.6% and the rental vacancy rate was 7.2%.

Racial composition as of the 2020 census
Race	Number	Percent
White	10,370	29.0%
Black or African American	11,548	32.3%
American Indian and Alaska Native	513	1.4%
Asian	836	2.3%
Native Hawaiian and Other Pacific Islander	13	0.0%
Some other race	7,769	21.7%
Two or more races	4,699	13.1%
Hispanic or Latino (of any race)	12,588	35.2%

=== Demographic estimates ===
There were 7,498 families residing in the municipality. The population density was 9,753.9 people per square mile.

In an earlier estimate, 62.7% of households were family households and 37.3% were non-family households. Of the 7,498 families, 58.2% had their own and related children under the age of 18 living with them; 51.0% were married couples living together, and 36.6% had a female householder with no husband present. The average household size was 2.79 and the average family size was 3.41.

43.5% of residents were between ages 18 and 44, and 21.2% were between ages 45 and 64.

According to the U.S. Census Bureau's 2012 American Community Survey, the median household income was $42,764. Males had a median income of $34,214 versus $34,086 for females. The per capita income was $21,204. About 17.3% of families and 19.3% of the population were below the poverty line, including 28.3% of those under the age of 18 and 11.8% of those 65 and older.

Approximately 76.0% of all persons 25 and older have a high school diploma or higher, while 16.7% have a college degree (Bachelor's or higher).

== Economy ==
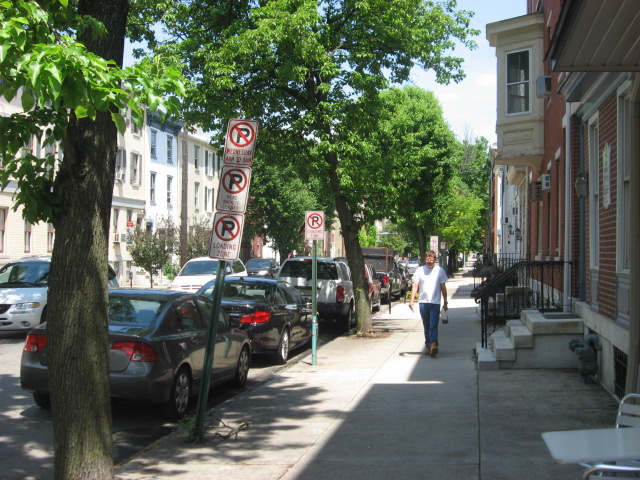
Lawyers' offices on Swede Street

Norristown's economy is based largely on institutions in the government, healthcare, legal, and social services sectors. The Montgomery County government is the municipality's largest employer. Major Norristown employers include the Pennsylvania Department of Environmental Protection (DEP), the Montgomery County Intermediate Unit, the Norristown Area School District, and others.

== Politics and government ==
Presidential elections results
Year	Republican	Democratic
2024	21.0% 2,303	77.8% 8,521
2020	17.8% 2,099	81.4% 9,600
2016	17.1% 1,891	79.7% 8,826
2012	16.0% 1,749	83.0% 9,053
2008	17.0% 2,042	82.3% 9,911
2004	24.2% 2,611	75.3% 8,147
2000	24.6% 2,066	73.0% 6,124

Norristown has been a home rule municipality since 1986 when voters adopted a charter with a manager/council form of government and a seven-member municipal council. The office of mayor was abolished in July 2004 after a public referendum amended the municipal charter. Executive and administrative authority is now delegated to a council appointed Municipal Manager.

The municipality is part of the Fifth Congressional District (represented by Rep. Mary Gay Scanlon), the 70th State House Districts (represented by Rep. Matt Bradford) and the 17th State Senate District (represented by Sen. Amanda Cappelletti).

== Infrastructure ==
=== Transportation ===
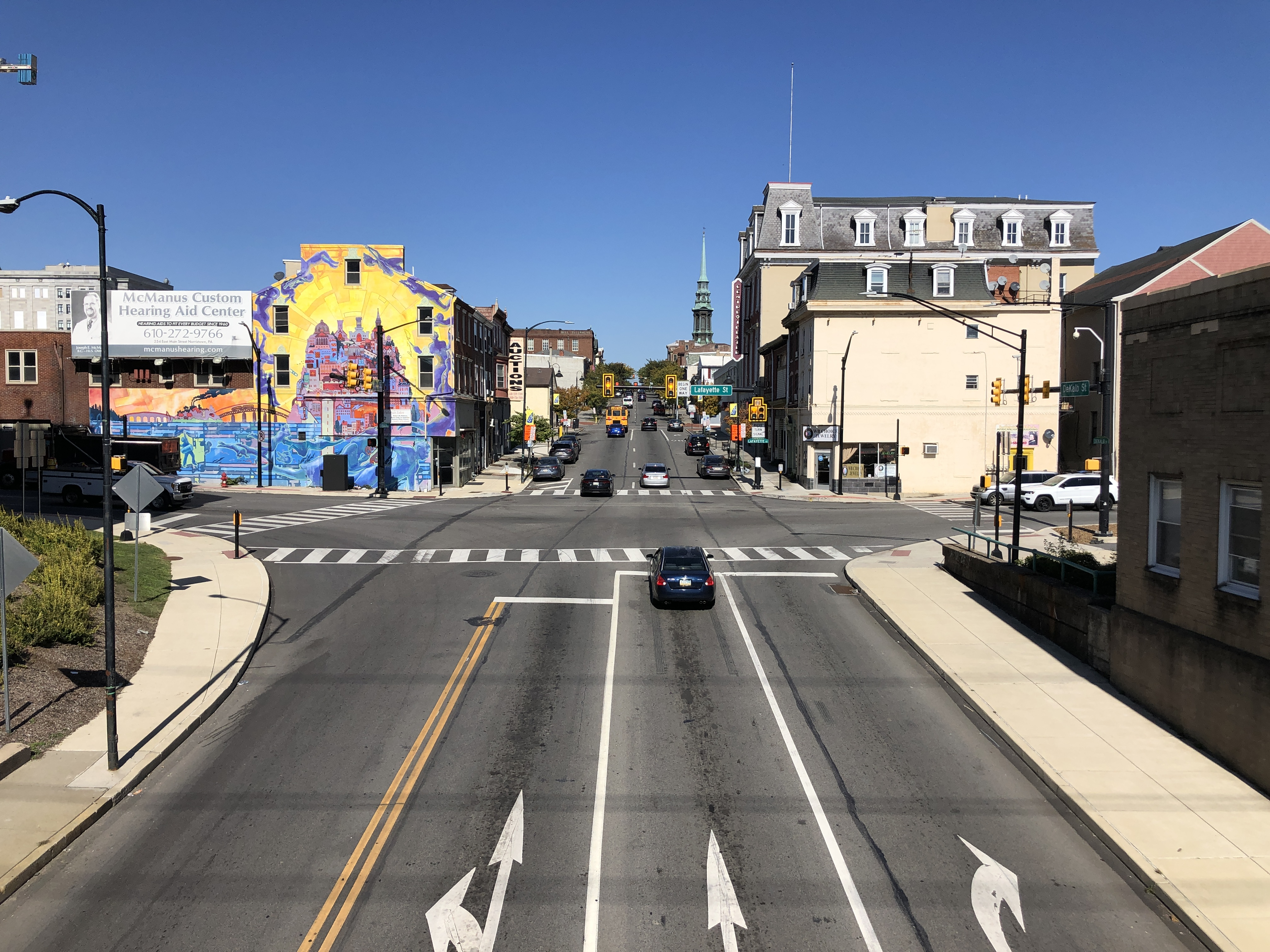
U.S. Route 202 northbound entering downtown Norristown

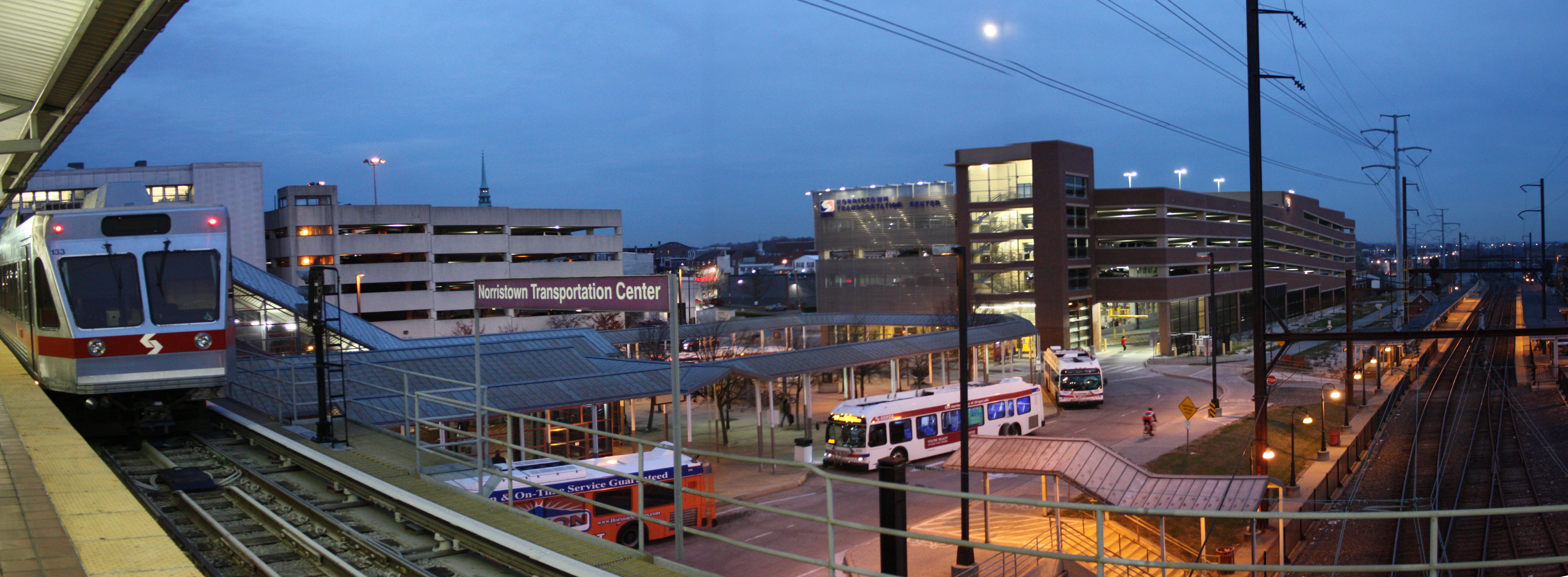
Norristown Transportation Center

As of 2015 there were 56.07 miles (90.24 km) of public roads in Norristown, of which 3.81 miles (6.13 km) were maintained by the Pennsylvania Department of Transportation (PennDOT) and 52.26 miles (84.10 km) were maintained by the borough.

Norristown sits near the junction of several major roads in the Philadelphia metropolitan area. Main Street, also known as Ridge Pike, outside of the municipality, and Airy Street run east–west through the downtown, eventually leading to interchanges for I-476 (the Blue Route) and the Pennsylvania Turnpike (I-276), respectively, in Plymouth Meeting. US 202 is the major north–south route through the town, connecting it with other nearby county seats such as Doylestown and West Chester. US 202 is split into a one-way pair through the municipality, as DeKalb Street is designated “US 202 North” while Markley Street is signed “US 202 South.”

Norristown is the largest multi-modal transportation hub in Montgomery County. Numerous rail lines, bus routes, multi-use trails, and parking areas converge at the Norristown Transportation Center (NTC). SEPTA operates eight Suburban Division bus routes (90, 91, 93, 96, 97, 98, 99, and 131), one interurban rapid transit route, the Norristown High Speed Line to 69th Street Transportation Center, and a Regional Rail line (the Manayunk/Norristown Line to Center City Philadelphia) out of the NTC complex.

The Regional Rail station at the Norristown Transportation Center is one of three on the Manayunk/Norristown Line in Norristown. The other two are Main Street and Elm Street, the latter of which serves as the terminus of the line.

The NTC contains a 522-space SEPTA commuter parking garage that also contains an intercity bus terminal that was formerly used by Bieber Transportation Group, Greyhound Lines, and Martz Trailways. Several taxi companies and private bus shuttles have a presence at the Transportation Center. The Schuylkill River Trail, which connects Philadelphia to Pottstown and runs through downtown Norristown, also passes through the NTC complex. The Chester Valley Trail will also connect to the Transportation Center in the future.

=== Utilities ===
Electricity and natural gas in Norristown is provided by PECO Energy Company, a subsidiary of Exelon. Water is provided by Pennsylvania American Water, a subsidiary of American Water. The Norristown Municipal Waste Authority provides sewer service, operating collection sewers and a wastewater treatment plant. Trash and recycling collection is provided under contract by J.P. Mascaro.

== Media ==
The Times Herald is the borough's daily newspaper, printing seven days a week and serving most of Montgomery County. Founded on June 15, 1799, it is currently owned by 21st Century Media. The paper's staff offices are located within the municipality.

== Culture ==
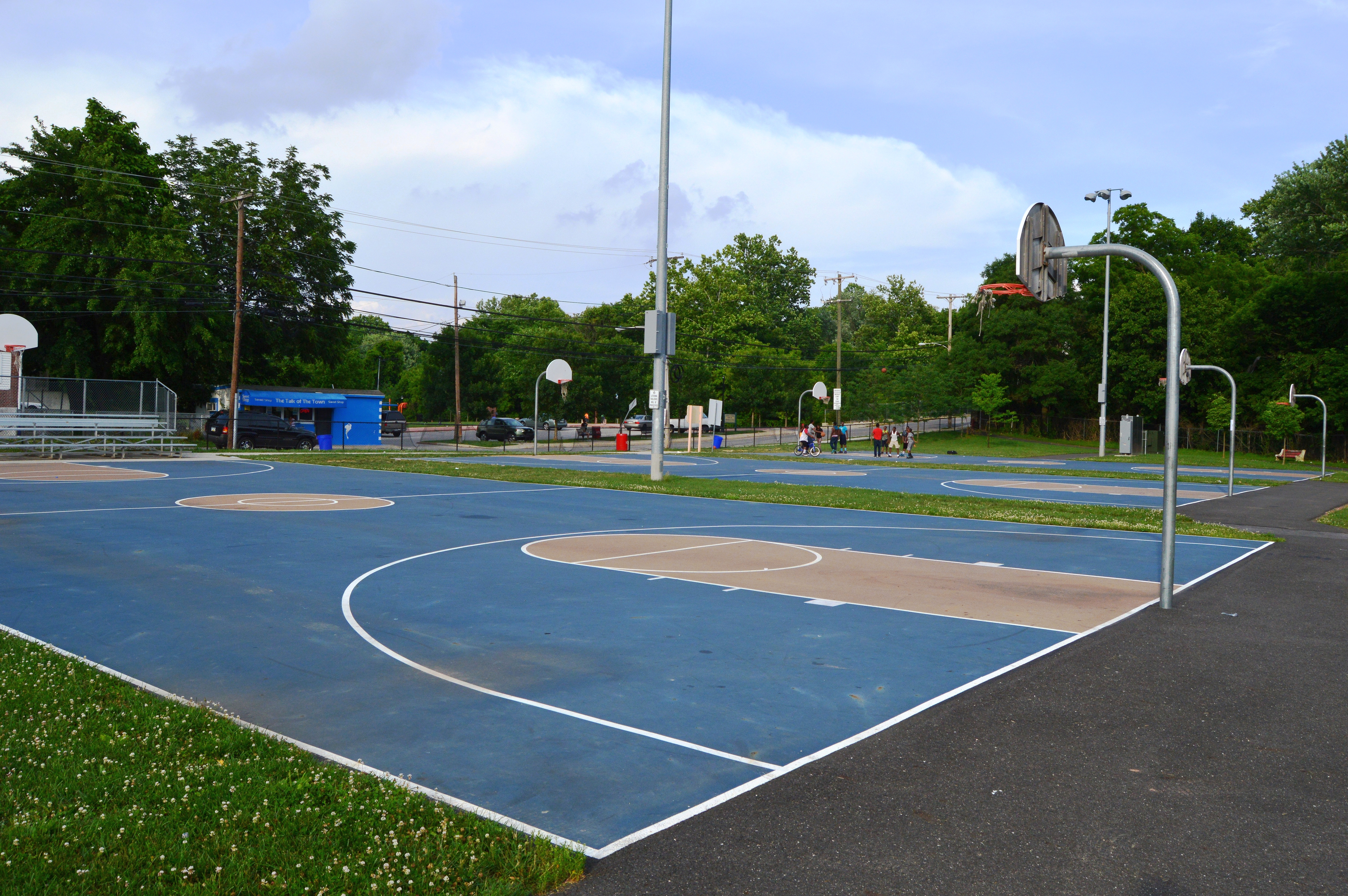
Simmons Park

Despite the loss of its historic movie and vaudeville theaters, Norristown is home to two performing arts centers, the Montgomery County Cultural Center and Centre Theatre, and one professional theater company, Theatre Horizon. All are part of The Theatre Alliance of Greater Philadelphia and the Greater Philadelphia Cultural Alliance.

These theaters form the nucleus for Norristown Arts Hill, a collection of theaters, art galleries, and professional firms on the 300-500 blocks of DeKalb Street in downtown.

== Revitalization ==
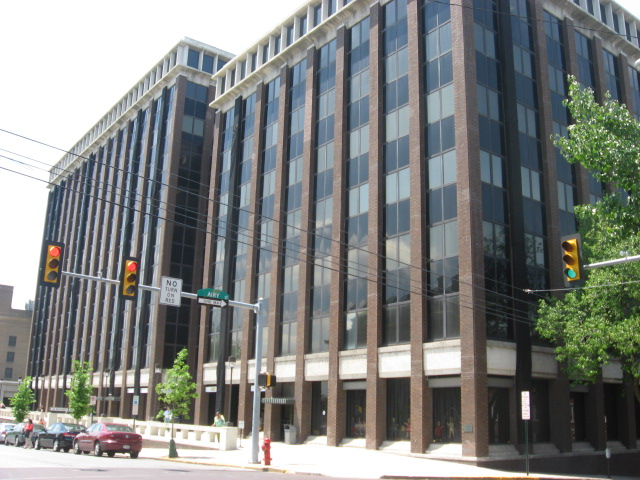
One Montgomery Plaza Office Building

Norristown has seen several new office buildings constructed or rehabbed over the last several decades. One Montgomery Plaza, the municipality's iconic downtown 10-story office building, was built in the early 1970s, and is now owned by Montgomery County. Two newer mid-rise downtown office buildings, the Montgomery County Intermediate Unit Building and the Department of Environmental Protection Building, were built in the 1990s and early 2000s. In 2009, the historic former Bell Telephone building was completely renovated for offices, and that same year the U.S. Roofing Corporation rehabbed the former Conte Luna pasta factory on East Main Street to house their operations. The former Sears building at the Studio Centre shopping center in the North End was renovated as a modern office center.

Since the early 2000s, Regatta Apartments, the Rittenhouse condominium building, the Luxor, and dozens of new townhouses have contributed to a residential boom in the East End.

Two new downtown parking garages were built in the late 2000s, one at Main and Cherry Streets for visitors and another at SEPTA’s Norristown Transportation Center on Lafayette Street. Several large downtown and neighborhood streetscape projects were completed by the municipal government to install new street lighting, trees, curbing, and sidewalks along Main Street, DeKalb Street, and Powell Street.

The Lafayette Street Extension Project, a $60 million effort by Montgomery County, PennDOT, and the Federal Highway Administration (FHWA), is now open to traffic. It has improved highway access and mobility into downtown Norristown by widening Lafayette Street and extending it eastward toward Ridge Pike and Conshohocken, with eventual connections to the Pennsylvania Turnpike (I-276) and the US 202 Dannehower Bridge.

== Education ==
Norristown Area School District is the local school district.

St. Francis of Assisi School is located in Norristown.

Other area Catholic schools include Visitation B.V.M. School in West Norriton Township, near the Trooper census-designated place and near Norristown; Holy Rosary Regional Catholic School in Plymouth Meeting and Plymouth Township; and Mother Teresa Regional Catholic School in King of Prussia.

Holy Rosary was formed in 2012 by the merger of St. Titus School in East Norriton Township, Epiphany of Our Lord School in Plymouth Meeting, and Our Lady of Victory in East Norriton. Mother Teresa formed in 2012 by the merger of St. Teresa of Avila in West Norriton Township and Mother of Divine Providence in King of Prussia. Both St. Titus and St. Teresa had Norristown, Pennsylvania postal addresses but were not in the city proper.

== Notable locations ==
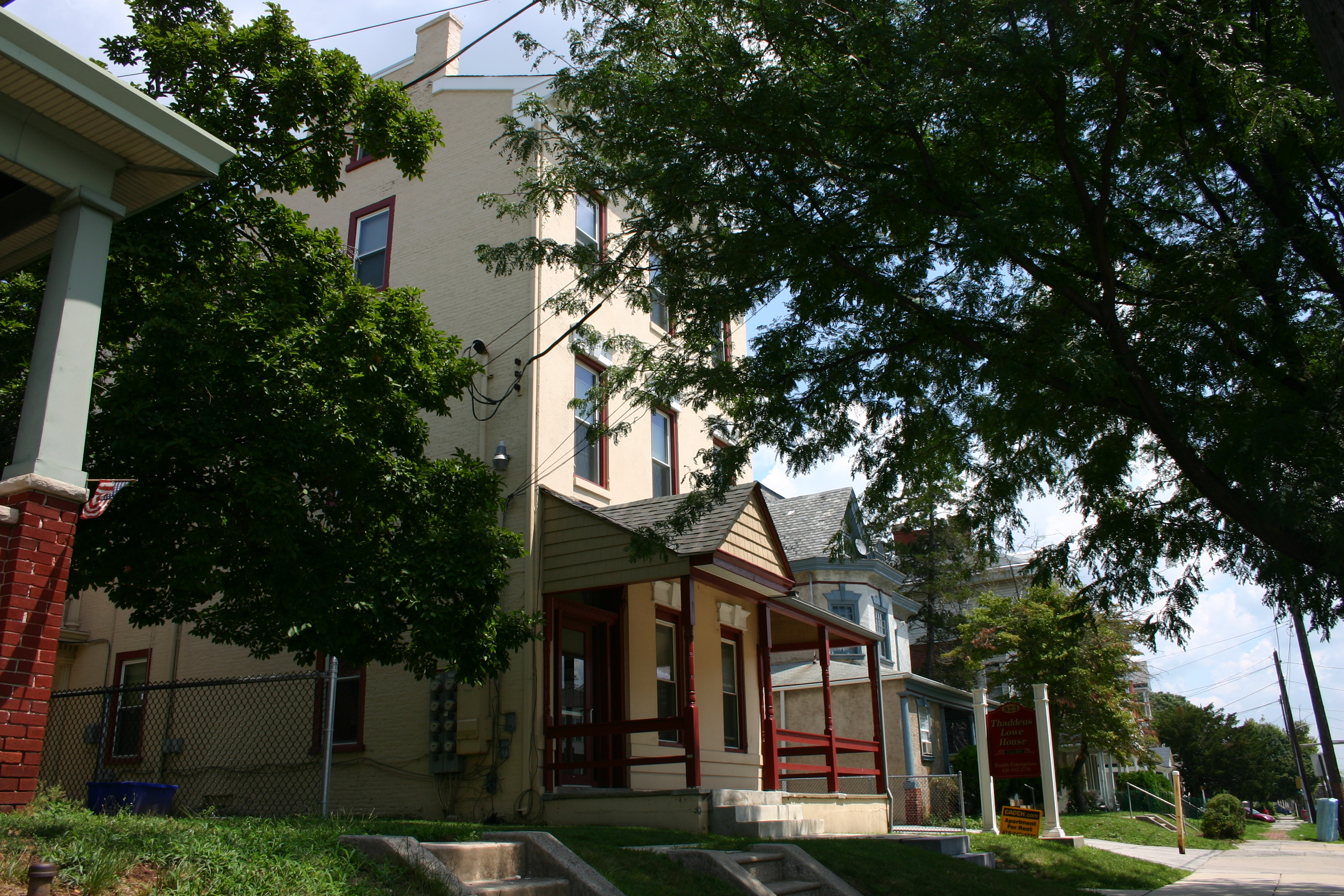
Thaddeus Lowe House

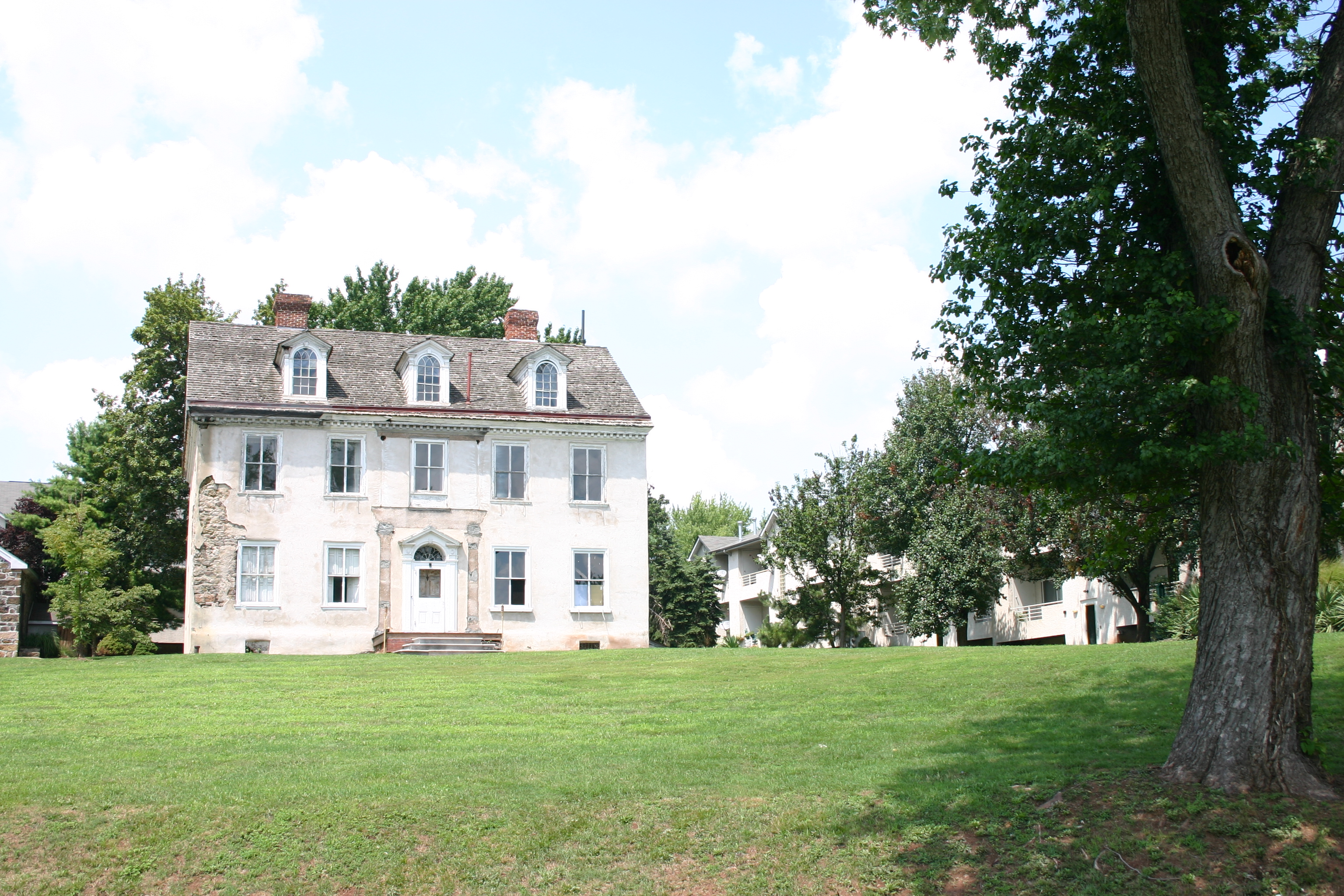
Selma Mansion

- Elmwood Park Zoo
- Norristown Farm Park
- Norristown State Hospital
- Norristown Transportation Center
- Schuylkill River Trail
- Selma Mansion
- Thaddeus Lowe House

== Notable people ==
- Nia Ali, track & field olympian
- Geno Auriemma, Hall of Fame women's basketball coach, UConn
- Jan Backus, former Vermont State Senator
- Franny Beecher, guitarist, Bill Haley & His Comets
- Maria Bello, actress, ER and A History of Violence
- Charles L Blockson, Historian
- Betty Bobbitt, actress, Prisoner Cell Block H
- Steve Bono, former NFL quarterback
- Daniel Shaw,Engineering Hall of Fame, Millersville University
- Tom Borton, jazz saxophonist, songwriter and composer
- Peter Boyle, actor (Everybody Loves Raymond, Young Frankenstein)
- Harry Roberts Carson, Episcopal Bishop of Haiti
- Josh Culbreath, athlete (1957 400 m hurdles world record), actor
- Richard Derr, actor
- David C. Dolby, Medal of Honor
- Werner Erhard, founder, Erhard Seminars Training
- Jules Fisher, lighting designer
- Joseph Fornance, U.S. Congressman and Norristown Borough council president
- Larry Glueck, football player for Villanova and 1963 NFL champion Chicago Bears, head coach for Fordham University
- Marques Green, basketball player
- Winfield Scott Hancock, field commander at Gettysburg, presidential candidate
- John F. Hartranft, Governor of Pennsylvania 1873–1879
- Philip Jaisohn, first Korean to become a naturalized citizen of the United States
- Gertrude I. Johnson (1876—1961), co-founder of Johnson & Wales University, born and died in Norristown
- Maud Coan Josaphare (1886-1935), arts educator and writer
- Tommy Lasorda, manager of Los Angeles Dodgers, Baseball Hall of Famer
- Drew Lewis, CEO Union Pacific, U.S. Secretary of Transportation
- Eugene Lewis, Canadian Football League wide receiver
- Thaddeus Lowe, Civil War-era aeronaut, scientist, and inventor
- Bobby Mitchell, professional baseball player
- William Moore, U.S. Congressman representing New Jersey 1869–1871
- Timothy L. O'Brien, journalist
- Jaco Pastorius, bass guitarist, musician
- John Pergine, NFL linebacker
- Mike Piazza, professional baseball player, Baseball Hall of Fame catcher of the New York Mets
- George Bryan Porter, Territorial Governor of Michigan
- David Rittenhouse Porter, Governor of Pennsylvania 1839–1845
- Jack Posobiec, political operative, conspiracy theorist
- Catherine Pugh, 50th Mayor of Baltimore
- Martha Settle Putney, educator and historian
- Brothers Quay (Stephen and Timothy), stop-motion animators
- Lisa Raymond, WTA tennis player
- Cam Reddish, NBA basketball player, played collegiately for the Duke Blue Devils
- Bill Schonely, broadcaster
- Richard Schweiker, U.S. Senator from Pennsylvania, Secretary of Health and Human Services
- Jimmy Smith, jazz musician
- Art Spiegelman, cartoonist, Maus
- Jerry Spinelli, author
- John Swana, jazz musician
- Kellee Stewart, actress
- Ralph B. Strassburger, newspaper publisher, thoroughbred racehorse owner
- John F. Street, Mayor of Philadelphia 2000–2008
- Roy Thomas, Philadelphia Phillies outfielder 1899-1908 and University of Pennsylvania head baseball coach
- Chris Visco, businesswomen and entrepreneur in the cannabis industry
- Christian Walker, professional baseball player, Houston Astros first baseman 2025–present
- Bobby Wine, professional baseball player, coach, manager and scout
- Khalif Wyatt (born 1991), basketball player for Hapoel Holon of the Israeli Basketball Premier League

== In popular culture ==
- Maniac Magee, author Jerry Spinelli based the fictional town of Two Mills on Norristown, where he was born.

== See also ==
- Battle of Matson's Ford
- East Norriton Township, Pennsylvania
- Norristown Academy
- Montgomery Cemetery
- Riverside Cemetery
- Saint Teresa of Avila School
- West Norriton Township, Pennsylvania

== Twin cities ==
- Ronse, Belgium
- Anzin, France
- M'saken, Tunisia
- Montella, Italy
