= Borough (Pennsylvania) =

Self-governing municipal entity

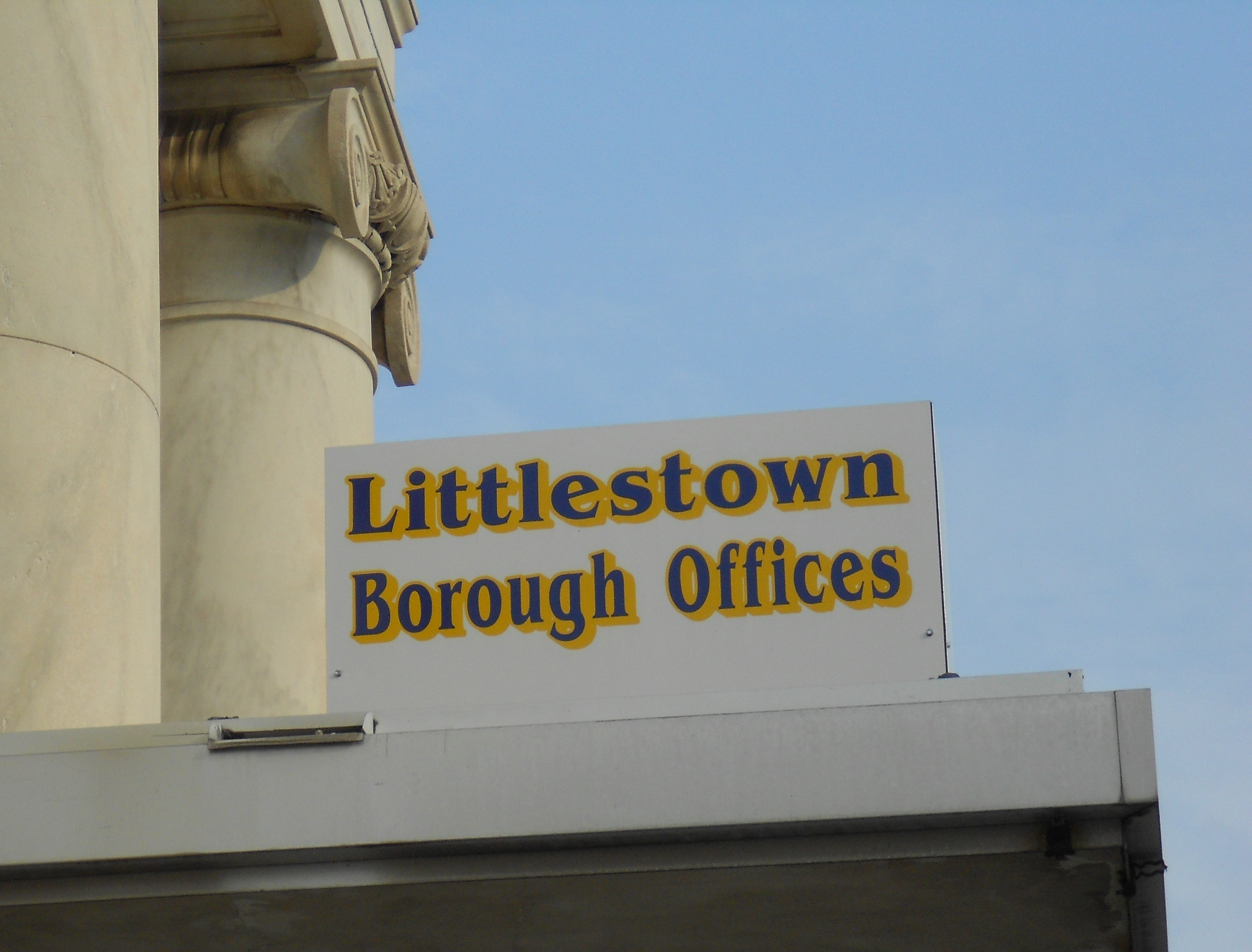
The municipal offices sign for Littlestown, Pennsylvania, a borough in the state

In the United States Commonwealth of Pennsylvania, a borough (sometimes spelled boro) is a self-governing municipal entity, equivalent to a town in most jurisdictions, usually smaller than a city, but with a similar population density in its residential areas. Sometimes thought of as "junior cities", boroughs generally have fewer powers and responsibilities than full-fledged cities.

== Description ==
All municipalities in Pennsylvania are classified as either cities, boroughs, or townships. The only exception is the town of Bloomsburg, recognized by the state government as the only incorporated town in Pennsylvania.

Compared to townships, boroughs tend to have more developed business districts and concentrations of public and commercial office buildings, including courthouses. Boroughs have larger populations, smaller aerial footprints, and more concentrated development than the average townships, with many boroughs being surrounded by a township of a related or even the same name.

There are 956 boroughs and 56 cities in Pennsylvania. Many home rule municipalities remain classified as boroughs or townships for certain purposes, even if the state's borough and township codes no longer apply to them.

== See also ==
- Borough (United States)
- List of towns and boroughs in Pennsylvania
