= Horace Porter =

United States Army Medal of Honor recipient and Union Army general (1837–1921)

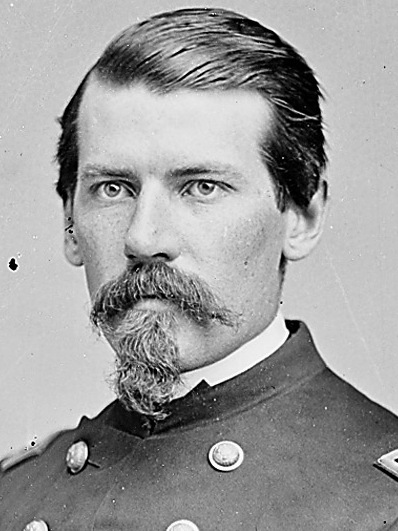
- Porter in the 1860s

United States Ambassador to France
- In office May 26, 1897 – May 2, 1905
- President: William McKinley; Theodore Roosevelt
- Preceded by: James B. Eustis
- Succeeded by: Robert S. McCormick

Personal details
- Born: April 15, 1837 Huntingdon, Pennsylvania, US
- Died: May 29, 1921 (aged 84) Manhattan, New York, US
- Resting place: West Long Branch, New Jersey, US
- Spouse: Sophie King McHarg (m. 1863; died 1903)
- Relations: Andrew Porter (cousin); Andrew Porter (grandfather); George Bryan Porter (uncle); James M. Porter (uncle)
- Children: 4
- Parent(s): David Rittenhouse Porter; Josephine McDermott
- Education: Lawrenceville School; Harvard University
- Alma mater: West Point
- Occupation: Soldier, author, President of the Union League Club of New York
- Awards: Medal of Honor; Legion of Honor

Military service
- Allegiance: United States; Union
- Branch/service: United States Army; Union Army
- Years of service: 1860–1873
- Rank: Colonel; Brevet Brigadier General
- Battles/wars: American Civil War; Battle of Chickamauga; Battle of Fort Pulaski; Battle of the Wilderness; Second Battle of Ream's Station

Horace C. Porter (April 15, 1837 – May 29, 1921) was an American soldier and diplomat who served as a lieutenant colonel, ordnance officer and staff officer in the Union Army during the American Civil War, personal secretary to General and President Ulysses S. Grant. He also was secretary to General William T. Sherman, vice president of the Pullman Palace Car Company and U.S. Ambassador to France from 1897 to 1905.

== Early life ==
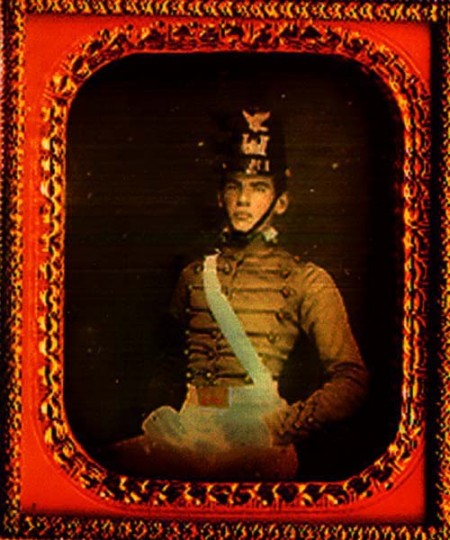
Porter as a cadet at West Point

Porter was born in Huntingdon, Pennsylvania, on April 15, 1837, the son of David Rittenhouse Porter (1788–1867), an ironmaster who later served as Governor of Pennsylvania, and Josephine McDermott.

His paternal grandfather was Andrew Porter, the Revolutionary War officer and his paternal uncles included George Bryan Porter, the Territorial Governor of Michigan, and James Madison Porter, the Secretary of War. Among his first cousins was Andrew Porter, a Mexican–American War veteran and Union Army brigadier general. His aunt, Elizabeth Porter, was the grandmother of Mary Todd Lincoln.

Porter was educated at The Lawrenceville School in Lawrenceville, New Jersey (class of 1856) and Harvard University. He graduated from West Point July 1, 1860.

== Career ==
Porter was commissioned a second lieutenant on April 22, 1861, and a first lieutenant on June 7, 1861. During the American Civil War, Porter served in the Union Army, reaching the grade of lieutenant colonel by the end of the war.

During the war, he served as chief of ordnance in the Army of the Potomac, Department of the Ohio and the Army of the Cumberland. He was distinguished in the Battle of Fort Pulaski, Georgia, at the Battle of Chickamauga, the Battle of the Wilderness and the Second Battle of Ream's Station (New Market Heights). On June 26, 1902, or July 8, 1902, Porter received the Medal of Honor for the Battle of Chickamauga as detailed in the citation noted below. In the last year of the war, he served on the staff of Gen. Ulysses S. Grant, later writing a lively memoir of the experience, Campaigning With Grant (1897).

From April 4, 1864, to July 25, 1866, Porter was aide-de-camp to General Ulysses S. Grant with the grade of lieutenant colonel in the regular army. On July 17, 1866, President Andrew Johnson nominated Porter for appointment as brevet brigadier general, to rank from March 13, 1866, and the U.S. Senate confirmed the appointment on July 23, 1866. From July 25, 1866, to March 4, 1869, Porter was aide-de-camp to General Ulysses S. Grant with the grade of colonel in the regular army.

=== Grant administration ===
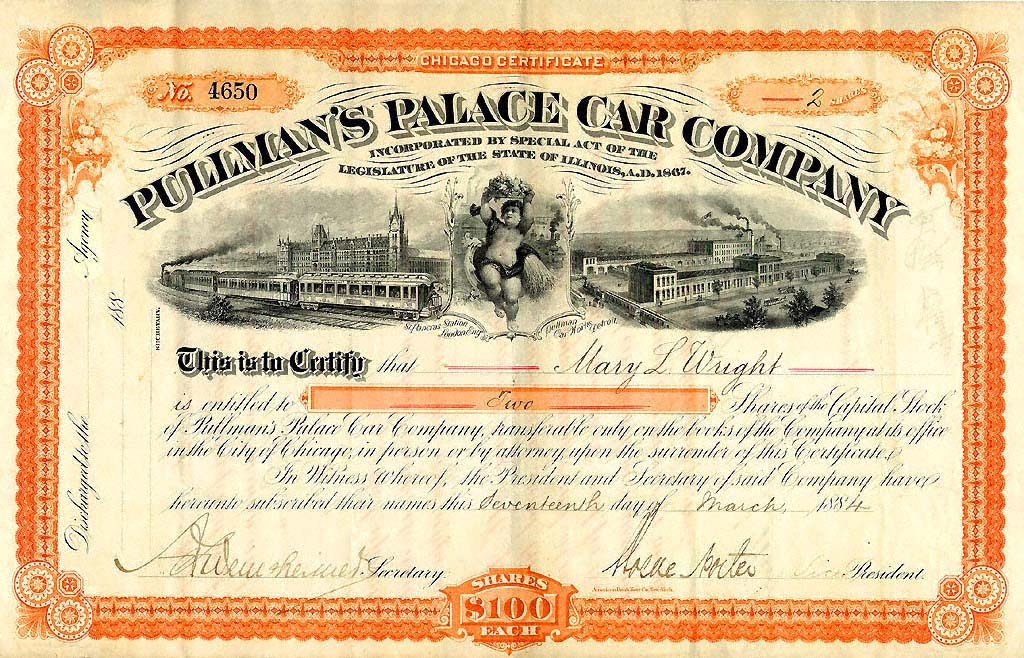
Pullman's Palace Car Co. stock certificate signed by Porter in 1884.

From 1869 to 1872, Porter served as President Grant's personal secretary in the White House. At the same time, he held the grade of colonel and an appointment as aide-de-camp to General William T. Sherman.

Porter had refused to take a $500,000 vested interest bribe from Jay Gould, a Wall Street financier, in the Black Friday gold market scam. He told Grant about Gould's attempted bribery, thus warning Grant about Gould's intention of cornering the gold market. However, during the Whiskey Ring trials in 1876, Treasury Solicitor Bluford Wilson claimed that Porter was involved with the scandal. Porter testified before the committee investigating the scandal and was never formally charged with wrongdoing. Porter resigned from the U.S. Army on December 31, 1873.

=== Later life ===
After resigning from the Army, Porter became vice president of the Pullman Palace Car Company, and later, president of the West Shore Railroad. He was U.S. Ambassador to France from 1897 to 1905, paying for the recovery of the body of John Paul Jones and sending it to the United States for re-burial. He received the Grand Cross of the Legion of Honor from the French government in 1904. In addition to Campaigning with Grant, he also wrote West Point Life (1866).

Porter was president of the Union League Club of New York from 1893 to 1897. In that capacity, he was a major force in the construction of Grant's Tomb.

He was elected an honorary member of the Pennsylvania Society of the Cincinnati in 1902. He was also a member of the Military Order of the Loyal Legion of the United States, the Sons of the American Revolution and a Hereditary Companion of the Military Order of Foreign Wars by right of his descent from Lieutenant Colonel Andrew Porter who served in the American Revolution.

In 1891 he joined the Empire State Society of the Sons of the American Revolution, where he served as President General from 1892 through 1896. He was assigned national membership number 4069 and state membership number 69.

He died in Manhattan, New York and is interred at the Old First Methodist Church Cemetery in West Long Branch, New Jersey.

== Personal life ==
In 1863, Porter was married to Sophie King McHarg (1840–1903), the daughter of John McHarg (1813–1884) and Martha Whipple Patch. Together, they were the parents of:

- Horace Porter Jr., who died at the age of 23 of typhoid fever.
- Clarence Porter, who died after the first World War.
- Elsie Porter, who married Edwin Mende of Berne, Switzerland.
- William Porter, who died in infancy.

After a period of suffering, Porter died at New York, New York, May 29, 1921. He was buried in West Long Branch Cemetery, West Long Branch, New Jersey. In his will, he left the Grant Association $10,000 and the flag that flew at General Grant's field headquarters during the Civil War.

== Medal of Honor citation ==

Rank and Organization:

Captain, Ordnance Department, U.S. Army. Place and date: At Chickamauga, Ga., September 20, 1863. Entered service at: Harrisburgh, Pa. Born: April 15, 1837, Huntington, Pa. Date of issue: July 8, 1902.

Citation:

While acting as a volunteer aide, at a critical moment when the lines were broken, rallied enough fugitives to hold the ground under heavy fire long enough to effect the escape of wagon trains and batteries.

== See also ==
- List of American Civil War Medal of Honor recipients: M–P
- List of American Civil War brevet generals (Union)

== Notes ==
Diplomatic posts
Preceded by James B. Eustis	U.S. Ambassador to France; 1897–1905	Succeeded by Robert S. McCormick
