= Abandoned housing rehabilitation =

Abandoned properties may be repurposed for affordable housing.

Abandoned housing rehabilitation is a process wherein abandoned homes or other real estate property is recovered, typically with the support of municipal government and nonprofits, to be repurposed into new housing stock.

== Background ==
Abandoned houses often are associated with squatting, pollution, and crime. In areas with urban decay or a housing shortage, government officials and the public may support the seizure of abandoned properties. These programs are a form of urban renewal, often with a focus on creating affordable housing in disinvested communities.

The sale of repurposed abandoned housing could help address the missing middle in the North American market.

== Changing ownership ==
When permitted by state legislation, a nonprofit may sue an owner of an abandoned property, and if a judge finds the building meets the criteria for an abandoned property, the nonprofit may take ownership of the property. Abandoned property law sets a time period in which the property must be vacant before a lawsuit may be presented (90 days in Kansas, for example).

Identifying whether a property is vacant can be difficult. In Lawrence, Kansas, the city government uses utility information as a part of its investigation.

Notifying an owner of pending litigation may be difficult, as the owner's current address may not be known. In cases where an owner is discovered, many fix up their properties without relinquishing ownership.

== Repurposing ==
Most homes chosen by rehabilitation nonprofits do not need to be demolished. Under these programs, historic houses can be preserved without falling into disrepair.

=== Sale ===
Rehabilitated houses are sometimes resold at or below market value. The process often goes through two buyers: the rehabber and a second purchaser who lives in the home as a primary residence.

=== Affordable rentals ===
Rehabilitated housing may be used as a part of affordable income-based rental projects.

== Challenges ==
Not all property owners sued under abandoned housing acts have abandoned their properties. Reliance on public-private partnerships may incentivize nonprofits to sue property owners whose properties require cheaper repairs.

== See also ==
- Abandoned and Blighted Property Conservatorship Act
- 21st Century ROAD to Housing Act -- created a pilot program for rehabilitating abandoned homes in the United States
