= Saint Teresa of Avila School =

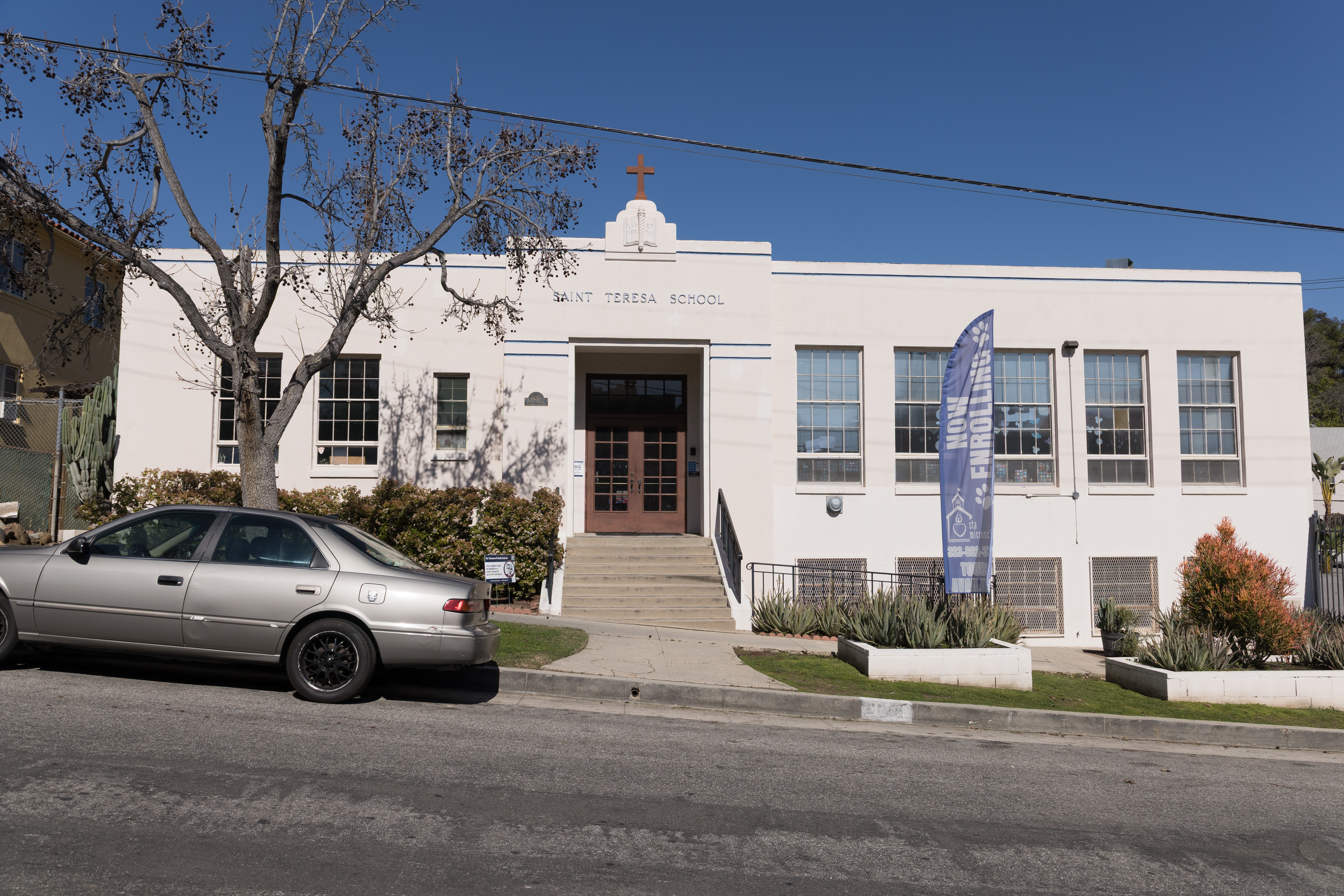

Location
- 2550 S. Parkview Drive; Norristown, Pennsylvania 19403; United States; 40.1131°N 75.4170°W

Information
- Type: Private, Coeducational
- Religious affiliation: Roman Catholic
- Established: 1960
- Closed: 2012
- School district: Archdiocese of Philadelphia
- Grades: Preschool-8
- Colors: Blue & gold
- Mascot: Tigers
- Accreditation: Middle States Association of Colleges and Schools
- Website: www.stteresaofavila.com

Saint Teresa of Avila School was a Catholic private elementary school, including 3-year-old preschool through Grade 8, part of the Roman Catholic Archdiocese of Philadelphia, located in Norristown, Pennsylvania.

It was decided by the Archdiocese of Philadelphia that certain Catholic grade schools and high schools would be closed; this included Saint Teresa of Avila school. Students will now attend Mother Teresa Regional Catholic School in King of Prussia, Pennsylvania.

== History ==
Although the first Mass at Saint Teresa of Avila Parish at its present site was celebrated in 1952, the parish school did not open its doors for another 8 years. Up to that time, children from Saint Teresa of Avila Parish attended either parochial schools associated either with St. Ann Parish in Phoenixville or St. Francis of Assisi Parish in Norristown.

The cornerstone for the school was laid by Father Raphael O'Brien in 1959, and the first classes were held the next year. The school, as we know it today, was not the same building that welcomed 96 students in September, 1960.

The interior design of the original school was different from what we know today, with the right wing divided into classrooms, and the left wing initially one large open room which served as an auditorium, cafeteria, and parish hall. As the school population grew, this open section was divided into temporary classrooms by using portable blackboards.

The Sisters, Servants of the Immaculate Heart of Mary, staffed Saint Teresa of Avila School. Most of the early classes were combined, with children from 2 grades being taught by a single teacher in one room. Mother Beatrice Marie was appointed the first principal.

Those early classes of students wore traditional uniforms. Boys were attired in white shirts, ties and navy slacks and blazers. The girls wore navy jumpers, black-and-white saddle shoes, and navy berets as a head covering when they went to church, where Masses were said in Latin.

In 1965, a large hall was added to the back of the school building. This served the dual function as a site for parish Masses on Sundays and a gymnasium/auditorium for school and parish activities. Beneath the hall, additional area was allocated for a library and later a kindergarten and nursery school. Initially the new hall was not utilized extensively by students during the school day because of its use for Sunday Masses.

After Father O'Brien retired, Father Thomas F. Walsh was appointed pastor of Saint Teresa of Avila. In 1974, Father Walsh oversaw the establishment of a kindergarten and in 1980, the nursery school program for 3 and 4 year olds. Seven years later, an addition was made to the left wing of the school to house the 7th and 8th grade classrooms. Part of the adjacent older section was remodeled to include a faculty room, copy room, computer room and conference room. In 1974, Father Walsh oversaw the establishment of a Kindergarten but this program closed shortly thereafter.

In 1980, with the blessing of Father Walsh and Sister Helen Marie, Joanne McCann and Mary Emily McCormick re-established the Kindergarten program and also founded a Pre-School program for 3- and 4-year-olds. These programs have grown and flourished, and in 2003, a full-day Kindergarten was opened.

In 1990, Father Walsh retired and the three remaining Immaculate Heart sisters were assigned other work, marking the end of 30 years of teaching excellence by the IHM sisters. Father Francis Kelly became the new Pastor of Saint Teresa of Avila, and in September 1990, the school began its first year under an all lay faculty headed by Mrs. Maria Brown, Principal. The school earned the prestigious Middle States accreditation in 1994. Father Kelly retired in 1998 and Monsignor Andrew Golias became Pastor. Mrs. Brown remained Principal of Saint Teresa of Avila School until her retirement in 2001, at which time, Mrs. Janet Lazorcheck was appointed Principal.

== Activities ==
- Catholic Youth Organization (CYO)
- Cub Scout Pack 650
- Brownies (Girl Scouts)
- Middle School Youth Group (Youth Club)

== Sports ==
Ran by Saint Teresa's CYO program, includes:

- Soccer
- Volleyball
- Cheerleading
- Basketball
- Baseball
- Softball
- Outdoor Track

== Notable alumni ==
- Maria Bello, actress; World Trade Center (film), Thank You for Smoking, Secret Window, Coyote Ugly (film), and ER (TV series)
