= David R. Porter =

9th Governor of Pennsylvania (1788–1867)

David Rittenhouse Porter
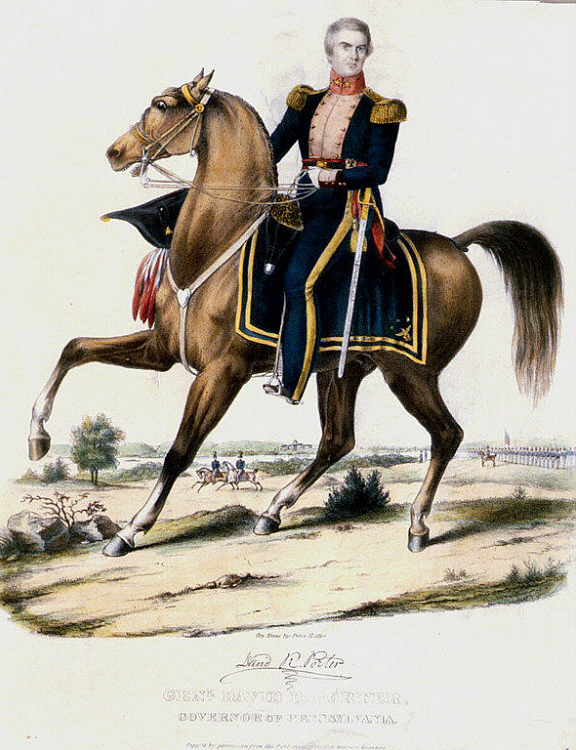

9th Governor of Pennsylvania
- In office January 15, 1839 – January 21, 1845
- Preceded by: Joseph Ritner
- Succeeded by: Francis R. Shunk

Member of the Pennsylvania House of Representatives
- In office 1819–1823

Member of the Pennsylvania Senate for the 8th district
- In office 1836–1838
- Preceded by: John Harper
- Succeeded by: Isaac Slenker

Personal details
- Born: October 31, 1788 Norristown, Pennsylvania, U.S.
- Died: August 6, 1867 (aged 78) Harrisburg, Pennsylvania, U.S.
- Party: Democratic
- Spouse: Josephine McDermott (m. 1820)
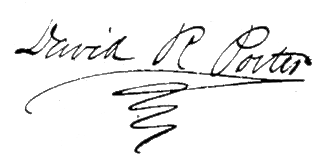
- Signature

David Rittenhouse Porter (October 31, 1788 – August 6, 1867) was the ninth governor of Pennsylvania. Voted into office during the controversial 1838 Pennsylvania gubernatorial election, which was characterized by intense anti-Masonic and anti-abolitionist rhetoric during and after the contest that sparked the post-election Buckshot War, he served as the state's chief executive officer from 1839 to 1845.

His son, Horace Porter, who was the aide-de-camp of Union General Ulysses S. Grant during the American Civil War, served as the United States Ambassador to France from 1897 to 1905.

== Early life and education ==
Porter, the first governor under the State Constitution of 1838, was born October 31, 1788, near Norristown, Montgomery County, Pennsylvania, spending his boyhood at Selma Mansion, a home built by his father in 1794. The son of Elizabeth (née Parker) and Andrew Porter, the Revolutionary War officer, he was also the brother of George Bryan Porter who became the Territorial Governor of Michigan from 1831 to 1834 and James Madison Porter who became the Secretary of War from 1843 to 1844.

Porter received a classical education at Norristown Academy. In 1813, he moved to Huntingdon where he studied law with Edward Shippen and eventually purchased an iron works.

Porter also became a member of the Huntingdon Lodge of the Freemasons, rising to the levels of Grand Master of his lodge and Deputy Grand Master of the Masonic district in which his lodge was located.

Due to the recession that followed the War of 1812 and his resulting business failure, his life changed markedly. Turning to politics in 1819, he also became a family man, marrying Josephine McDermott in 1820.

== Career ==
In 1819, Porter became a member of the Pennsylvania House of Representatives, representing Huntingdon County in 1819 and 1820. He then served in row offices in Huntingdon County and as a member of the Pennsylvania Senate for the 8th district from 1835 to 1838.

A resident of Huntingdon County in 1838, Porter was nominated for governor by the Jacksonian Democrats in order to mend the split between former Governor George Wolf and the Rev. Henry A. P. Muhlenberg, as well as defeat incumbent Governor Joseph Ritner's bid for a second term. His list of supporters included U.S. Senator James Buchanan, who would later become the 15th president of the United States.

A member of the Huntingdon Lodge of the Freemasons, who had risen to the levels of Grand Master of his lodge and Deputy Grand Master of the Masonic district in which his lodge was located, his candidacy received intense scrutiny from his opponents, many of whom were members of the Anti-Masonic Party.

After years of Anti-Masonic "witch hunts," however, many prospective voters had tired of the vitriol, giving Porter an opening to effect change. He won the election with a slim 5,500-voter margin. The election result was bitterly contested by Ritner's supporters to the point of violence. Known as the "Buckshot War", Governor Ritner began making plans in Harrisburg to order military intervention to ensure the peaceful transition of government, but members of the legislature worked together to reach consensus and certified the election results before the situation could escalate further, bringing the conflict to an end a few days before Porter's inauguration. A large crowd attended his inaugural ceremonies on January 15, 1839.

When he assumed office, Porter faced the difficulties of a statewide recession that had begun in 1837 and a state bureaucracy that had spent heavily during the previous years. He pushed for, and then obtained, a tax on persons in professions and the trades similar to the state's income tax, and also secured Pennsylvania's first capital stock share tax while reducing state spending and hiring. Despite these financial changes, his administration was able to continue the state's expansion of its canal and railroad systems, including efforts to connect those systems to the Mississippi River and St. Louis, Missouri, as well as state capitals in Illinois, Indiana and Ohio.

In 1840, Porter called a special session of the legislature "for consideration of certain financial matters of the Commonwealth."

Porter then easily won re-election in 1841, defeating John Banks, the first Whig gubernatorial candidate to run without having to form a coalition with the Anti-Masonic Party. During his Inaugural Address on January 18, 1842, Porter recalled the state's financial difficulties and presented an overview of his plan for his second term:

"The public debt is substantially the same,—the public burdens only increased to meet obligations then incurred—the public improvements are more productive, and the public revenues essentially augmented. Our banking system, then tottering to its fall, has been examined with searching scrutiny by the public eye—its faults have been detected, its unsoundness exposed, and its dangers guarded against by the dissemination of correct information. The wild and headlong spirit of speculation has been checked. The undue multiplication of the public debt has been restrained, and improvident and wasteful expenditures of the public funds arrested. Experience has painfully demonstrated to the conviction of all, what the sagacious foresight of some apprehended—that nations, like individuals, when they make 'too great haste to get rich' are in danger of bankruptcy and ruin. We had not yet fortunately, reached the fatal point, from which there was no prospect of escape; but we were verging so near, as to render our rescue alike timely and perilous. Cases of individual hardship no doubt exist; patience, industry and enterprise will effect a cure in most of them; and for those that are remediless, we can but express our sympathy and sorrow.... The Commonwealth, herself, after a short struggle borne with fortitude characteristic of her citizens, and the integrity that they would scorn to tarnish, will overcome all her pecuniary difficulties—will faithfully fulfill her engagements and proudly maintain her honesty and her fame."

By the time Porter had begun that address in 1842, Pennsylvania's legislature had already begun what would become one of the longest sessions in state history, during which it took up the review and debate of a one-mill real estate and personal property tax increase that was pushed by Porter. Lasting two hundred and four calendar days, that session ran from January 4 to July 26. After it was over, Porter signed the new tax increase into effect.

Porter's second term also saw legislative action which abolished the practice of imprisoning people for not paying their debts, as well as the Philadelphia nativist riots of 1844, during which Porter sent in state military troops to quell anti-Catholic violence.

During Porter's two terms of executive leadership, Pennsylvania's total debt rose twenty-five percent, but the state was able to pay off the interest on that debt by using revenues that had been generated during his tenure. In addition, he was able to curtail efforts by some General Assembly members to redefine constitutional separations between the executive, judicial and legislative branches of the state's government.

As his second term wound down, Porter decided to retire from politics because Pennsylvania's revised state constitution prohibited him from seeking a third term and because he had developed increasingly difficult relations with both his own party, which opposed his support of protective tariffs, and members of the assembly who had tried to impeach him.

Returning to the private sector, where he resumed his iron manufacturing business in 1844, he oversaw construction of the first anthracite coal furnace for iron in south central Pennsylvania and operated his own railroad, which linked his furnace to Pennsylvania's larger railroad and canal lines. He then endorsed James Buchanan during his 1856 run for president of the United States.

Porter also subsequently helped to promote the extension of the transcontinental railroad through Texas, becoming an associate in the incorporation of the New Mexican Railway Company in 1860.

A vocal opponent of the secession of southern states from the Union, Porter's views were shared by his son, Horace Porter, who distinguished himself in battle during the American Civil War, first as a lieutenant colonel and then as a general. As aide-de-camp to General Grant, the younger Porter was present to witness the surrender of General Lee, and later wrote a book that has been described as the definitive account of the events at Appomattox Court House.

== Illness, death and interment ==
Falling ill after attending a church meeting in Harrisburg during the winter of 1866-1867, Porter's health continued to decline over a period of several months. He died on August 6, 1867, at the age of 78, and was buried in the Harrisburg Cemetery.

== Legacy ==
Portersville, Pennsylvania, originally named Stewartsville, is believed to have been renamed in honor of Governor Porter when the town applied for a post office between 1826-1828. However, Porter was not sworn into office until 1839, and he is the first (and only) of his namesake to serve as Governor of Pennsylvania.

Porter Street in Philadelphia is named in his honor. His grandson William Wagener Porter was a prominent Philadelphia attorney and legal author.

Party political offices
Preceded by Henry A. P. Muhlenberg	Democratic nominee for Governor of Pennsylvania; 1838, 1841	Succeeded by Francis R. Shunk
Pennsylvania House of Representatives
Preceded by	Member of the Pennsylvania House of Representatives; 1819-1823	Succeeded by
Pennsylvania State Senate
Preceded by John Harper	Member of the Pennsylvania Senate, 8th district 1836–1838	Succeeded by Isaac Slenker
Political offices
Preceded by Joseph Ritner	Governor of Pennsylvania; 1839–1845	Succeeded by Francis R. Shunk
