= Andrew Porter (Revolutionary War officer) =

American war officer (1743–1812)

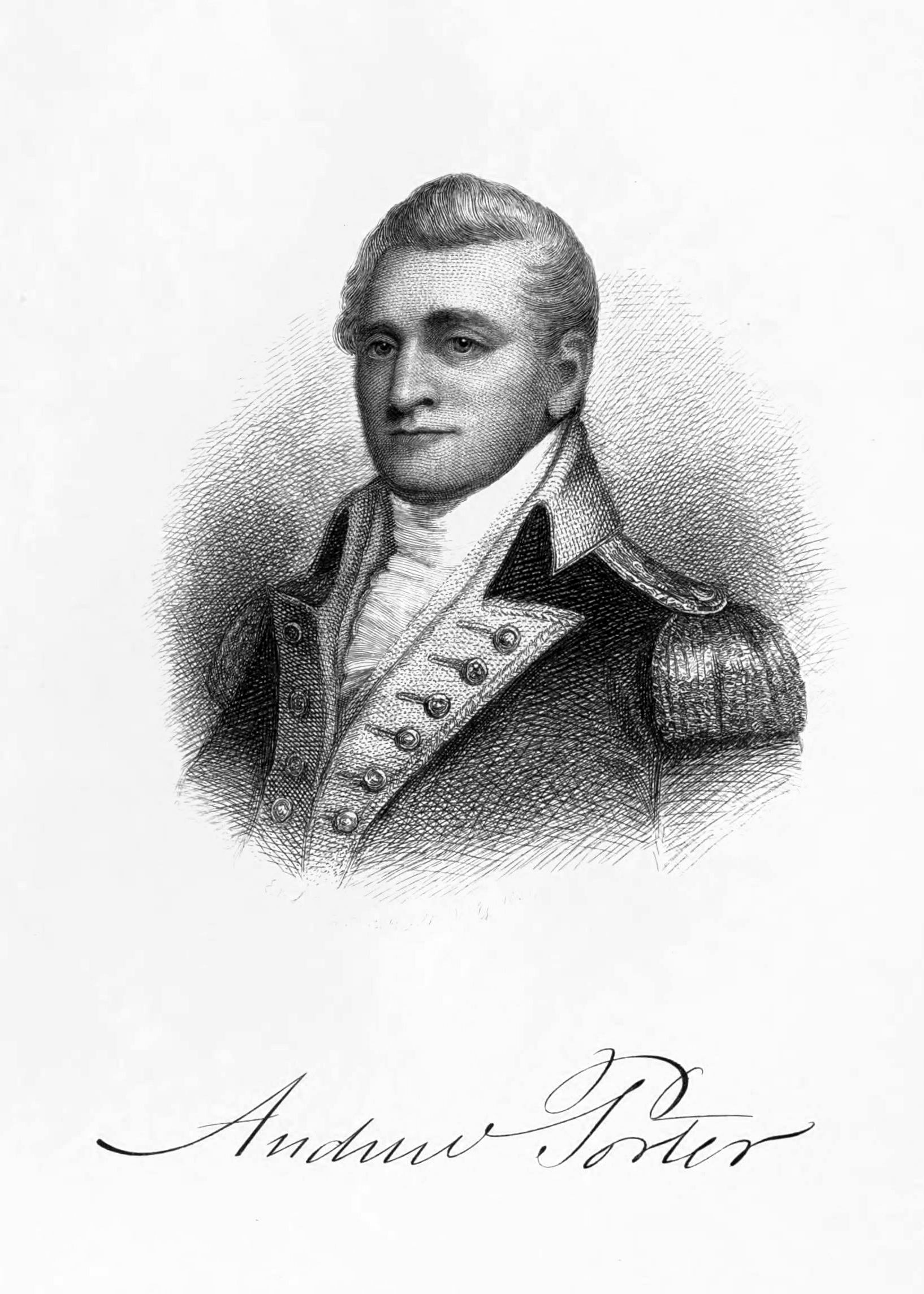
- Born: September 24, 1743; Norristown, Pennsylvania, U.S.
- Died: November 16, 1812 (aged 69); Harrisburg, Pennsylvania, U.S.
- Spouse(s): Elizabeth McDowell; Eliza Parker
- Children: 13, including George, David, James
- Relatives: Horace Porter (grandson); Andrew Porter (grandson); Mary Todd Lincoln (great-granddaughter)
- Military career
- Allegiance: United States
- Branch: Continental Marines, Continental Army
- Rank: Colonel
- Conflicts: Battle of Trenton; Battle of Princeton; Battle of Brandywine; Battle of Germantown; Tioga Point
- Other work: Pennsylvania surveyor-general

Pennsylvania Historical Marker
- Type: Roadside
- Criteria: American Revolution, Military
- Designated: March 11, 1949
- Location: W. Main & Selma Sts., Norristown
- Marker Text: Revolutionary War officer; surveyor of western and northern State boundaries, 1784-87; Surveyor-General, 1809-13. Born near here, 1743; died at Harrisburg, 1813. His home, "Selma," is marked, a block distant.

Andrew Porter (September 24, 1743 – November 16, 1813) was an American officer during the Revolutionary War.

== Early life ==
Porter was born on September 24, 1743, at Norriton, his father's farm near Norristown, Pennsylvania. He was one of the fourteen children of Robert Porter (1698–1770) and Lileous (née Christy) Porter (1708–1771). His father had immigrated from Derry, Ireland, to the Province of New Hampshire in 1720, and later moved to Pennsylvania.

== Career ==
Porter moved to Philadelphia as a young man, where he became a schoolmaster and amateur astronomer. In 1776, he joined the American forces in the Revolutionary War as a captain of marines. He later moved to the artillery, in which branch he served at the battles of Trenton, Princeton, Brandywine, Germantown, and Tioga Point. He was later directed by General George Washington to supervise the preparation of artillery ammunition for the Siege of Yorktown. By the end of the war, he had been promoted to the rank of colonel.

=== Post Revolutionary War ===
After the end of the war, Porter continued to serve in a military role with the Pennsylvania militia, rising to the rank of major general. He also served as the state's surveyor-general, and was one of the commissioners tasked with determining the boundaries between Pennsylvania, Virginia, and Ohio.

He was offered the position of Brigadier general in the U.S. Army, at the end of the War, and United States Secretary of War by President Madison, but he declined both due to his advanced age.

== Personal life ==
Porter was married twice, first to Elizabeth McDowell (1747–1773), with whom he had five children, including:

- Robert Porter (1768–1842), who married Sarah Williams (1775–1816)
- Elizabeth Rittenhouse Porter (1769–1850), who married Robert Porter Parker (1760–1800) and was the grandmother of Mary Todd Lincoln.

After the death of his first wife, he remarried to Eliza Parker (1750–1821), with whom he had eight more children, including:

- Charlotte Porter (1778–1850), who married Robert Brooke of Virginia
- David Rittenhouse Porter (1788–1867), Governor of Pennsylvania
- Harriett Porter (1788–1864), who married Thomas McKeen (1763–1858)
- George Bryan Porter (1791–1834), Governor of the Michigan Territory
- James Madison Porter (1793–1862), Secretary of War under President John Tyler

Porter died on November 16, 1813, in Harrisburg, Pennsylvania.

Porter Township, Huntingdon County, Pennsylvania, formed in 1814 is named for Porter.

=== Descendants ===
His grandson through his son David, Horace Porter (1837–1921), was a Union general in the American Civil War who served as aide-de-camp to General Grant and later U.S. Ambassador to France. He is also a Medal of Honor Recipient.

His grandson through his son George was Andrew Porter (1820–1872), also a brigadier general in the Union during the American Civil War who was an important staff officer under George B. McClellan during the 1862 Peninsula Campaign, serving as the Provost Marshal of the Army of the Potomac.

Through his daughter Elizabeth, he was the great-grandfather of Mary Todd Lincoln, the wife of 16th President Abraham Lincoln.
