= Norristown Academy =

- Norristown, Montgomery County, Pennsylvania; United States

Information
- Established: 1805
- Closed: 1829

Norristown Academy was a private preparatory academy established in 1805 in Norristown, Pennsylvania. Many prominent people have been educated there, including Major General Winfield Scott Hancock, Governor David Rittenhouse Porter, James Madison Porter, and Samuel Medary. It was torn down in 1829.
