= Andrew Porter (Civil War general) =

United States Army general (1820–1872)

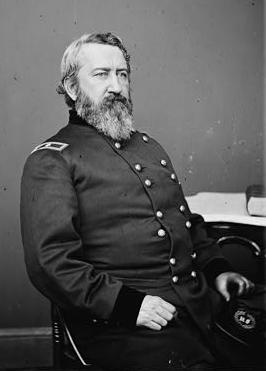
- Born: July 10, 1820; Lancaster, Pennsylvania, US
- Died: January 3, 1872 (aged 51); Paris, France
- Burial place: Elmwood Cemetery, Detroit
- Spouse: Margaretta Falconer Biddle
- Military career
- Allegiance: United States of America; Union
- Branch: United States Army; Union Army
- Service years: 1846–1864
- Rank: Brigadier General
- Commands: Provost Marshal General of the Army of the Potomac
- Conflicts: Mexican–American War; American Civil War: • First Battle of Bull Run • Peninsula Campaign

Andrew Porter (July 10, 1820 – January 3, 1872) was an American army officer who was a brigadier general in the Union Army during the American Civil War. He was an important staff officer under George B. McClellan during the 1862 Peninsula Campaign, serving as the Provost Marshal of the Army of the Potomac.

== Early life ==
Porter was born in Lancaster, Pennsylvania, on July 10, 1820. He was the son of Sarah Humes and George Bryan Porter (1791–1834), a governor of the Michigan Territory.

He was a grandson of Revolutionary War officer Andrew Porter and a second cousin of Mary Todd Lincoln. His younger first cousin, Horace Porter (1837–1921), also served as a Union general and later as the U.S. Ambassador to France. He attended the United States Military Academy at West Point, New York, for six months in 1836 and 1837.

== Career ==
=== Mexican–American War ===
He served in the Mexican–American War as a first lieutenant in the 1st Mounted Rifles. Within a year, he was promoted to captain and cited for gallantry, being brevetted two grades to lieutenant colonel. Porter spent the next fourteen years serving at various posts and forts on the frontier. He fought a duel in Texas with future Confederate general James J. Archer, whose second was Thomas J. Jackson, later "Stonewall" Jackson.

=== Civil War ===
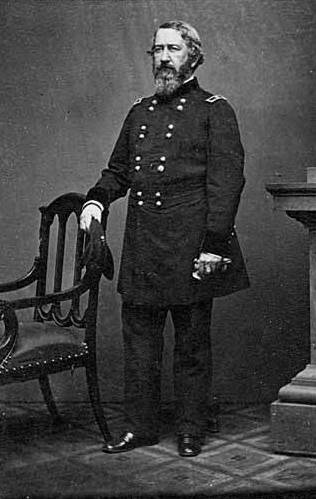
Porter in 1862 Mathew Brady photo

On the outbreak of the Civil War he was serving as a colonel of the 16th U.S. Infantry. He was appointed as a brigadier general in May 1861, and commanded the 1st Brigade, 2nd Division at First Battle of Bull Run. He served as Provost Marshal of the District of Columbia, and was then appointed as Provost Marshal General of the Army of the Potomac in the Peninsula Campaign. In April 1864 he mustered out for health reasons.

A photo of Porter by Mathew Brady circa 1862 survives.

== Personal life ==
Porter married Margaretta Falconer (Margarite) Biddle (1825–1913) of the Biddle family. She was the daughter of John Biddle (1792–1859), a military officer and Michigan politician. Her nephew was John Biddle (1859–1936), who became Superintendent of the United States Military Academy. Together, they were the parents of John Biddle Porter (1858–1915).

Porter moved to Paris, France, in an attempt to improve his health. However, he died at his home there in 1872, and his remains were returned to the United States for burial in Elmwood Cemetery in Detroit.

=== Honors ===
Reflecting a post-Civil War pattern of naming many Washington, DC streets in newly developed areas in the Capital after Union generals, an east-west street in the Northwest quadrant is named Porter Street, NW.

== See also ==
- List of American Civil War generals (Union)

== Sources ==
- Eicher, John H., and Eicher, David J., Civil War High Commands, Palo Alto, California: Stanford University Press, 2001, ISBN 0-8047-3641-3.
- Heidler, David S., and Heidler, Jeanne T., eds., Encyclopedia of the American Civil War: A Political, Social, and Military History, W. W. Norton & Company, 2000, ISBN 0-393-04758-X.
- Warner, Ezra J., Generals in Blue: Lives of the Union Commanders, Louisiana State University Press, 1964, ISBN 0-8071-0822-7.
- U.S. War Department, The War of the Rebellion: a Compilation of the Official Records of the Union and Confederate Armies, U.S. Government Printing Office, 1880–1901.
