= James Madison Porter =

American politician (1793–1862)

James Porter
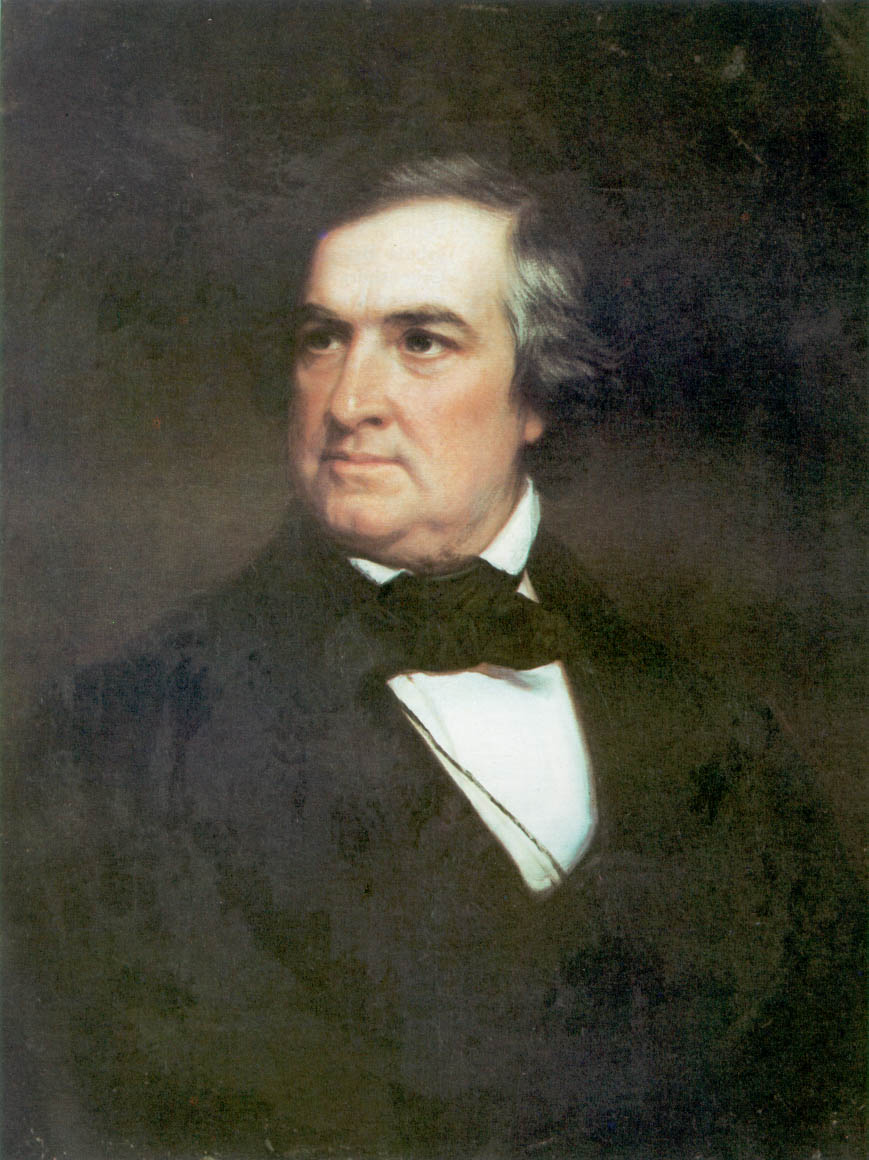
- 1874 portrait

President Judge of the 22nd Judicial District for Wayne County, Pike County, Monroe County and Carbon County
- In office 1853–1855

Member of the Pennsylvania House of Representatives
- In office 1849–1850

18th United States Secretary of War
- In office March 8, 1843 – January 30, 1844
- President: John Tyler
- Preceded by: John Spencer
- Succeeded by: William Wilkins

Personal details
- Born: January 6, 1793 Norristown, Pennsylvania, U.S.
- Died: November 11, 1862 (aged 69) Easton, Pennsylvania, U.S.
- Party: Democratic
- Spouse: Eliza Michler

Military service
- Years of service: 1809-1818
- Battles/wars: War of 1812

James Madison Porter (January 6, 1793 – November 11, 1862) was an American politician who served as the 18th United States Secretary of War and a founder of Lafayette College.

Porter began his career studying law in 1809 and later became a clerk in the prothonotary's office in an effort to manage a volunteer militia company at Fort Mifflin. Porter was admitted to the bar in 1813 and later appointed to attorney general for Northampton County, Pennsylvania. He was a professor of jurisprudence and political economy at Lafayette College (1837-1852), a judge of the twelfth judicial district (1839), ad interim U.S. Secretary of War under President John Tyler (1843), and was elected as a member of the Pennsylvania House of Representatives in 1849.

== Early life and education ==
James Madison Porter was born on January 6, 1793, in Norristown, Pennsylvania at his father's estate known as Selma. He was the son of General Andrew Porter and Elizabeth Parker Porter, and was the youngest of thirteen children. James and his older brother, Judge Robert Porter, were home schooled during their early years and later attended Norristown Academy to continue their adolescent education.

== Career ==
=== Military service ===
Porter began his military career in 1809 as an office clerk at the request of his father, who served as the Surveyor General of Pennsylvania at the time. His time spent as an office clerk proved to be beneficial in allowing him to acquire the knowledge that would lead him to enter the law office of John Passmore, Esquire. Porter was settled in Philadelphia in 1813 when rumors spread across the city that the British were coming during the War of 1812. Porter took matters into his own hands and organized militia units along the Delaware River. Although the British never arrived, the people of Philadelphia applauded his efforts. His military service ceased upon his arrival in Easton, Pennsylvania in 1818, but resumed in 1843 when President John Tyler appointed him Secretary of War. President John Tyler named Porter his secretary ad interim, hoping that after time, the Senate would approve Porter's nomination. However, Porter served in the Cabinet only eleven months because the Senate did not confirm his nomination. This arose due to President Tyler's troubled relationship with the Senate in previous years. President Tyler had offended the Whigs with his independent nomination and upon hearing of the Senate's action, Porter immediately resigned his commission and returned to Easton.

=== Business career ===
Although primarily remembered for his political and educational achievements, James Madison Porter had a successful track record in business as well. He was the first president of the Delaware, Lehigh, Schuylkill, and Susquehanna Railroad that was charted in 1847 and became the Lehigh Valley Railroad in 1853. Moreover, although he was up for reelection in 1856 when the company was moving to Philadelphia, he chose to decline the offer. Porter was also the president of the Belvidere Delaware Railroad company, which is now part of the Pennsylvania Railroad, and the Easton Delaware Bridge Company. Under his administration, the original line opened in 1855. It stretched from Easton to Mauch Chunk, a region now known as Jim Thorpe. Additionally, Porter was invested in the natural resource industry. He organized a company called Northampton Quarry Company in 1817 in order to purchase and work a slate quarry near the bank of the Delaware River in Upper Mount Bethel County. By the 1830s, the company had expanded its reach and was renamed the Pennsylvania Slate Company. Additionally, Porter had similar investments in limestone quarries, coal mines, and a few mines involving the extraction of iron ore. Furthermore, Porter was involved in two commercial endeavors. He founded the savings bank known as the Dime Savings Institute of Easton that flourished for a few years until it was incorporated into a larger regional bank, and he was an originator of the Farmers' and Mechanics' Institute of Easton that was designed to advance the agricultural and mechanical arts.

=== Political career ===
Porter came to Easton in 1818 to serve as the deputy attorney general for Northampton County. He was very involved in handling the civil and murder cases of the community. In 1838, Porter was elected a member of the body of the Pennsylvania General Assembly to help reform the state constitution. Though not elected presiding officer, his role as chairman of the Committee on the Bill of Rights put him in a position to express his opinions. He maintained a political viewpoint that was conservative to moderate. In 1839, his brother David Rittenhouse Porter was elected governor for the Democratic ballot. In the same year, David appointed James as President Judge for the state district of Dauphin, Schuylkill and Lebanon counties. A recess appointment to the office of Secretary of War, Porter was never confirmed by the Senate, receiving only three favorable votes. After serving in Washington, D.C. under President Tyler for eleven months as Secretary of War, Porter was elected to the Pennsylvania House of Representatives in 1849. However, Porter left the legislature after only one year. From 1853 to 1855, he served as President Judge of the twenty-second judicial district that included Wayne, Pike, Monroe and Carbon counties. Porter's political career came to end when he was asked to retire at age 63 due to health concerns.

=== Founding of Lafayette College ===
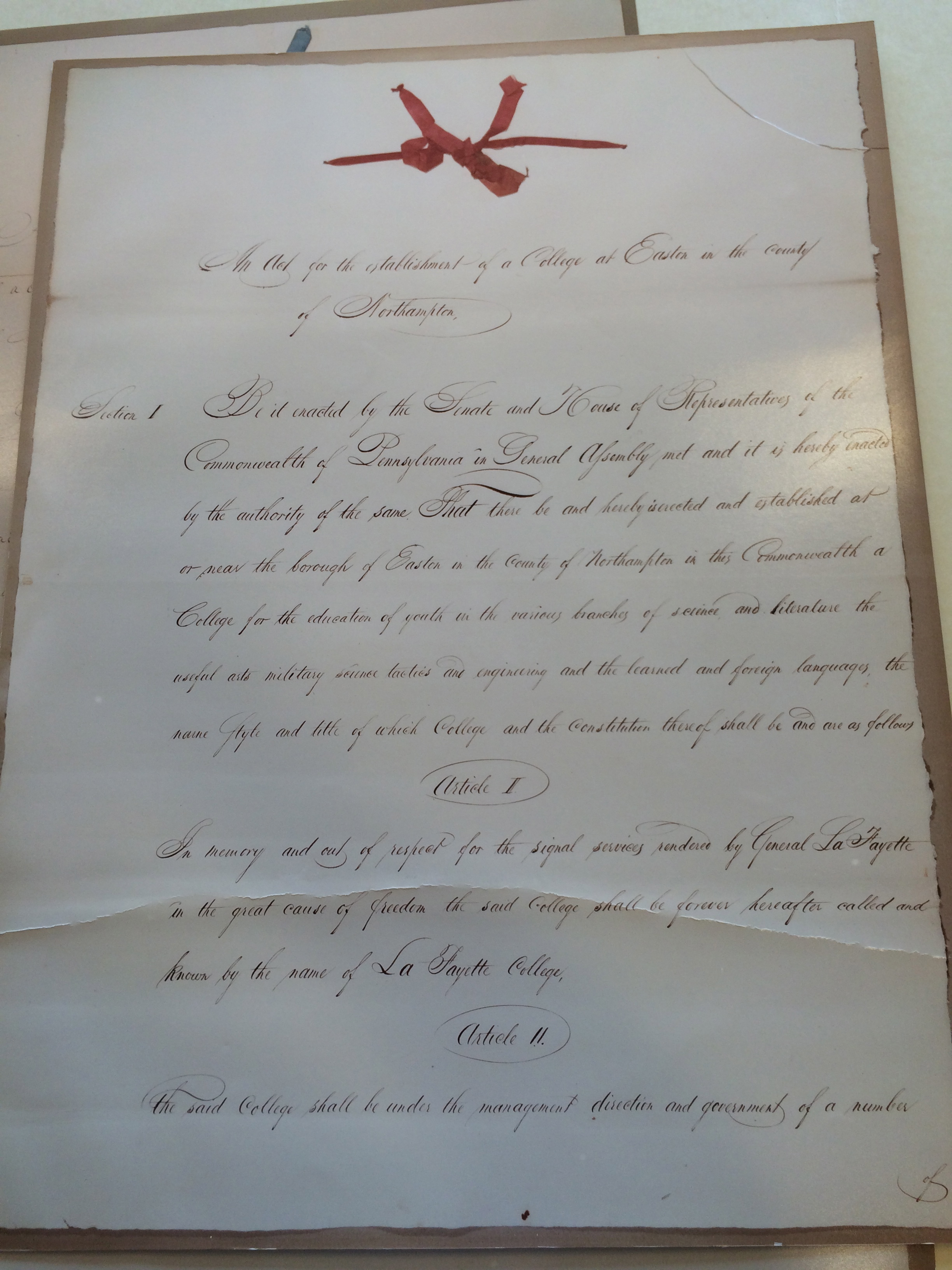
A copy of the original charter of Lafayette College

The borough (now city) of Easton in the mid-1700s and early 1800s did not see much success in building a sound educational system. Easton built its first school in 1755, and though seeing some classes of students graduate, the school closed in 1798. In 1784, there was a desire to build an academy for young students called the Easton Union Academy. Though it was chartered in 1794 by the trustees of the Union Academy, the school was unable to grow. The academy struggled with infrastructural upkeep and maintaining a cohort of teachers willing to provide instruction to students. In 1824, the academy closed and the School Board of Easton took over the property.

General Lafayette's visit to America in 1824-1825 inspired the citizens of Easton. A group of 200 citizens traveled to Philadelphia on Wednesday, September 22 to meet Lafayette. Porter engaged in a positive exchange with Lafayette about Porter's family legacy and stories of war. Enlightened, Porter traveled to Norwich University and Dartmouth College, where he first got the idea to establish a college in Easton. Despite previous efforts to establish educational institutions in the borough, Porter advocated Easton's ability to sustain a college, saying that, "Easton was 'rich and flourishing' in men, in location, in resources, and in prospects. There was every reason to believe that a college established by the 'combined efforts of its citizens' would succeed."

The newspaper, The Centinal, printed an advertisement calling for Easton citizens to attend a meeting on December 27, 1824, at the Easton Hotel to discuss the potential for building a college. At the meeting, led by Porter, the assembly discussed the ability for a college to thrive in Easton, saying that, "It was emphasized that the academy, which had undertaken only secondary education, had failed because it was dependent purely on local patronage and was subject to all the whims and prejudices of the neighborhood, whereas an institution of higher learning would attract students from a wide area and would therefore be independent of these local factors". Porter emphasized the importance of teaching military science to prepare young men for war and inspire leadership. He also stressed the importance of teaching the German language because of the heritage of the majority of the population in Easton. Soon after, Porter, along with assembly members Joel Jones and Jacob Wagener, drafted a charter for the college to be sent for legislative approval.

On December 6, 1825, the Pennsylvania House of Representatives met to review the proposed charter. The charter was referred to the Committee on Education as Bill Number 12, who intensely debated the bill. After much deliberation, the bill was passed by the House one month later on January 6, 1826, with three provisions made that limited the power of the college, allowed those practicing any religion to be associated with the college, and allowed legislature to revoke the charter if deemed necessary. The bill was proposed to the Pennsylvania Senate on January 16, 1826, and again faced opposition. Some senators opposed the teaching of military science, believing it would inspire a war-like attitude in the students. After two months of discussion, the charter was approved by the Senate on March 7, 1829. Two days later, Governor of Pennsylvania J. Andrew Shulze approved the charter, and Lafayette College came into legal existence.

Several men joined Porter in his efforts to establish a college in Easton, including:

- Samuel Sitgreaves, a lawyer who served as a member of the Fourth and Fifth Congresses
- Colonel Thomas McKeen, a commissioned colonel of the Pennsylvania State Militia
- Joel Jones, the 141st mayor of Philadelphia and the first president of Girard College
- Colonel Christian Jacob Hutter, the founder of The Centinal and several other publications in Easton
- Thomas J. Rogers, a writer and Pennsylvania state senator who established The Northampton Farmer and Easton Weekly Advertiser

These men joined Porter in Easton and on his journey to Philadelphia to meet General Lafayette. Other men involved in the process were Jacob Wagener, Jacob Weygandt, Jr., William Shouse, Philip Mixsell, John Bowes, Peter Miller, Philip H. Mattes, John Carey, John R. Lattimore, Peter S. Michler, and Joseph K. Smith.

== Speeches and addresses ==
=== 1837 speech to Convention of Pennsylvania on Right to Annul Charters of Incorporation ===
Porter delivered this speech on November 20, 1837, in Philadelphia. Porter began by referencing a, "Mr. Doran," of Philadelphia County who had originally offered a proposal stating that the state tax on real and personal property was to be repealed, as well as to charter a state bank to be named, "The United States Bank." He continued by stating that Mr. Doran's plan was not called up for second reading and consideration until the 18th day of November, 1837. Through the action of McCahen of Philadelphia County, the plan was passed with a vote of 53 to 50. Although Mr. Doran's plan was enacted, several other plans were proposed prior to Porter's speech. Porter moved forward in his speech by stating that he disagrees with a previous proposal given by a certain, "Mr. Meredith." Meredith had proposed the following options:

1)"That it is the sense of this convention that contracts made on the faith of the Commonwealth are, and of right ought to be, inviolable."

2)"That it is the sense of this Convention that a charter duly granted by an act of Assembly is, when accepted, a contract with the parties to whom the grant is made."

In his address, Porter stated that he did not believe the proposal to be correct in principle, stating that all charters of incorporation should not be beyond legislative control. He further stated that the nature of all contracts are to be subject to the supervision of the Legislature which, "has the power to alter, re-model, and repeal the same as the exigencies of the State and a regard for the public good may require." Porter then continued by stating that the proposal was only applicable in the case of private corporation affairs where a charter is a contract and cannot be changed by any other corporations without the consent of the original private corporation.

Porter then shifted his speech to the topic of large corporations and monopolies. He addressed the convention by stating that the state of Pennsylvania, and businessmen in general, should be careful to guard against the dangers of the intentions of monopolies, and large businesses. He stated that, "it may be wise and salutary, and perhaps it may essentially aid us in arriving at sound and correct conclusions, to inquire into the origin, progress, uses and tendencies of corporations." Stating that a corporation is no more than an artificial being, Porter expressed his idea that a corporation's intentions should be nothing more than what its charter defines. Porter then outlined several examples of how corporations in early Italy sought nothing but to grow in size, even at the expense of smaller businesses, and how these corporations eventually gained more power in national affairs than was appropriate. Porter believed in the rights of the individual citizen, as opposed to the rights of the larger corporations. Towards the end of his speech, Porter stated that the convention should mark his words that, "If ever our republic fails, it will be by the destruction of the confidence of our citizens in the security of their individual rights."

=== 1832 address to Literary Societies of Lafayette College ===
Porter gave this address on July 4, 1832, as the current president of the board of trustees of Lafayette College. Porter began by calling into memory the brave General Lafayette after which the college is named, and expressed his beliefs of future success for the college. Recalling a certain degree of nationalism expressed by Americans during the American Revolution, Porter stated that our Declaration of Independence was a quintessential expression of the American ideal.

... the adoption of the resolution to sever the cord that bound us to Britain – The Declaration of Independence – the toil, the blood, the labor and the treasure expended in the consummation of our revolution – the enduring and devoted patriotism that amid all the gloom and despondency of its worst periods bore up our citizens under adversity.

Porter continued with his address by stating that ignorant and uneducated individuals can never be "free" (referring to American freedom) and that an educated people will never be enslaved to an oppressive government. Porter then stated that it is because of institutions like Lafayette that the American people might become educated and informed. Giving a brief history of the college, Porter continued by stating that the charter of Lafayette College was granted by legislature in 1826, and was not aided or endowed by the Commonwealth. He also gave a brief statement of how the college was first a military institution prior to becoming a liberal arts college. The next major segment of Porter's speech covered the role of Lafayette's current, and future students. Porter stated that the student body was of an age where "youth is buoyant." It is because of this youthful mindset that Porter believed young people are not always ready to make the most of their time, stating that "(the youth are) ... not always sufficiently convinced of the necessity of improving the passing hours." Porter then stated that it is because of Lafayette College, and other colleges akin to Lafayette's academic standard and ideals, that the student body would be successful, and become, "ornaments of society." Porter explained the importance of constant intellectual stimulation as a fundamental building block towards adulthood, but also touched upon the importance of physical fitness as another fundamental necessity. Porter believed that intellectual and physical fitness should not be mutually exclusive, "... he who has accomplished the greatest amount of physical labor in the three hours, per day, devoted to manual and agricultural pursuits, has, with scarcely an exception, made the greatest mental progress."

Porter finished his speech with a final statement on the sciences. Asking those students who were, "blessed with brilliant minds," to remember the allegory of the Hill of Science; a strong work ethic will overcome the brilliant, but lazy. He stated that the image of Lafayette College was directly associated with the image of its student body, and that, "much of the reputation of any college depends on the attainments and characters of its graduates." Porter's final statements outlined the students' journey towards the "active scenes" of life. He made sure to stress that the student body should carry with them morals and unbending integrity.

=== 1835 address to the Mechanics of Easton, Pennsylvania ===
Porter delivered this address on July 4, 1835. He began his address with a philosophical overtone, describing the rational faculties of man. Porter stated that man is only able to conceive of rational thought from existing rational thought; the same holds true for perceptions of objects. Porter then expressed his discontent towards the mental ability of man, stating, "... without the aid of divine revelation, how utterly incapable is the mind of man, much we boast of its powers ..." Although Porter was skeptical of the mental capability of man, he did acknowledge the intellectual prowess of a select few individuals in the earlier time period of mankind. Moving on to the subject of religion, Porter stated that religion has actually aided learning throughout even the earliest of monastic systems. He stated that the re-printing of the Bible aided in the expansion of intellectual curiosity and ideas, and that the German people benefitted the most from this re-printing of the Bible.

Porter then moved his speech forward by speaking about the influence of other works on the intellectual stimulation of mankind, "But the influence which Letters, originating in Egypt and thence introduced to Greece, Italy and the rest of the world, have exercised and are continuing to exercise over the habits, manners and destinies of mankind ..." Porter believed that a society that had been educated entirely, without an educated "elite," is a society that is commended by all the motives of piety, morality, and patriotism. Porter stated that the piety of an intelligent community as well as its morality is of a "purer and more lofty" character than among the uninformed. He used the example of the early New England settlers and their union on the soil of America to further his point "... at once presented the singular phenomenon of a society containing neither lords nor common people, neither rich nor poor ... These men possessed, in proportion to their numbers a greater mass of intelligence than is found in any European nation of our own time." Porter believed that a generally educated society is one that is on an inevitable road to success.

Porter began then final portions of his address by further stressing the importance of general education, specifically in the state of Pennsylvania. He stated that since the inchoate stages of Pennsylvania's development, the state had prioritized education as a tenet of success, "Our constitutional injunctions have been followed by repeated legislative enactments, until we have a system in operation which places the means of education within the reach of every member of the community." The quest for universal education for the people of early Pennsylvania was an undertaking that Porter gave great respect.

== Death and legacy ==
On November 11, 1862, Porter died at his home in Easton, Pennsylvania at the age of 69. He is buried in Easton Cemetery alongside his wife, Eliza, who died on March 2, 1866.

The Porter Society, a scholarship at the college, was founded at Lafayette College in 1997 in honor of Porter.

== See also ==
- Unsuccessful nominations to the Cabinet of the United States

Political offices
Preceded by John Spencer	United States Secretary of War; 1843–1844	Succeeded by William Wilkins
