= Home rule municipality (Pennsylvania) =

Form of government of municipality

In the U.S. commonwealth of Pennsylvania, a home rule municipality is one incorporated under its own unique charter, created pursuant to the state's home rule and optional plans law and approved by referendum. "Local governments without home rule can only act where specifically authorized by state law; home rule municipalities can act anywhere except where they are specifically limited by state law". Although many such municipalities have retained the word "Township" or "Borough" in their official names, the Pennsylvania Township and Borough Codes no longer apply to them. All three types of municipalities (cities, boroughs, and townships) may become a home rule municipality.

== History of home rule in Pennsylvania ==
When Pennsylvania was chartered in 1681, its proprietor William Penn was given the power to create counties, towns, and other municipalities, and the legislature was given sovereignty over them. "Abuse of legislative interference in local matters in the nineteenth century led to prohibition of special and local laws in the Constitution of 1874". Early in the 20th century, the concept of municipal home rule spread across the United States, and in 1922 the Pennsylvania Constitution was amended to give the legislature the right to grant cities the right to choose home rule. Philadelphia became the first home rule city of Pennsylvania in 1951. The Assembly further adopted the Optional Third Class City Charter Law in 1957, and in 1968, the new Constitution declared that "Municipalities shall have the right and power to frame and adopt home rule charters." The new Home Rule Charter and Optional Plans Law, creating that right in the statutes of the Commonwealth, was passed in 1972.

== Where to find charters ==
Home rule charters are published in the Pennsylvania Code in titles numbered in the 300s, by county. However, Norristown's published charter in the Montgomery County title of the Pennsylvania code (specifically Title 346) is an obsolete version, as the revised version was never published in the code.

== See also ==
- List of Pennsylvania municipalities and counties with home rule charters, optional charters, or optional plans
- Philadelphia Home Rule Charter Reform Campaign
