= Abandoned and Blighted Property Conservatorship Act =

The Abandoned and Blighted Property Conservatorship Act (Act 135) is a Pennsylvania law that enables nonprofits and individuals to petition a court to be appointed “conservators” of properties they allege to be blighted and abandoned.

== Background on Act 135 ==
The Pennsylvania legislature passed Act 135 in 2008. The act established property conservatorship as a mechanism to address blight. The act was designed to provide community members with standing to petition for the right to rehabilitate and take ownership of abandoned properties.

=== 2014 Amendment ===
Pennsylvania legislators amended the legislation in October 2014. Representative John Taylor introduced the amendments, arguing that they would make conservatorship more attractive to private developers.

== Provisions ==
Under the law, in order for the court to appoint a conservator, the petitioner must show that all of the following apply as of the date of filing:

- The building has not been legally occupied for at least the previous 12 months.
- The owner fails to present compelling evidence that he has actively marketed the property during the preceding 60-day period and made a good faith effort to sell the property at a price which reflects the circumstances and market conditions.
- The property is not subject to a pending foreclosure action by an individual or nongovernmental entity.
- The current owner fails to present sufficient evidence that he has acquired the property within the preceding six months. The evidence shall not include instances where the prior owner is a member of the immediate family of the current owner, unless the transfer of title results from the death of the prior owner, or where the current or prior owner is a corporation, partnership or other entity in which either owner or the immediate family of either owner has an interest in excess of 5%.

== Unintended consequences ==
A study carried out by the Advocacy for Racial and Civil Justice Clinic at the University of Pennsylvania's school of law found that Act 135 petitions were "disproportionately filed in communities vulnerable to gentrification" and "disproportionately filed against Asian-American ... and to a lesser degree Black respondents."

A series of articles appearing in the Philadelphia Inquirer described how people at risk of displacement in challenging circumstances had lost their houses to conservatorships.
