= Samuel K. Zook =

Union Army officer in the American Civil War

Samuel Kurtz Zook
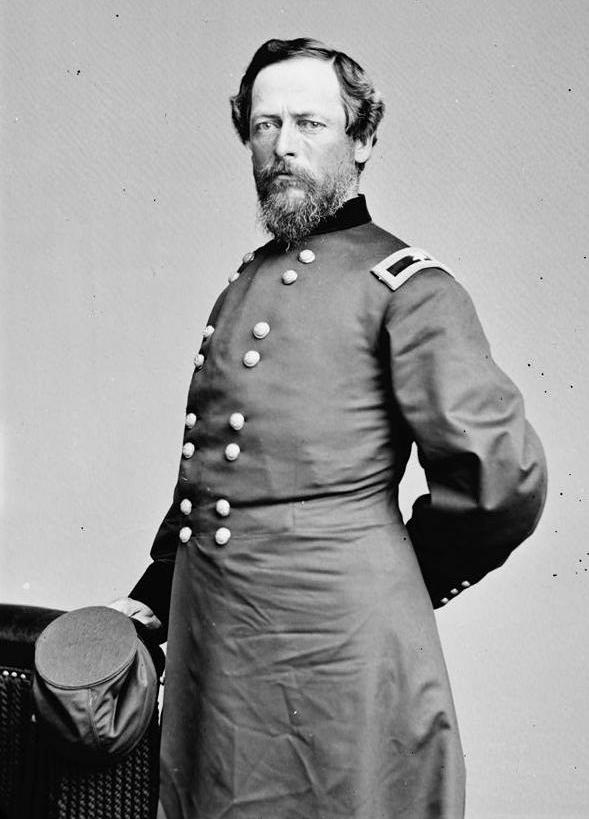
- Zook in the early 1860s
- Born: March 27, 1821; Tredyffrin Township, Pennsylvania, U.S.
- Died: July 3, 1863 (aged 42); Gettysburg, Pennsylvania, U.S.
- Burial place: Montgomery Cemetery (West Norriton Township, Pennsylvania, U.S.)
- Military career
- Allegiance: United States of America; Union
- Branch: United States Army; Union Army
- Service years: 1861–1863
- Rank: Brigadier General; Brevet Major General
- Commands: 57th New York Infantry Regiment; 3rd Brigade, 1st Division, II Corps
- Conflicts: American Civil War Seven Days Battles Battle of Fredericksburg Battle of Chancellorsville Battle of Gettysburg †

Samuel Kosciuszko Zook (born Samuel Kurtz Zook, March 27, 1821 – July 3, 1863) was a Union general during the American Civil War who was mortally wounded in action at the Battle of Gettysburg.

== Early years ==
Zook was born in Tredyffrin Township, Pennsylvania. His parents were David and Eleanor Stephens Zook and his paternal ancestors were of the Mennonite faith. At an early age, he moved with his parents to the home of his maternal grandmother at Valley Forge and the tradition of George Washington's winter encampment there during the American Revolutionary War fueled a lifelong interest in military matters. His father, David Zook, had been a major during the American Revolution, further fueling his interests. From the time he was old enough to carry a musket, he participated in local militia activities. At the age of 19, he became a lieutenant in the Pennsylvania militia and the adjutant of the 100th or 110th Pennsylvania regiment.

Zook entered the emerging field of telegraphy, became a proficient operator, and worked on crews to string wires as far west as the Mississippi River. He moved to New York City in 1846 or 1851 and became the superintendent of the Washington and New York Telegraph Company. He made several discoveries in electric science that helped establish his reputation. In New York City, he also joined the 6th New York Governor's Guard (militia) regiment and had achieved the rank of lieutenant colonel by the time the Civil War broke out.

== Civil War ==
The 6th New York Militia helped out as a 90-day regiment during the first summer of the war. Zook served as the military governor in Annapolis, seeking support from politically influential men there to achieve a regimental command of his own. After he was mustered out, he raised the 57th New York Infantry (National Guard Rifles) and became its colonel on October 19, 1861.

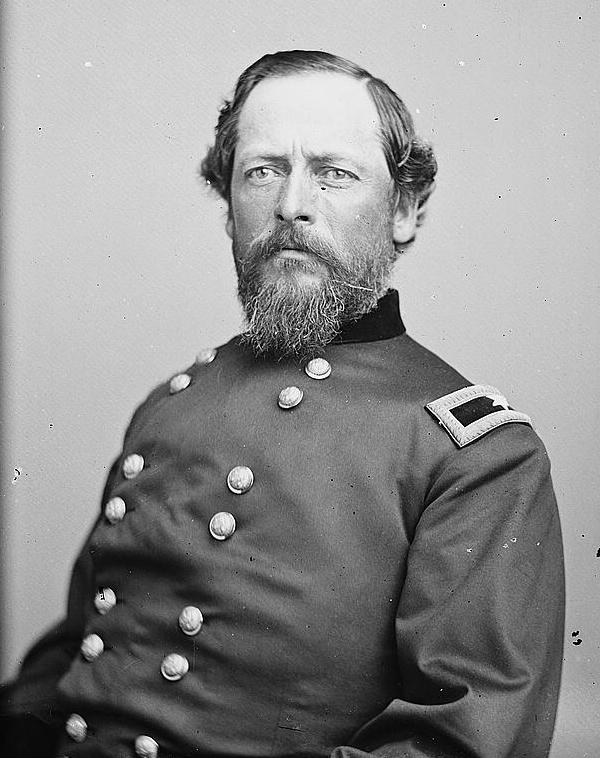
General Samuel K. Zook

Zook's first combat was during the Seven Days Battles of 1862. His regiment was assigned to William H. French's brigade in Edwin V. Sumner's division of the Army of the Potomac, under Maj. Gen. George B. McClellan. Zook was personally scouting far out in front of his regiment in the run-up to the Battle of Gaines' Mill, got behind enemy lines, and found that Confederate Maj. Gen. John B. Magruder was conducting an elaborate deception, making it appear that he had significantly more troops in his sector than he actually had. Zook's discovery was reported up to McClellan, but it was ignored, and Union troops that could have been used successfully elsewhere remained tied down.

=== Fredericksburg ===
Zook was forced to go on medical leave, probably due to chronic and disabling rheumatism, thus missing the Battle of Antietam. When he returned to the Army he was given command of French's brigade (3rd Brigade, 1st Division, II Corps) under division commander Maj. Gen. Winfield S. Hancock. The brigade was one of the first to arrive at Fredericksburg, Virginia, and he wanted to cross over the Rappahannock River as quickly as possible, before Confederate General Robert E. Lee could reinforce the town and the heights beyond it. However, Army of the Potomac commander Maj. Gen. Ambrose Burnside prevented the movement, wanting to wait for his army to concentrate and to receive pontoon bridges to make the river crossing. Zook wrote on December 10, "If we had had the pontoons promised when we arrived here we could have the hills on the other side of the river without cost over 50 men—now it will cost at least 10,000 if not more." While waiting for the pontoons to arrive, Zook served as military governor of Falmouth, Virginia.

When the Battle of Fredericksburg began in earnest on December 13, French's division was the first to assault Marye's Heights. After being repulsed with heavy losses, Hancock's division moved forward with Zook's brigade in the lead. Zook had his horse shot out from under him and was momentarily stunned, but managed to lead his men to within 60 yards of the Stone Wall, one of the farthest Union advances of the battle. His brigade suffered 527 of the 12,000 Union casualties that night. General Hancock praised Zook's attack for its "spirit". Zook wrote afterward, "Now by God, if I don't get my star, I'm coming home." He was promoted to brigadier general in March 1863, to rank from November 29, 1862. After the battle, Zook briefly assumed command of the division while Hancock was absent on leave. Despite his successful promotion, however, the Battle of Fredericksburg affected him deeply:

I walked over the field, close under the enemy's picket line, last night about 3 o'clock. The ground was strewn thickly with corpses of the hero's who perished there on Saturday. I never realized before what war was. I never before felt so horribly since I was born. To see men dashed to pieces by shot & torn into shreds by shells during the heat and crash of battle is bad enough God knows, but to walk alone amongst slaughtered brave in the "still small hours" of the night would make the bravest man living "blue". God grant I may never have to repeat my last night's experience.

— Samuel K. Zook, letter to E. I. Wade, December 16, 1862

At the Battle of Chancellorsville in May 1863, Zook's brigade fought in the defensive line around the Chancellor Mansion, but facing east, where combat was lighter and his men suffered only 188 casualties. Disabled again by rheumatism, he left on medical leave to Washington, D.C., and rejoined his brigade at the end of June to march into Pennsylvania for the Gettysburg campaign.

=== Gettysburg ===
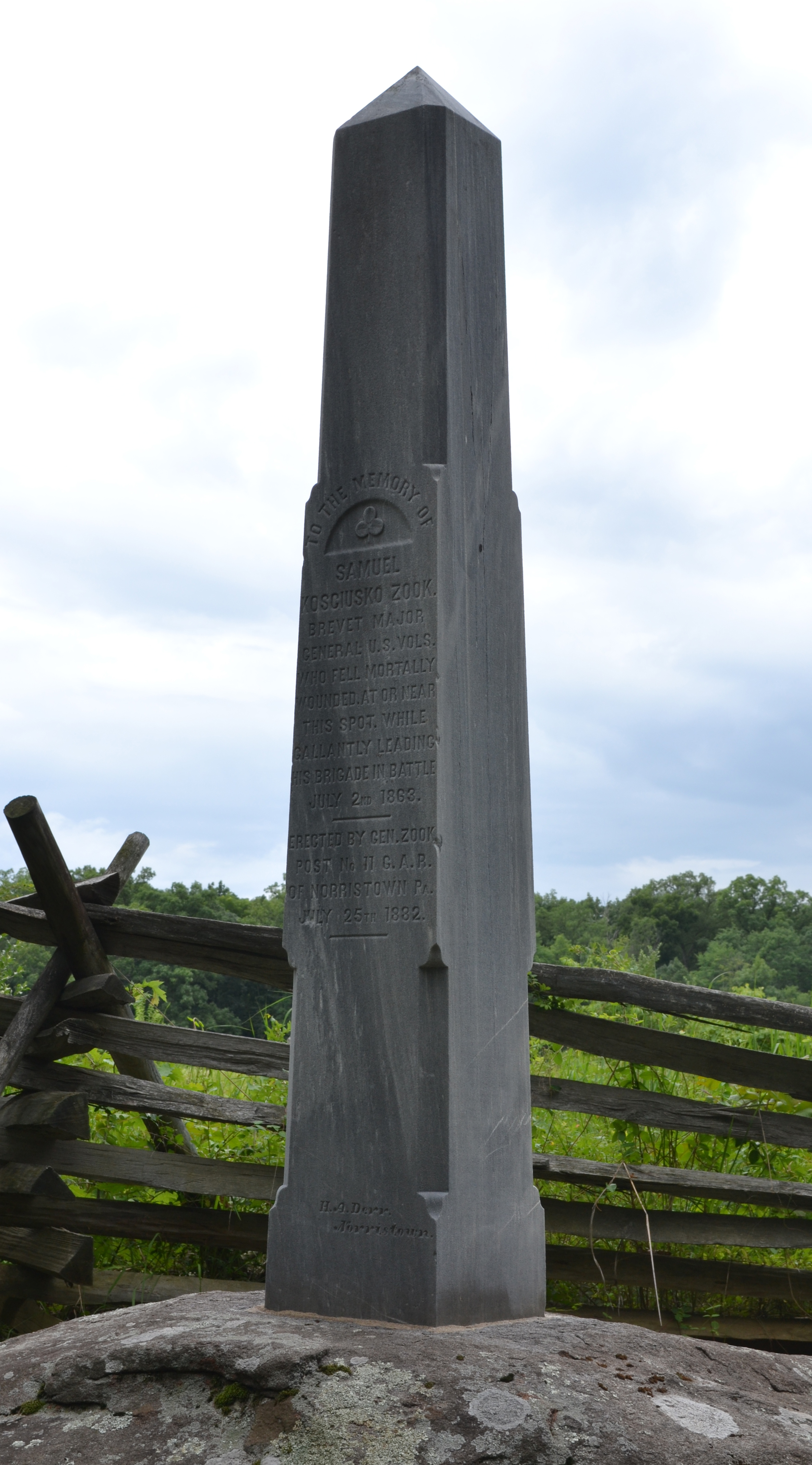
Zook Monument, The Wheatfield, Gettysburg Battlefield

On July 2, 1863, the second day of the Battle of Gettysburg, Brig. Gen. John C. Caldwell's division, including Zook's brigade, was sent to reinforce the crumbling III Corps line that was being assaulted by the Confederate corps of Lt. Gen. James Longstreet. Zook was directed by one of the III Corps staff officers toward the Wheatfield to reinforce the brigade of Col. Régis de Trobriand and to fill a gap near the Stony Hill. Zook, on horseback, led his men up the hill, which attracted the attention of men from the advancing 3rd and 7th South Carolina Infantry regiments, of Joseph B. Kershaw's brigade. He was struck by rifle fire in the shoulder, chest, and abdomen, and taken behind the lines for medical treatment at a toll house on the Baltimore Pike.

He died from his wounds on July 3 and is buried near the grave of General Winfield Scott Hancock in Montgomery Cemetery in West Norriton Township, Pennsylvania, near Norristown, Pennsylvania. He received a brevet promotion to major general for Gettysburg, awarded as of July 2. A small monument near the Wheatfield Road commemorates Zook's death.

One of his soldiers in the 57th New York later characterized Zook as "a good disciplinarian; he hated cowardice and shams; had no patience with a man that neglected duty; was blunt, somewhat severe, yet good hearted ... a born soldier, quick of intellect, and absolutely without fear."

== See also ==
- List of American Civil War generals (Union)
