= Adam J. Slemmer =

American Union Army general (1828–1868)

Adam Jacoby Slemmer
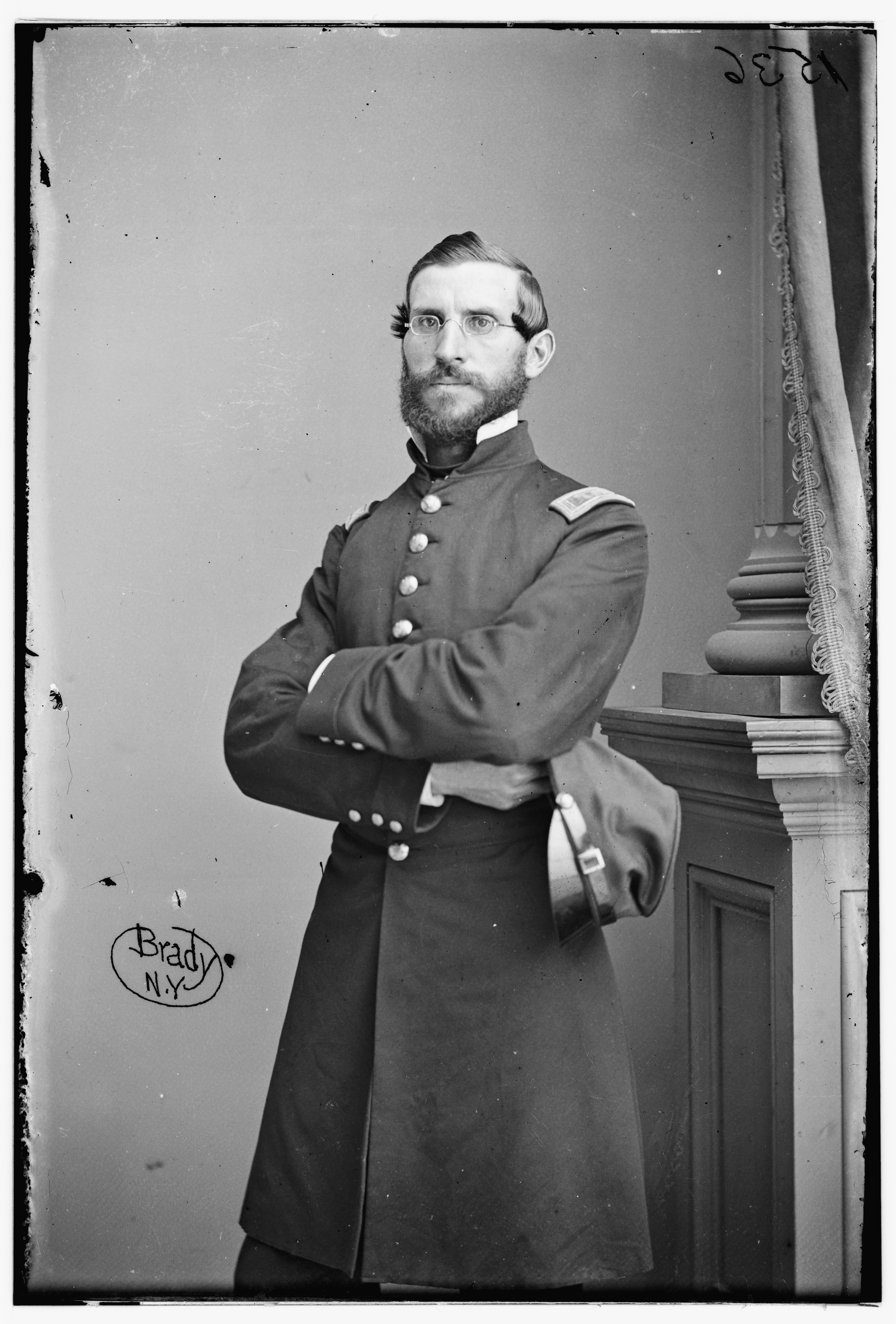
- Adam J. Slemmer from an article in Harper's Weekly
- Born: January 24, 1828; Montgomery County, Pennsylvania, U.S.
- Died: October 7, 1868 (aged 40); Fort Laramie, Wyoming Territory, U.S.
- Burial place: Montgomery Cemetery (West Norriton Township, Pennsylvania, U.S.)
- Military career
- Allegiance: United States of America; Union
- Branch: United States Army; Union Army
- Service years: 1850-1868
- Rank: Brigadier General
- Conflicts: Seminole Wars; American Civil War; Siege of Corinth; Battle of Stones River

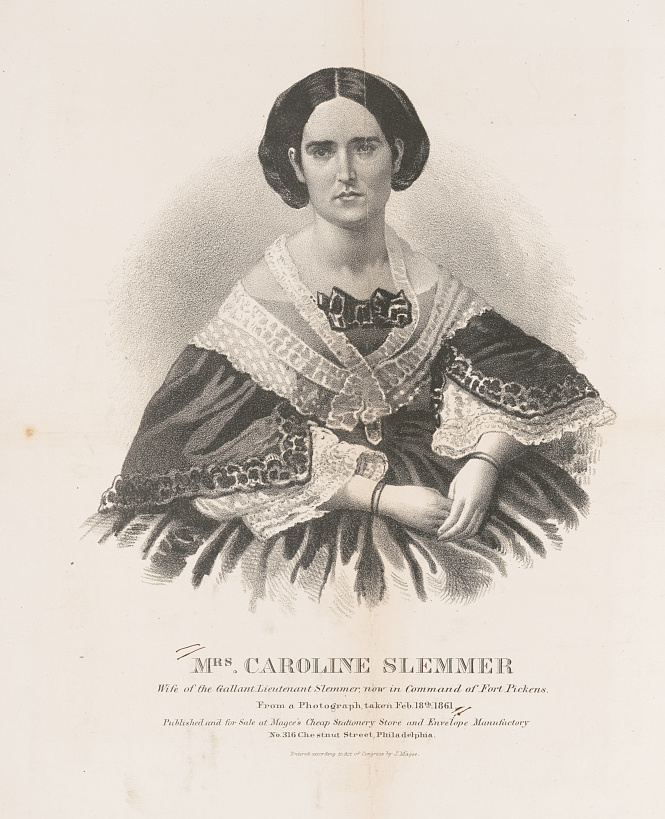
Mrs. Adam Slemmer on February 18, 1861

Adam Jacoby Slemmer (January 24, 1828 – October 7, 1868) was an officer in the United States Army during the Seminole Wars, the Old West, and the American Civil War.

== Early years ==
Slemmer was born in Montgomery County, Pennsylvania, and raised in Norristown. He graduated from the United States Military Academy at West Point, New York, in 1850 and was commissioned as a second lieutenant. He married Caroline Lane Reynolds in 1856. Their only child, a son, died young.

== Career ==
He served against the Seminoles in Florida and then was stationed in garrisons along the Pacific. From 1855 to 1859, he taught at West Point.

In January 1861, he was in command of a body of troops at Fort Barrancas, Pensacola Harbor, Fla. On January 10, after the surrender of the Pensacola Navy Yard, he transferred his force to the Fort Pickens position in the same harbor. He held this fort against the Confederate threat of attack and demands for surrender from Florida militia Colonel William Henry Chase, who had designed and constructed the fort as a captain in the U.S. Army Corps of Engineers. The garrison was reinforced in April 1861, and Slemmer was relieved. Fort Pickens remained under Federal control for the duration of the war.

Promoted to major in the new 16th U.S. Infantry Regiment in May 1861, he was attached to General Buell's command and took part in the Corinth campaign and the relief of Nashville. He led his battalion into the Battle of Stones River in December, receiving a wound that incapacitated him for the rest of the war. He was taken prisoner the following day but released during the Confederate retreat. In April 1863, backdated to November 29, 1862, he became brigadier general of volunteers. He served in administrative posts in Ohio and New York.

In 1861, a temporary earthwork, Fort Slemmer, for part of the Civil War Defenses of Washington, D.C. was named after him. It was abandoned in 1865 and demolished.

In 1863, A. J. Slemmer served as president of the Board of Examiners for sick officers at Columbus and Cincinnati, Ohio. Levi T. Townsend served as his clerk during this appointment.

In 1865, Slemmer was brevetted colonel in the Regular Army for meritorious conduct, and was commissioned lieutenant colonel of the 4th U.S. Infantry. On July 13, 1867, President Andrew Johnson nominated Slemmer for appointment to the grade of brevet brigadier general in the Regular Army, to rank from March 13, 1865, and the United States Senate confirmed the appointment on July 19, 1867. He died while in command of Fort Laramie from lingering effects of typhoid fever that he had contracted during the Civil War. Slemmer was buried in Montgomery Cemetery in West Norriton Township, Pennsylvania, near Norristown, Pennsylvania, on October 21, 1868.

== See also ==
- List of American Civil War generals (Union)
