= Joseph Fornance =

American politician

Member of the U.S. House of Representatives from Pennsylvania's 5th district
- In office March 4, 1839 – March 3, 1843
- Preceded by: Jacob Fry, Jr.
- Succeeded by: Jacob Senewell Yost

Personal details
- Born: October 18, 1804 Lower Merion Township, Pennsylvania, U.S.
- Died: November 24, 1852 (aged 48) Norristown, Pennsylvania, U.S.
- Resting place: Montgomery Cemetery, in West Norriton Township, Pennsylvania
- Party: Democratic

Joseph Fornance (October 18, 1804 – November 24, 1852) was an American lawyer and politician who served two terms as a Democratic member of the U.S. House of Representatives from Pennsylvania from 1839 to 1843.

== Biography ==
Joseph Fornance born in Lower Merion Township, Pennsylvania. He studied law, was admitted to the bar in 1832, and commenced practice in Norristown, Pennsylvania. He served as president of the council of the Borough of Norristown. He was a member of the Pennsylvania House of Representatives in 1834.

=== Congress ===
Fornance was elected as a Democrat to the Twenty-sixth and Twenty-seventh Congresses. He was not a candidate for renomination in 1842.

=== Later career and death ===
He resumed the practice of his profession, and died in Norristown in 1852. He was interred in Montgomery Cemetery, in West Norriton Township, Pennsylvania, near Norristown.

=== Legacy ===
Fornance nominated future Civil War Major General and Democratic presidential candidate Winfield Scott Hancock for the United States Military Academy at West Point.

== Sources ==
- United States Congress. "Joseph Fornance (id: F000276)". Biographical Directory of the United States Congress.
- The Political Graveyard

U.S. House of Representatives
Preceded by Jacob Fry, Jr.	Member of the U.S. House of Representatives from Pennsylvania's 5th congressional district 1839–1843	Succeeded by Jacob S. Yost
