= Winfield Scott Hancock =

United States Army officer (1824–1886)

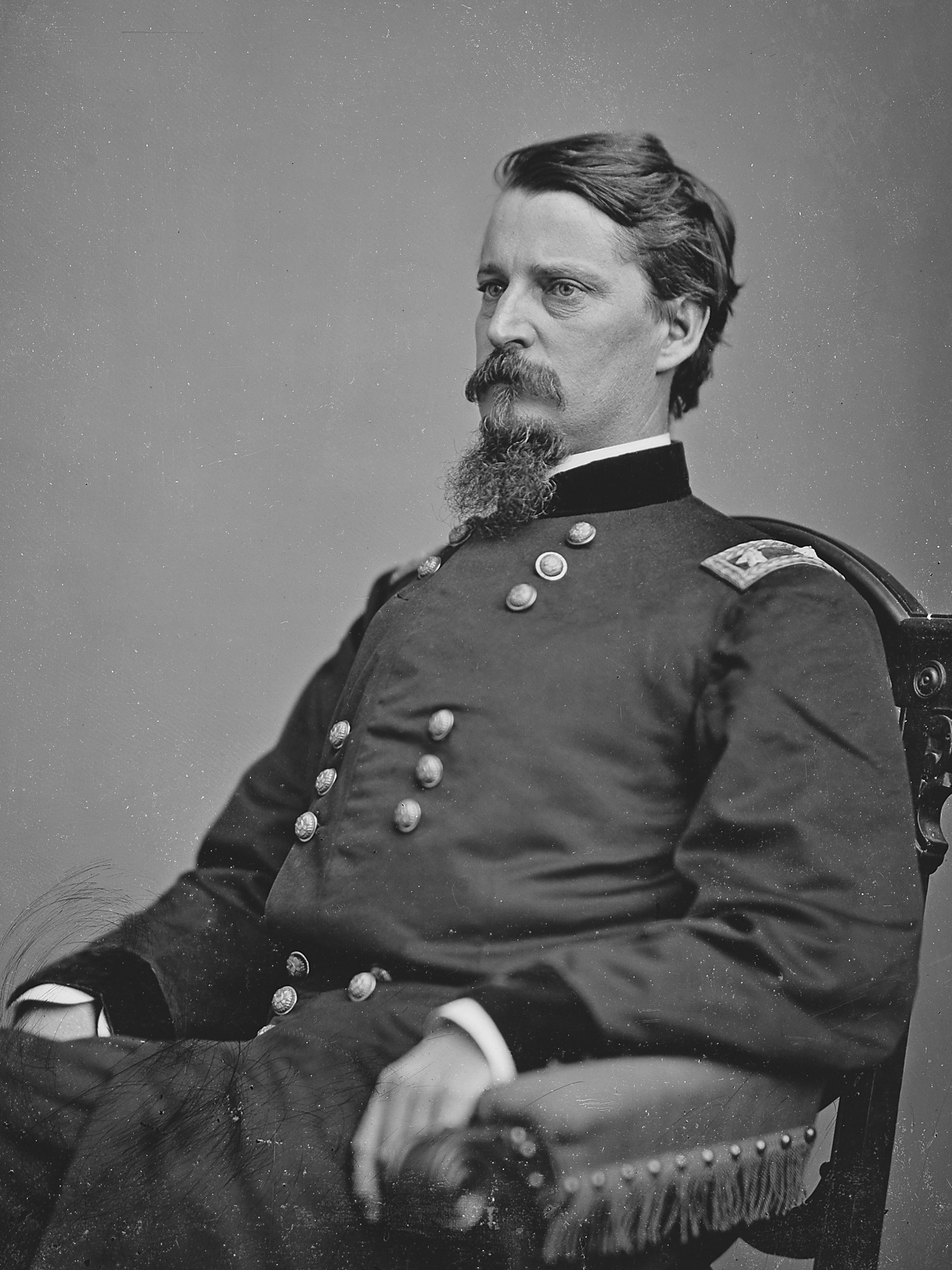
- Hancock, c. 1860s

Personal details
- Born: February 14, 1824 Montgomeryville, Pennsylvania, U.S.
- Died: February 9, 1886 (aged 61) New York City, U.S.
- Resting place: Montgomery Cemetery (West Norriton Township, Pennsylvania, U.S.)
- Party: Democratic
- Spouse: Almira Russell (m. 1850)
- Children: 2
- Education: United States Military Academy (BS)
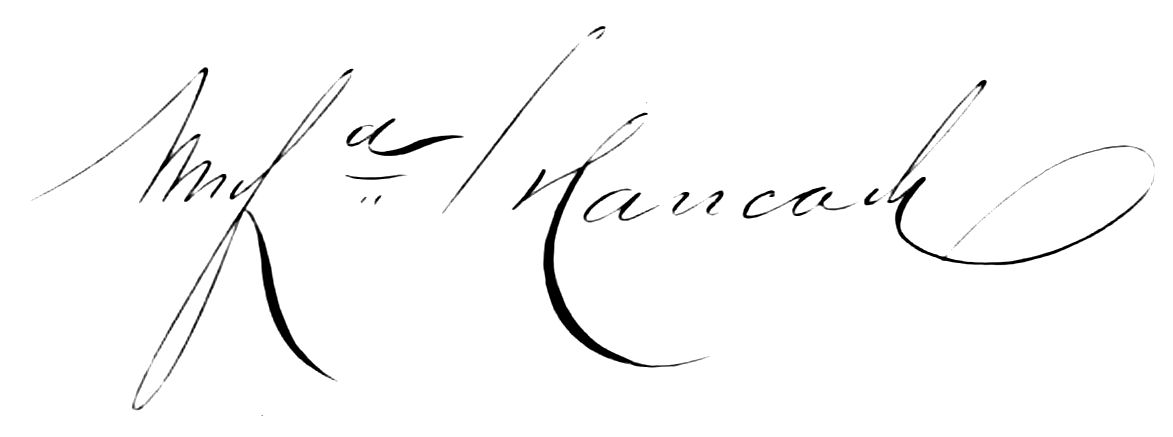
- Signature
- Nickname: Hancock the Superb

Military service
- Allegiance: United States
- Branch/service: U.S. Army (Union Army)
- Years of service: 1844–1886
- Rank: Major General
- Commands: II Corps
- Battles/wars: Mexican–American War; Battle of Contreras; Battle of Churubusco; American Civil War; Battle of Williamsburg; Battle of Malvern Hill; Battle of Antietam; Battle of Fredericksburg; Battle of Chancellorsville; Battle of Gettysburg (WIA); Battle of the Wilderness; Battle of Spotsylvania Court House; Battle of Cold Harbor; First Battle of Deep Bottom; Second Battle of Deep Bottom; Second Battle of Ream's Station; Battle of Boydton Plank Road; American Indian Wars

Winfield Scott Hancock (February 14, 1824 – February 9, 1886) was a major general in the United States Army and the Democratic nominee for President of the United States in 1880. He served with distinction in the Army for four decades, including service in the Mexican–American War and as a Union general in the American Civil War. Known to his Army as "Hancock the Superb", he was noted in particular for his personal leadership at the Battle of Gettysburg in 1863. His military service continued after the Civil War, as Hancock participated in the military Reconstruction of the South and the United States's western expansion and war with the Native Americans at the Western frontier. This concluded with the Medicine Lodge Treaty. From 1881 to 1885 he was president of the Aztec Club of 1847 for veteran officers of the Mexican-American War.

Hancock's reputation as a war hero at Gettysburg, combined with his status as a Unionist and supporter of states' rights, made him a potential presidential candidate. When the Democrats nominated him for president in 1880, he ran a strong campaign, but was narrowly defeated by Ohio congressman and Republican Party nominee James A. Garfield. Hancock's last public service involved the oversight of President Ulysses S. Grant's funeral procession in 1885.

== Early life and family ==
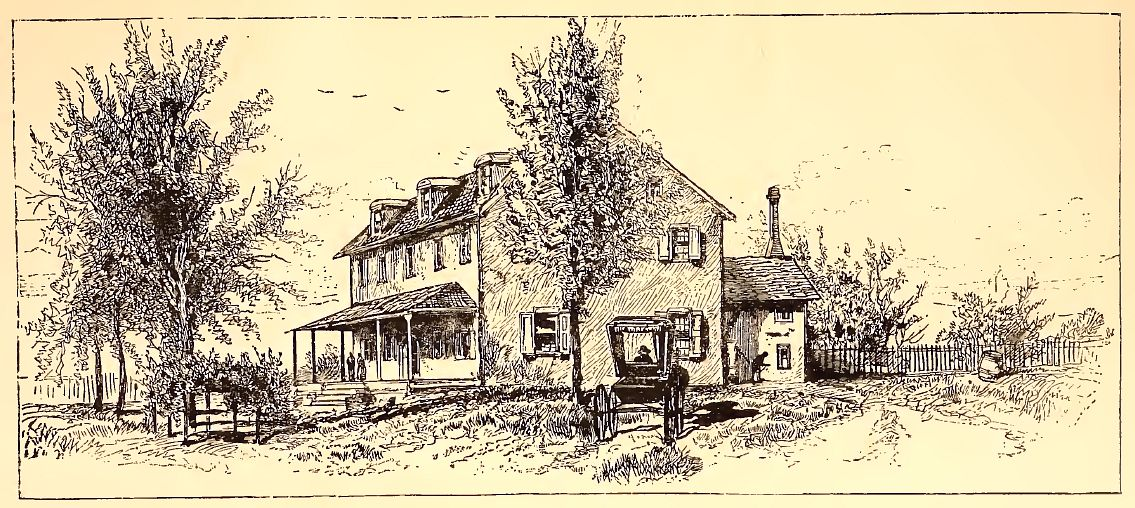
Birthplace of Winfield Scott Hancock historical depiction taken from biography

Winfield Scott Hancock and his identical twin brother Hilary Baker Hancock were born on February 14, 1824, in Montgomery Square, Pennsylvania, a hamlet just northwest of Philadelphia in present-day Montgomery Township. The twins were the sons of Benjamin Franklin Hancock and Elizabeth Hoxworth Hancock. Winfield was named after Winfield Scott, a prominent general in the War of 1812.

The Hancock and Hoxworth families had lived in Montgomery County for several generations, and were of English, Scottish, and Welsh descent. Benjamin Hancock was a schoolteacher when his sons were born. A few years after their birth, he moved the family to Norristown, the county seat, and began to practice law. Benjamin was also a deacon in the Baptist church and participated in municipal government (as an avowed Democrat).

Hancock was at first educated at Norristown Academy, but removed to the public schools when the first one opened in Norristown in the late 1830s. In 1840, Joseph Fornance, the local Congressman, nominated Hancock to the United States Military Academy at West Point. Hancock's progress at West Point was average. He graduated 18th in his class of 25 in 1844, and he was assigned to the infantry.

== Early military career ==
=== Mexican War ===
Hancock was commissioned a brevet second lieutenant in the 6th U.S. Infantry regiment, and initially was stationed in Indian Territory in the Red River Valley. The region was quiet at the time, and Hancock's time there was uneventful. Upon the outbreak of war with Mexico in 1846, Hancock worked to secure himself a place at the front. Initially assigned to recruiting duties in Kentucky, he proved so adept at signing up soldiers that his superiors were reluctant to release him from his post. By July 1847, however, Hancock was permitted to join his regiment in Puebla, Mexico, where they made up a part of the army led by his namesake, General Winfield Scott.

Scott's army moved farther inland from Puebla unopposed and attacked Mexico City from the south. During that campaign in 1847, Hancock first encountered battle at Contreras and Churubusco. He was appointed a brevet first lieutenant for gallant and meritorious service in those actions. Hancock was wounded in the knee at Churubusco and developed a fever. Although he was well enough to join his regiment at Molino del Rey, fever kept Hancock from participating in the final breakthrough to Mexico City, something he would regret for the rest of his life. After the final victory, Hancock remained in Mexico with the 6th Infantry until the treaty of peace was signed in 1848.

=== Marriage and peacetime ===
Hancock served in a number of assignments as an army quartermaster and adjutant, mostly in Fort Snelling, Minnesota, and St. Louis, Missouri. It was in St. Louis that he met Almira ("Allie") Russell and they married on January 24, 1850. Allie gave birth to two children, Russell in 1850 and Ada in 1857, but both children died before their parents. Hancock was promoted to captain in 1855 and assigned to Fort Myers, Florida. Hancock's young family accompanied him to his new posting, where Allie Hancock was the only woman on the post.

Hancock's tour in Florida coincided with the end of the Third Seminole War. His duties were primarily those of a quartermaster, and he did not see action in that campaign. As the situation in Florida began to settle down, Hancock was reassigned to Fort Leavenworth, Kansas. He served in the West during the partisan warfare of "Bleeding Kansas", and in the Utah Territory, where the 6th Infantry arrived after the Utah War. Following the resolution of that conflict, Hancock was stationed in southern California in November 1858. He remained there, joined by Allie and the children, until the Civil War broke out in 1861, serving as a captain and assistant quartermaster under future Confederate General Albert Sidney Johnston. In California, Hancock became friendly with a number of southern officers, most significantly Lewis A. Armistead of Virginia. At the outbreak of the Civil War, Armistead and the other southerners left to join the Confederate States Army, while Hancock remained in the service of the United States. When Armistead left, he turned to Hancock and said, "You'll never know what this is costing me, but goodbye, goodbye."

== Civil War ==
=== Joining the Army of the Potomac ===
Hancock stands the most conspicuous figure of all the general officers who did not exercise a separate command. He commanded a corps longer than any other one, and his name was never mentioned as having committed in battle a blunder for which he was responsible. He was a man of very conspicuous personal appearance.... His genial disposition made him friends, and his personal courage and his presence with his command in the thickest of the fight won for him the confidence of troops serving under him. No matter how hard the fight, the 2nd corps always felt that their commander was looking after them.
—Ulysses S. Grant, Personal Memoirs

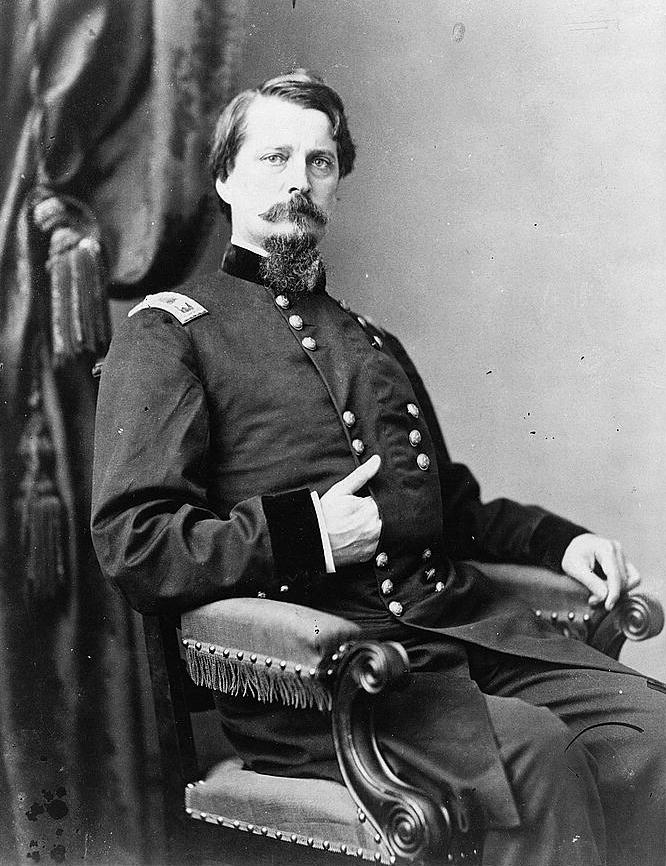
General Winfield Scott Hancock

Hancock returned east to assume quartermaster duties for the rapidly growing Union Army, but was quickly promoted to brigadier general on September 23, 1861, and given an infantry brigade to command in the division of Brig. Gen. William F. "Baldy" Smith, Army of the Potomac. He earned his "Superb" nickname in the Peninsula Campaign, in 1862, by leading a critical counterattack in the Battle of Williamsburg; army commander Maj. Gen. George B. McClellan telegraphed to Washington that "Hancock was superb today" and the appellation stuck. McClellan did not follow through on Hancock's initiative, however, and Confederate forces were allowed to withdraw unmolested.

In the Battle of Antietam, Hancock assumed command of the 1st Division, II Corps, following the mortal wounding of Maj. Gen. Israel B. Richardson in the horrific fighting at "Bloody Lane". Hancock and his staff made a dramatic entrance to the battlefield, galloping between his troops and the enemy, parallel to the Sunken Road. His men assumed that Hancock would order counterattacks against the exhausted Confederates, but he carried orders from McClellan to hold his position. He was promoted to major general of volunteers on November 29, 1862. He led his division in the disastrous attack on Marye's Heights in the Battle of Fredericksburg the following month and was wounded in the abdomen. At the Battle of Chancellorsville, his division covered Maj. Gen. Joseph Hooker's withdrawal and Hancock was wounded again. His corps commander, Maj. Gen. Darius N. Couch, transferred out of the Army of the Potomac in protest of actions Hooker took in the battle and Hancock assumed command of II Corps, which he would lead until shortly before the war's end.

=== Gettysburg ===
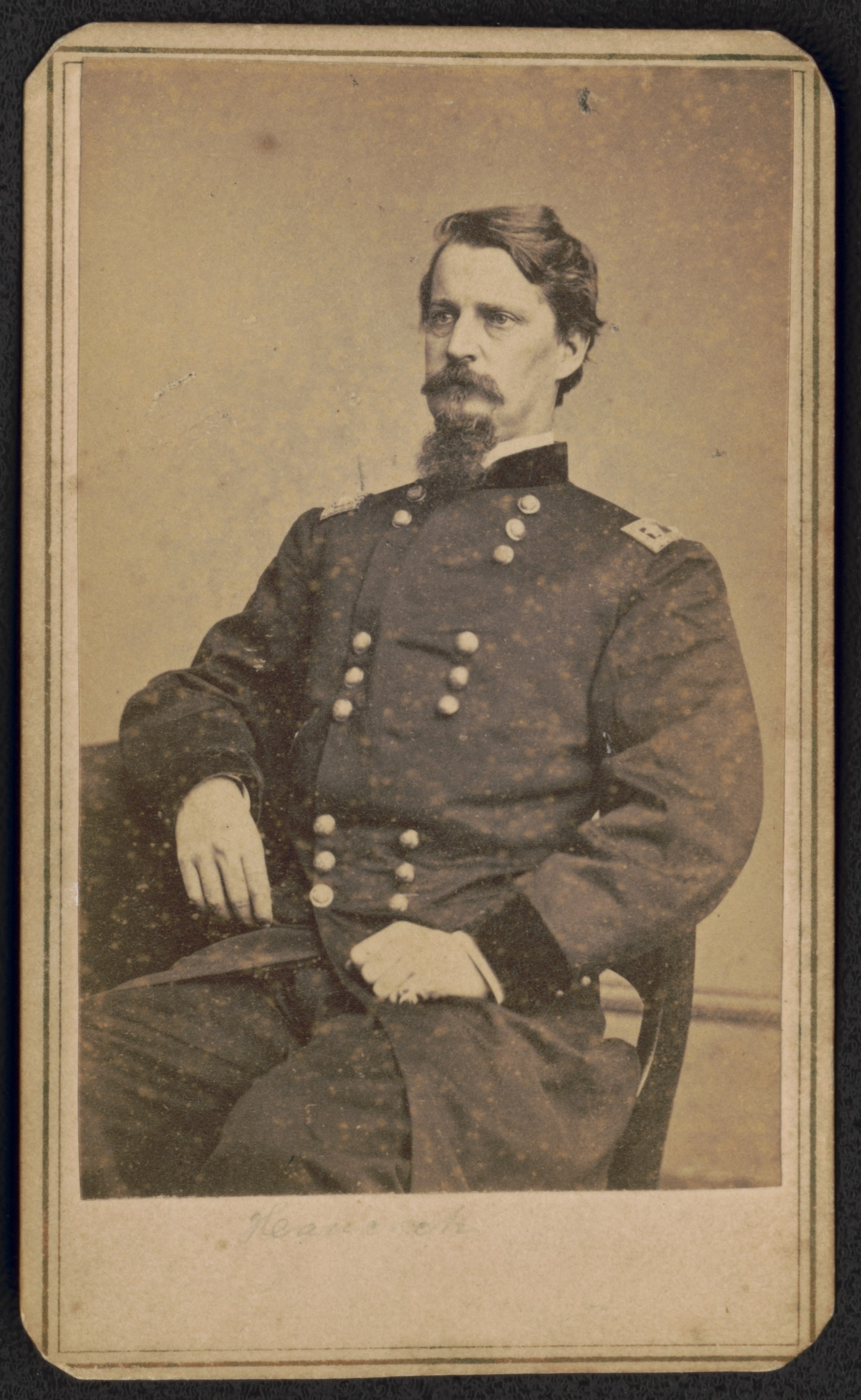
Major General Winfield Scott Hancock. From the Liljenquist Family Collection of Civil War Photographs, Prints and Photographs Division, Library of Congress

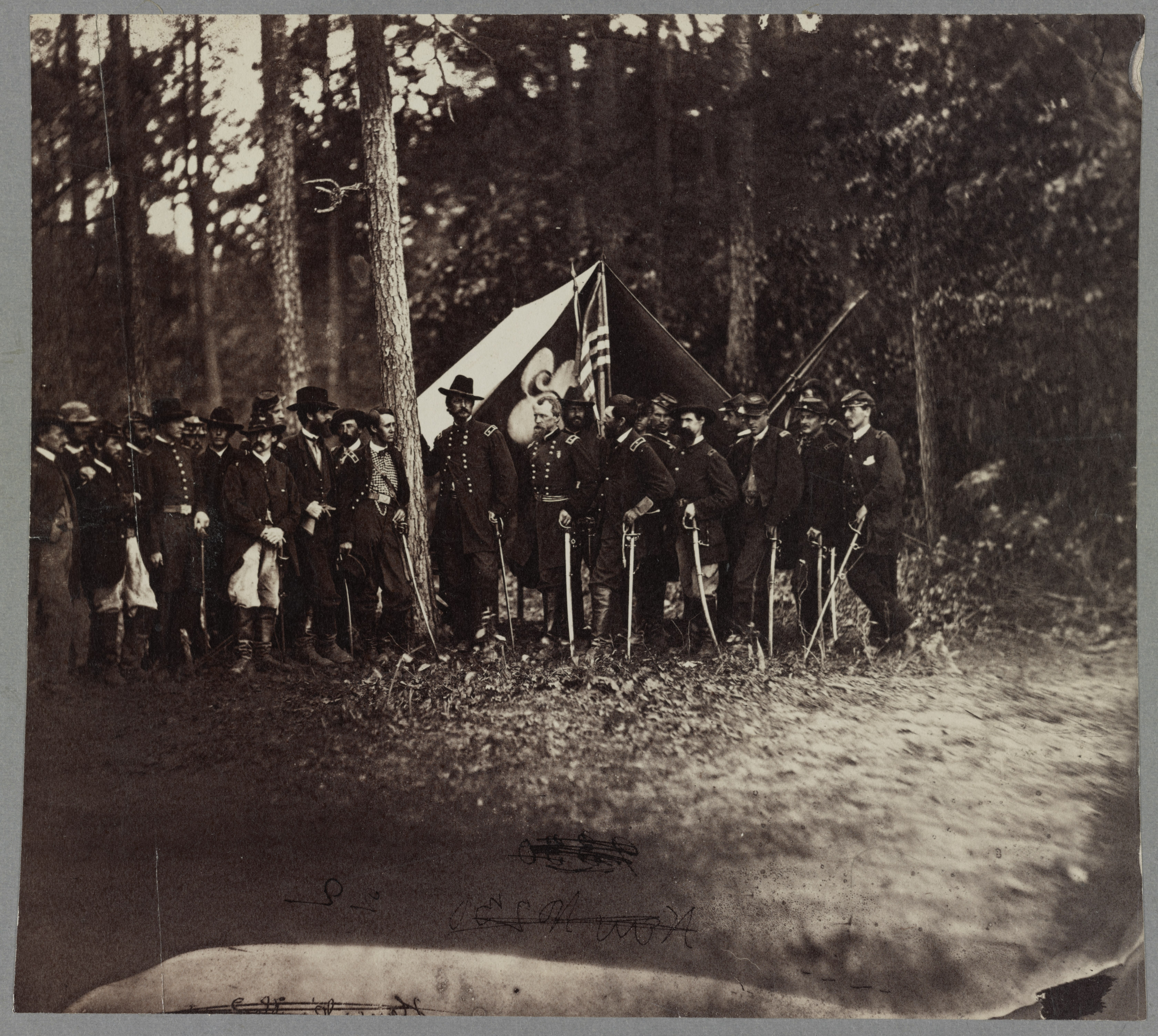
Winfield S. Hancock and staff during the Civil War

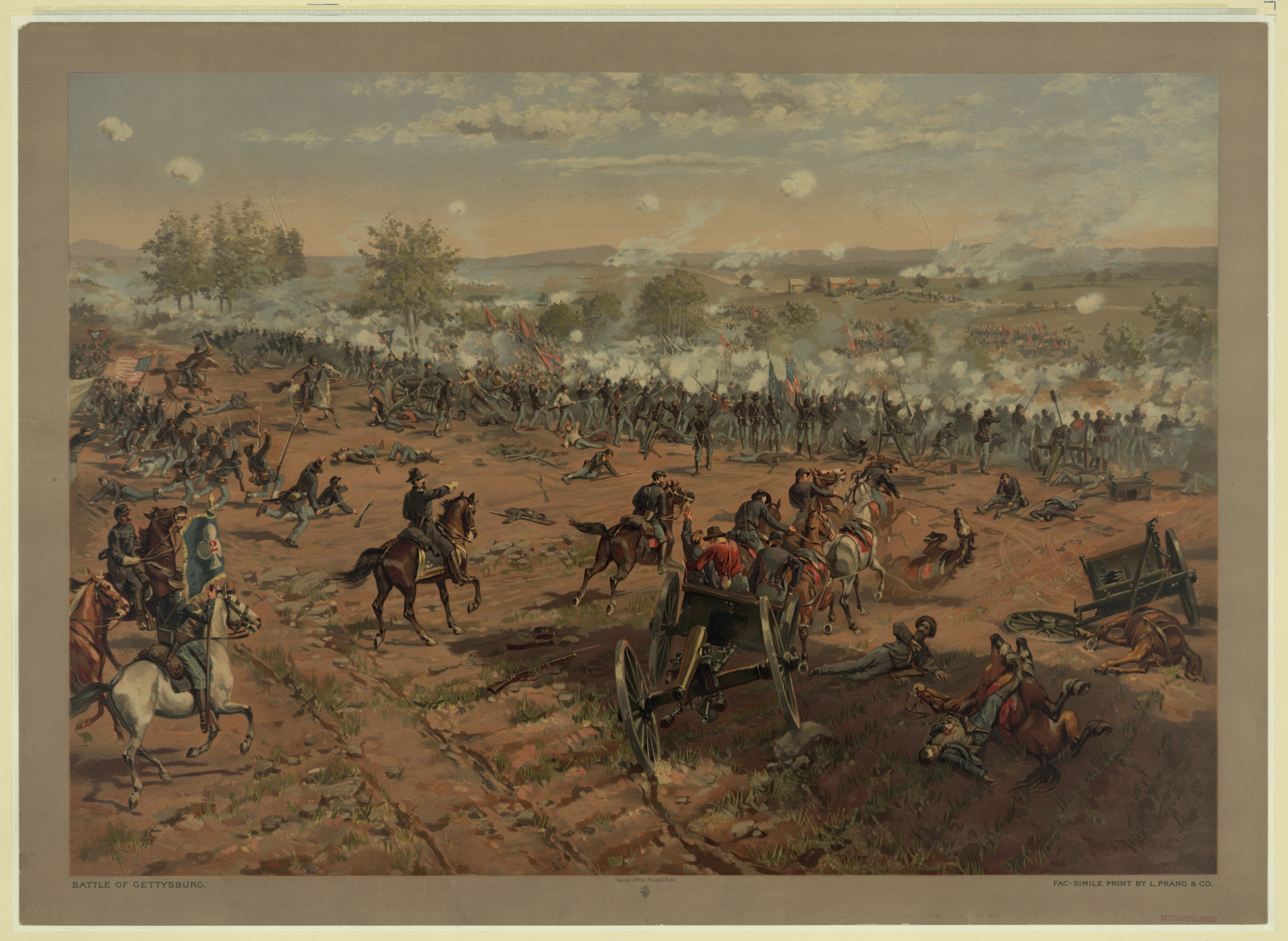
Major General Winfield S. Hancock riding along the Union lines during the Confederate bombardment prior to Pickett's Charge, lithograph by the company of Louis Prang

Hancock's most famous service was as a new corps commander at the Battle of Gettysburg, July 1 to 3, 1863. After his friend, Maj. Gen. John F. Reynolds, was killed early on July 1, Maj. Gen. George G. Meade, the new commander of the Army of the Potomac, sent Hancock ahead to take command of the units on the field and assess the situation. Hancock thus was in temporary command of the "left wing" of the army, consisting of the I, II, III, and XI Corps. This demonstrated Meade's high confidence in him, because Hancock was not the most senior Union officer at Gettysburg at the time. Hancock and the more senior XI Corps commander, Maj. Gen. Oliver O. Howard, argued briefly about this command arrangement, but Hancock prevailed and he organized the Union defenses on Cemetery Hill as more numerous Confederate forces drove the I and XI Corps back through the town. He had the authority from Meade to withdraw, so he was responsible for the decision to stand and fight at Gettysburg. At the conclusion of the day's action, Maj. Gen. Henry Warner Slocum arrived on the field and assumed command until Gen. Meade arrived after midnight.

On July 2, Hancock's II Corps was positioned on Cemetery Ridge, roughly in the center of the Union line, while Confederate Gen. Robert E. Lee launched assaults on both ends of the line. On the Union left, Lt. Gen. James Longstreet's assault smashed the III Corps and Hancock sent in his 1st Division, under Brig. Gen. John C. Caldwell, to reinforce the Union in the Wheatfield. As Lt. Gen. A.P. Hill's corps continued the attack toward the Union center, Hancock rallied the defenses and rushed units to the critical spots. First, he sent the 3rd Brigade of the 3rd Division, under Col. George Willard, into the fray to stop the advance of Confederate Brigadier General William Barksdale's Brigade. In one famous incident, he sacrificed a regiment, the 1st Minnesota Volunteer Infantry Regiment, by ordering it to advance and charge a Confederate brigade four times its size, causing the Minnesotans to suffer 87% casualties. While costly, this sacrifice bought time to organize the defensive line and saved the day for the Union Army. Following the action toward his right, he sent the 13th Vermont Volunteer Infantry Regiment of the 1st Corps, which had come from Cemetery Hill to help quell the crisis, to recover some artillery pieces the Confederates had captured and were pulling away. The Vermonters were successful. Having stabilized his line, he turned his attention to the sound of fighting on East Cemetery Hill. There, with darkness falling, Confederates from Maj. Gen. Jubal Early's Division had gotten into Union batteries and were fighting the cannoneers hand-to-hand. Hancock sent the First Brigade of his Third Division, under Colonel Samuel S. Carroll, to the fighting. The brigade was crucial in flushing the enemy out of the batteries and dispatching them back down the face of East Cemetery Hill.

On July 3, Hancock defended his position on Cemetery Ridge and thus bore the brunt of Pickett's Charge. During the massive Confederate artillery bombardment that preceded the infantry assault, Hancock was prominent on horseback, reviewing and encouraging his troops. When one of his subordinates protested, "General, the corps commander ought not to risk his life that way," Hancock is said to have replied, "There are times when a corps commander's life does not count." During the infantry assault, his old friend, Brig. Gen. Lewis A. Armistead, now leading a brigade in Maj. Gen. George Pickett's division, was wounded and died two days later. Hancock could not meet with his friend because he had just been wounded himself, a severe wound caused by a bullet striking the pommel of his saddle, entering his inner right thigh along with wood fragments and a large bent nail. Helped from his horse by aides, and with a tourniquet applied to stanch the bleeding, he removed the saddle nail himself and, mistaking its source, remarked wryly, "They must be hard up for ammunition when they throw such shot as that." News of Armistead's mortal wounding was brought to Hancock by a member of his staff, Capt. Henry H. Bingham. Despite his pain, Hancock refused evacuation to the rear until the battle was resolved. He had been an inspiration for his troops throughout the three-day battle. Hancock later received the thanks of the U.S. Congress for "... his gallant, meritorious and conspicuous share in that great and decisive victory."

One military historian wrote, "No other Union general at Gettysburg dominated men by the sheer force of their presence more completely than Hancock." As another wrote, "his tactical skill had won him the quick admiration of adversaries who had come to know him as the 'Thunderbolt of the Army of the Potomac'."

=== Virginia and the end of the war ===
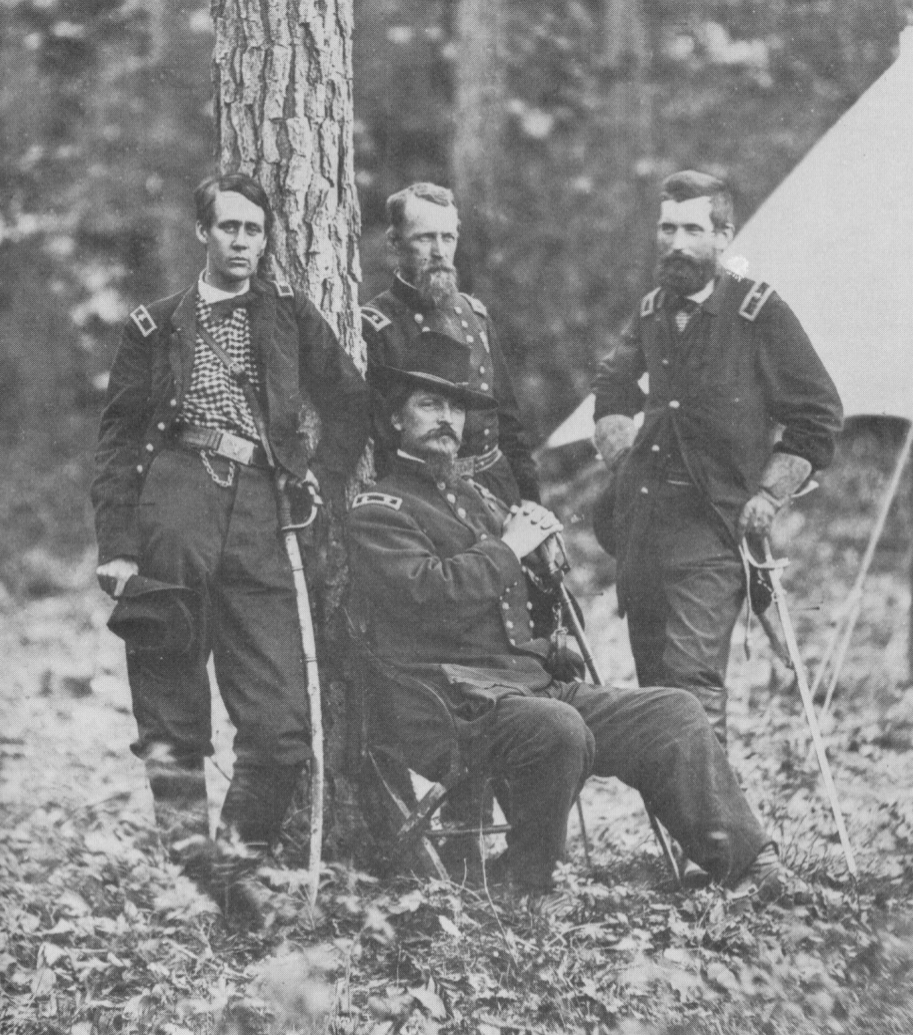
Hancock, surrounded by three of his division commanders: Francis C. Barlow, David B. Birney, and John Gibbon during the Wilderness campaign

Hancock suffered from the effects of his Gettysburg wound for the rest of the war. After recuperating in Norristown, he performed recruiting services over the winter and returned in the spring to field command of the II Corps for Lt. Gen. Ulysses S. Grant's 1864 Overland Campaign, but he never regained full mobility and his former youthful energy. Nevertheless, he performed well at the Battle of the Wilderness and commanded a critical breakthrough assault of the Mule Shoe at the "Bloody Angle" in the Battle of Spotsylvania Court House on May 12, shattering the Confederate defenders in his front, including the Stonewall Brigade. His corps suffered enormous losses during a futile assault Grant ordered at Cold Harbor.

After Grant's army slipped past Lee's army to cross the James River, Hancock found himself in a position from which he might have ended the war. His corps arrived to support William Farrar Smith's assaults on the lightly held Petersburg defensive lines, but he deferred to Smith's advice because Smith knew the ground and had been on the field all day, and no significant assaults were made before the Confederate lines were reinforced. One of the great opportunities of the war was lost. After his corps participated in the assaults at Deep Bottom, Hancock was promoted to brigadier general in the regular army, effective August 12, 1864.

Hancock's only significant military defeat occurred during the siege of Petersburg. His II Corps moved south of the city, along the Wilmington and Weldon Railroad, tearing up track. On August 25, Confederate Maj. Gen. Henry Heth attacked and overran the faulty Union position at Reams's Station, shattering the II Corps, capturing many prisoners. Despite a later victory at Hatcher's Run, the humiliation of Reams's Station contributed, along with the lingering effects of his Gettysburg wound, to his decision to give up field command in November. He left the II Corps after a year in which it had suffered over 40,000 casualties, but had achieved significant military victories. His next assignment was to command the ceremonial First Veteran Corps. He performed more recruiting, commanded the Middle Department, and relieved Maj. Gen. Philip Sheridan in command of forces in the now-quiet Shenandoah Valley. He was promoted to brevet major general in the regular army for his service at Spotsylvania, effective March 13, 1865.

== Post-war military service ==
=== Execution of Lincoln assassination conspirators ===
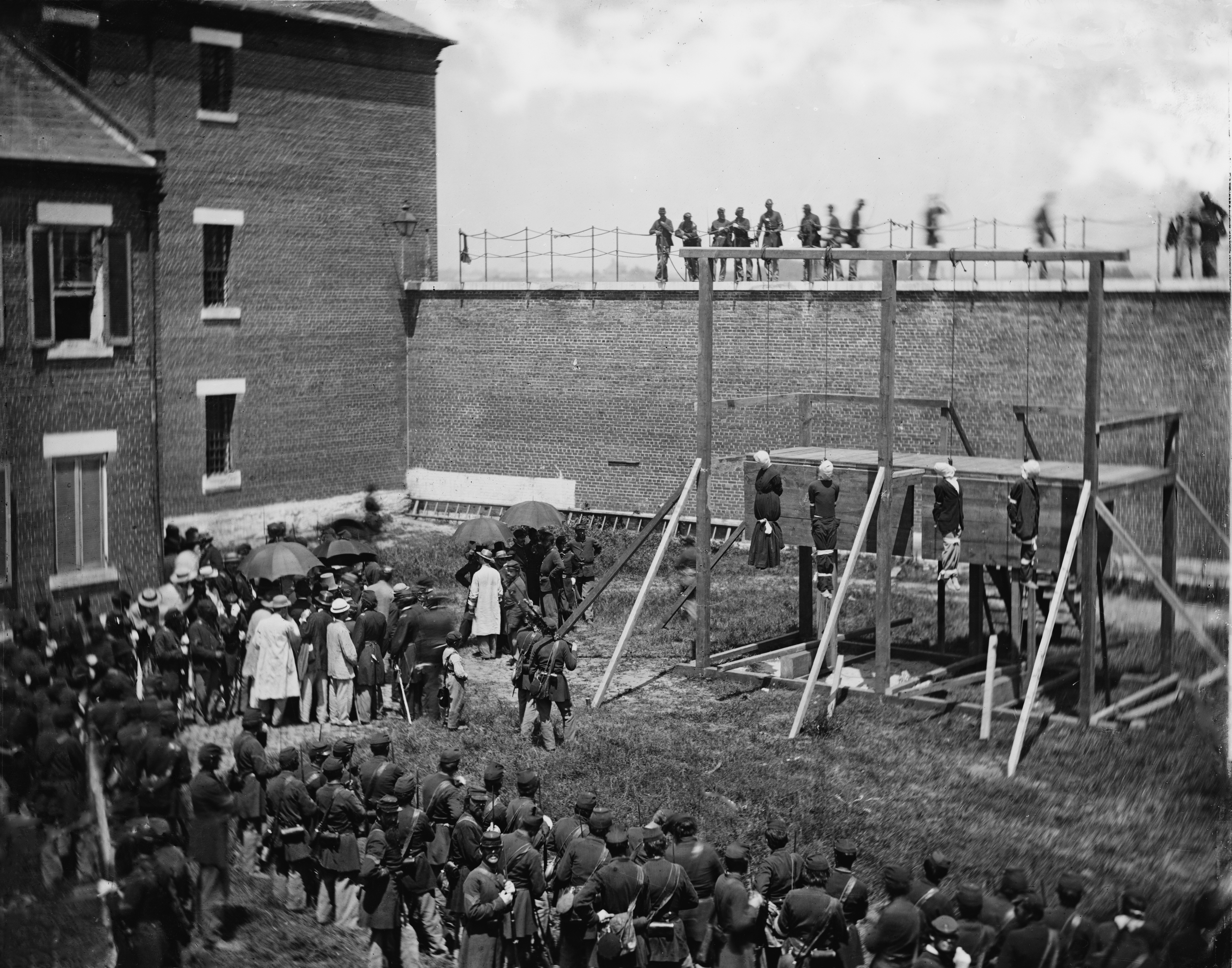
The execution of the Lincoln assassination conspirators, July 7, 1865

At the close of the war, Hancock was assigned to supervise the execution of the conspirators in the assassination of President Abraham Lincoln. Lincoln had been assassinated on April 14, 1865, and by May 9 of that year, a military commission had been convened to try the accused. The actual assassin, John Wilkes Booth, was already dead, but the trial of his co-conspirators proceeded quickly, resulting in convictions. President Andrew Johnson ordered the executions to be carried out on July 7. Although he was reluctant to execute some of the less-culpable conspirators, especially Mary Surratt, Hancock carried out his orders, later writing that "every soldier was bound to act as I did under similar circumstances."

=== Service on the Plains ===
After the executions, Hancock was assigned command of the newly organized Middle Military Department, headquartered in Baltimore. In 1866, on Grant's recommendation, Hancock was promoted to major general and was transferred, later that year, to command of the military Department of the Missouri, which included the states of Missouri and Kansas and the territories of Colorado and New Mexico. Hancock reported to Fort Leavenworth, Kansas, and took up his new posting.

Soon after arriving, he was assigned by General Sherman to lead an expedition to negotiate with the Cheyenne and Sioux, with whom relations had worsened since the Sand Creek massacre. The negotiations got off to a bad start, and after Hancock ordered the burning of an abandoned Cheyenne village in central Kansas, relations became worse than when the expedition had started.

The official report to the President by the Indian Peace Commission found that the actions of George Custer and other subordinates just after Hancock's arrival led to an instigation of violent reprisals by the Native Americans:

Orders were then given to surround the village and capture the Indians remaining. The order was obeyed, but the chiefs and warriors had departed. The only persons found were an old Sioux and an idiotic girl of eight or nine years of age. It afterwards appeared that the person of this girl had been violated, from which she soon died. The Indians were gone, and the report spread that she had been a captive among them, and they had committed this outrage before leaving. The Indians say that she was an idiotic Cheyenne girl, forgotten in the confusion of flight, and if violated, it was not by them.

The next morning General Custer, under orders, started in pursuit of the Indians with his cavalry, and performed a campaign of great labor and suffering, passing over a vast extent of country, but seeing no hostile Indians. When the fleeing Indians reached the Smoky Hill they destroyed a station and killed several men. A courier having brought this intelligence to General Hancock, he at once ordered the Indian village, of about 300 lodges, together with the entire property of the tribes, to be burned.

The Indian now became an outlaw -- not only the Cheyennes and Sioux, but all the tribes on the plains. The superintendent of an express company, Cottrell, issued a circular order to the agents and employees of the company in the following language: "You will hold no communications with Indians whatever. If Indians come within shooting distance, shoot them. Show them no mercy, for they will show you none." This was in the Indian country. He closes by saying: "General Hancock will protect you and our property."

Whether war existed previous to that time seems to have been a matter of doubt even with General Hancock himself. From that day forward no doubt on the subject was entertained by anybody. The Indians were then fully aroused, and no more determined war has ever been waged by them. The evidence taken tends to show that we have lost many soldiers, besides a larger number of settlers, on the frontier. The most valuable trains belonging to individuals, as well as to government, among which was a government train of ammunition, were captured by those wild horsemen. Stations were destroyed. Hundreds of horses and mules were taken, and found in their possession when we met them in council; while we are forced to believe that their entire loss since the burning of their village consists of six men killed.

The Kiowas and Comanches, it will be seen, deny the statement of Jones in every particular. They say that no war party came in at the time stated, or at any other time, after the treaty of 1865. They deny that they killed any Negro soldiers, and positively assert that no Indian was ever known to scalp a Negro. In the latter statement they are corroborated by all the tribes and by persons who know their habits; and the records of the adjutant general's office fail to show the loss of the 17 Negro soldiers, or any soldiers at all. They deny having robbed Jones or insulted Page or Tappan. Tappan's testimony was taken, in which he brands the whole statement of Jones as false, and declares that both he and Page so informed Major Douglas within a few days after Jones made his affidavit. We took the testimony of Major Douglas, in which he admits the correctness of Tappan's statement, but, for some reason unexplained, he failed to communicate the correction to General Hancock. The threats to take the horses and attack the posts on the Arkansas were made in a vein of jocular bravado, and not understood by any one present at the time to possess the least importance. The case of the Box family has already been explained, and this completes the case against the Kiowas and Comanches, who are exculpated by the united testimony of all the tribes from any share in the late troubles.

The Cheyennes admit that one of their young men in a private quarrel, both parties being drunk, killed a New Mexican at Fort Zarah. Such occurrences are so frequent among the whites on the plains that ignorant Indians might be pardoned for participating, if it be done merely to evidence their advance in civilization. The Indians claim that the Spaniard was in fault, and further protest that no demand was ever made for the delivery of the Indian.

The Arapahoes admit that a party of their young men, with three young warriors of the Cheyennes, returning from an excursion against the Utes, attacked the train of Mr. Weddell, of New Mexico, during the month of March, and they were gathering up the stock when the war commenced.

Though this recital should prove tedious, it was thought necessary to guard the future against the errors of the past. We would not blunt the vigilance of military men in the Indian country, but we would warn them against the acts of the selfish and unprincipled, who need to be watched as well as the Indian. The origin and progress of this war are repeated in nearly all Indian wars. The history of one will suffice for many.

Nor would we be understood as conveying a censure of General Hancock [emphasis added] for organizing this expedition. He had just come to the department, and circumstances were ingeniously woven to deceive him. His distinguished services in another field of patriotic duty had left him but little time to become acquainted with the remote or immediate causes producing these troubles. If he erred, he can very well roll a part of the responsibility on others; not alone on subordinate commanders, who were themselves deceived by others, but on those who were able to guard against the error and yet failed to do it. We have hundreds of treaties with the Indians, and military posts are situated everywhere on their reservations. Since 1837 these treaties have not been compiled, and no provision is made, when a treaty is proclaimed, to furnish it to the commanders of posts, departments, or divisions. This is the fault of Congress.

=== Reconstruction ===
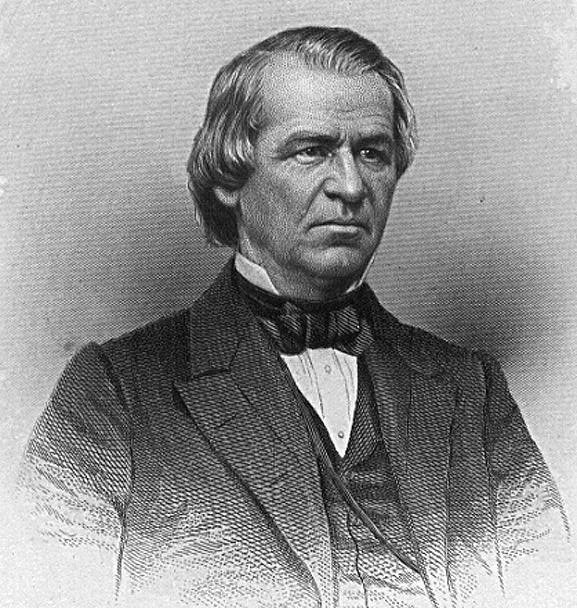
Andrew Johnson thought Hancock was the ideal Reconstruction general.

Hancock's time in the West was brief. President Johnson, unhappy with the way Republican generals were governing the South under Reconstruction, sought replacements for them. The general who offended Johnson the most was Philip Sheridan, and Johnson soon ordered General Grant to switch the assignments of Hancock and Sheridan, believing that Hancock, a Democrat, would govern in a style more to Johnson's liking. Although neither man was pleased with the change, Sheridan reported to Fort Leavenworth and Hancock to New Orleans.

Hancock's new assignment found him in charge of the Fifth Military District, covering Texas and Louisiana. Almost immediately upon arriving, Hancock ingratiated himself with the secessionist white population by issuing his General Order Number 40 of November 29, 1867. In that order, written while traveling to New Orleans, Hancock expressed sentiments in support of President Johnson's policies, writing that if the residents of the district conducted themselves peacefully and the civilian officials perform their duties, then "the military power should cease to lead, and the civil administration resume its natural and rightful dominion." The order continued:

The great principles of American liberty are still the lawful inheritance of this people, and ever should be. The right of trial by jury, the habeas corpus, the liberty of the press, the freedom of speech, the natural rights of persons and the rights of property must be preserved. Free institutions, while they are essential to the prosperity and happiness of the people, always furnish the strongest inducements to peace and order.

Hancock's order encouraged white Democrats across the South who hoped to return to civilian government more quickly, but discomforted blacks and Republicans in the South who feared a return to the antebellum ways of traditional white dominance.

Hancock's General Order Number 40 was quickly condemned by Republicans in Washington, especially by the Radicals, while President Johnson wholeheartedly approved. Heedless of the situation in Washington, Hancock soon put his words into action, refusing local Republican politicians' requests to use his power to overturn elections and court verdicts, while also letting it be known that open insurrection would be suppressed. Hancock's popularity within the Democratic party grew to the extent that he was considered a potential presidential nominee for that party in the 1868 election. Although Hancock collected a significant number of delegates at the 1868 convention, his presidential possibilities went unfulfilled. Even so, he was henceforth identified as a rare breed in politics: one who believed in the Democratic Party's principles of states' rights and limited government, but whose anti-secessionist sentiment was unimpeachable.

=== Return to the Plains ===
Following General Grant's 1868 presidential victory, the Republicans were firmly in charge in Washington. As a result, Hancock found himself transferred, this time away from the sensitive assignment of reconstructing the South and into the relative backwater that was the Department of Dakota. The Department covered Minnesota, Montana, and the Dakotas. As in his previous Western command, Hancock began with a conference of the Indian chiefs, but this time was more successful in establishing a peaceful intent. Relations worsened in 1870, however, as an army expedition committed a massacre against the Blackfeet. Relations with the Sioux also became contentious as a result of white encroachment into the Black Hills, in violation of the Treaty of Fort Laramie.

It was during this tour that Hancock had the opportunity to contribute to the creation of Yellowstone National Park. In August 1870, he ordered the 2nd Cavalry at Fort Ellis to provide a military escort for General Henry D. Washburn's planned exploration of the Yellowstone Region. The expedition, which was a major impetus in creating the park, became known as the Washburn-Langford-Doane Expedition. Hancock's order led to the assignment of Lt. Gustavus Cheyney Doane and a troop of 5 cavalrymen from Fort Ellis to escort the expedition. In 1871, Captain John W. Barlow during his exploration of the Yellowstone region formally named a summit on what would become the southern boundary of the park Mount Hancock to honor the general's decision to provide the escort.

=== Command in the East and political ambitions ===
In 1872, General Meade died, leaving Hancock the army's senior major general. This entitled him to a more prominent command, and President Grant, still desirous to keep Hancock from a Southern post, assigned him command of the Division of the Atlantic, headquartered at Fort Columbus on Governors Island, in New York City. The vast department covered the settled northeast area of the country and was militarily uneventful with the exception of the army's involvement in the Great Railroad Strike of 1877. When railroad workers went on strike to protest wage cuts, the nation's transportation system was paralyzed. The governors of Pennsylvania, West Virginia, and Maryland asked President Hayes to call in federal troops to re-open the railways. Once federal troops entered the cities, most of the strikers melted away, but there were some violent clashes.

All the while Hancock was posted in New York, he did his best to keep his political ambitions alive. He received some votes at the Democrats' 1876 convention, but was never a serious contender as New York governor Samuel J. Tilden swept the field on the second ballot. The Republican candidate, Rutherford B. Hayes, won the election, and Hancock refocused his ambition on 1880. The electoral crisis of 1876 and the subsequent end to Reconstruction in 1877 convinced many observers that the election of 1880 would give the Democrats their best chance at victory in a generation.

== Election of 1880 ==
Hancock after the War
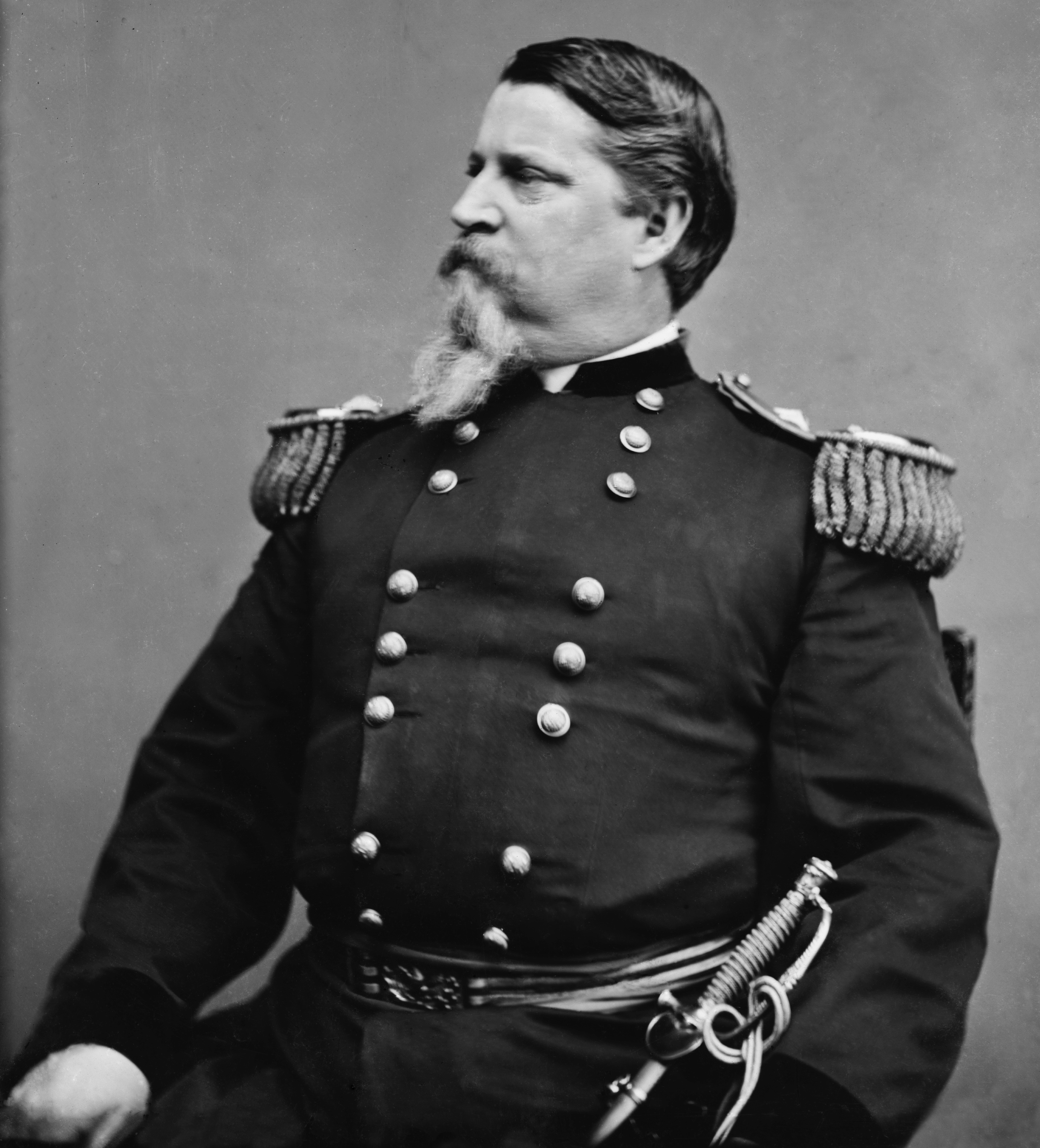

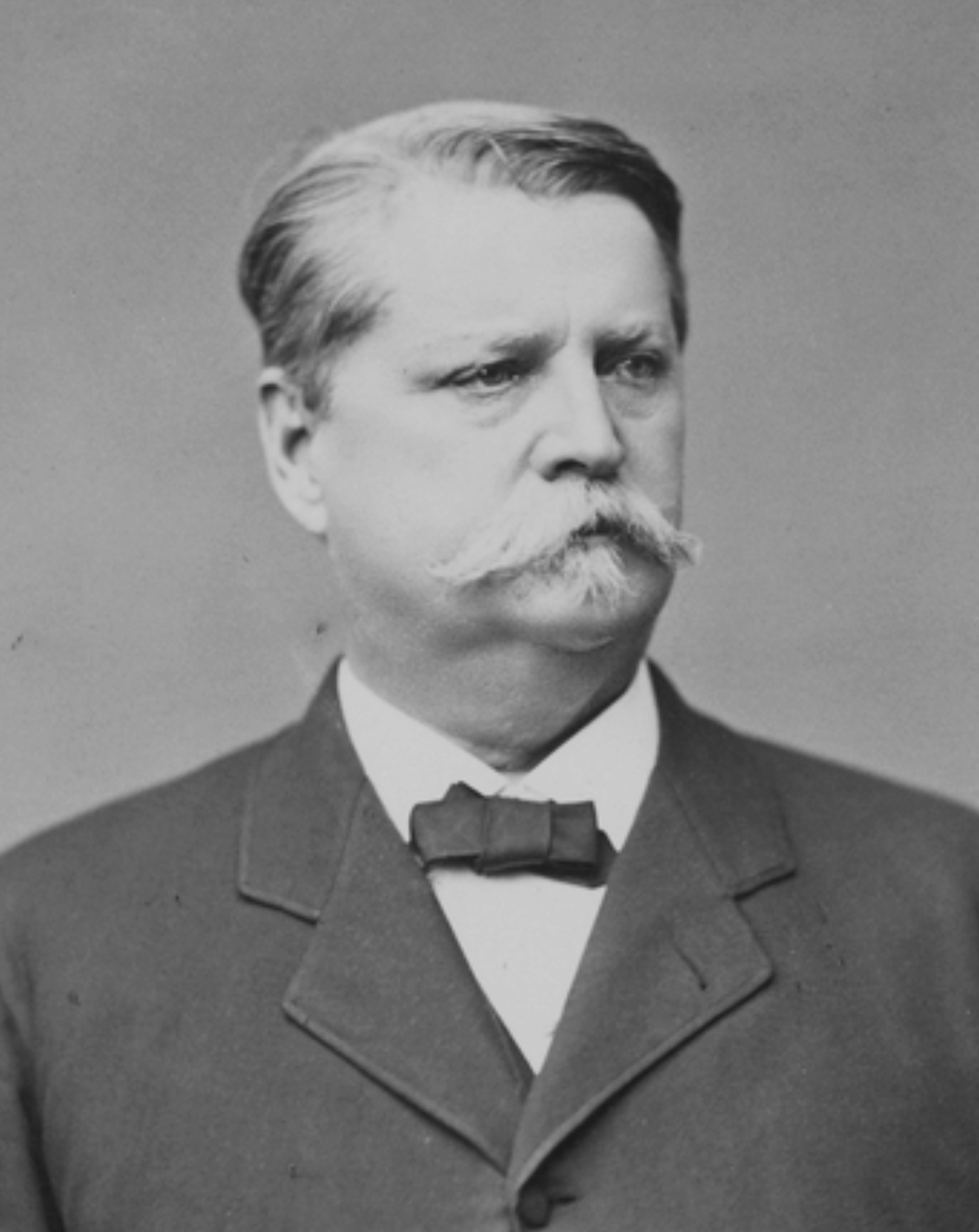

=== Democratic convention ===
Prior to 1880 Hancock's name had been proposed several times for the Democratic nomination for president, but he never captured a majority of delegates. In 1880, however, Hancock's chances improved. President Hayes had promised not to run for a second term, and the previous Democratic nominee, Tilden, declined to run again due to poor health. Hancock faced several competitors for the nomination, including Thomas A. Hendricks, Allen G. Thurman, Stephen Johnson Field, and Thomas F. Bayard. Hancock's neutrality on the monetary question, and his lingering support in the South (owing to his General Order Number 40) meant that Hancock, more than any other candidate, had nationwide support. When the Democratic convention assembled in Cincinnati in June 1880, Hancock led on the first ballot, but did not have a majority. By the second ballot, Hancock received the requisite two-thirds, and William Hayden English of Indiana was chosen as his running mate.

=== Campaign against Garfield ===
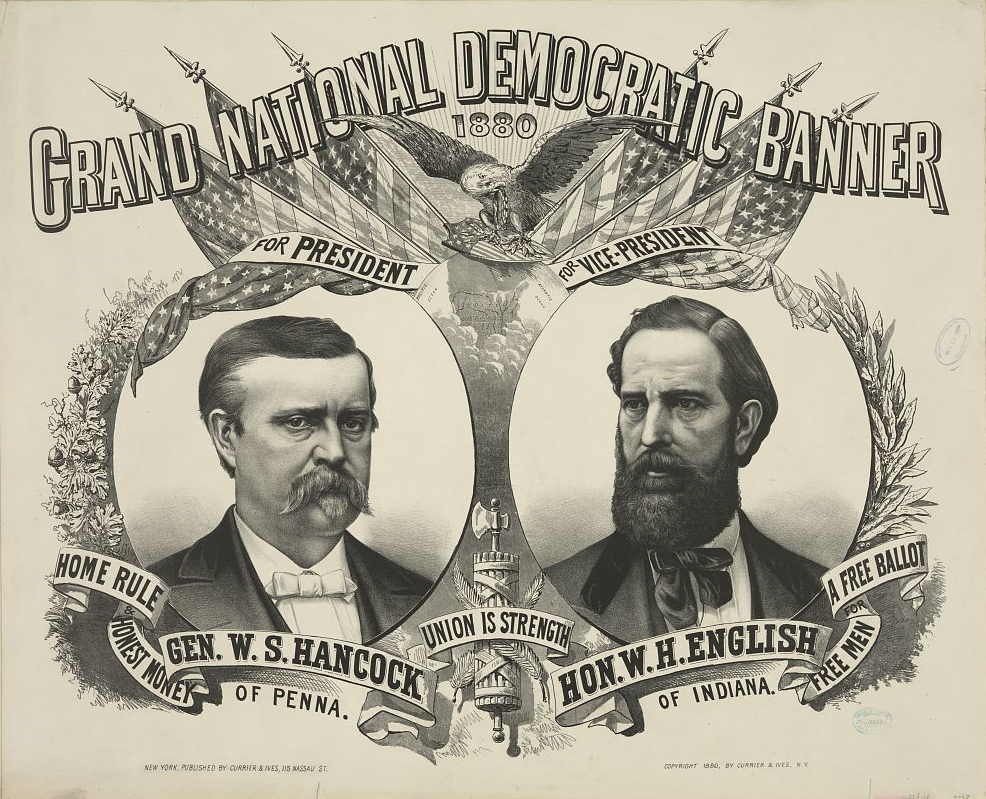
Hancock/English election poster

The Republicans nominated James A. Garfield, a Congressman from Ohio and a skillful politician, as well as a former general from the Civil War. Hancock and the Democrats expected to carry the Solid South, but needed to add a few of the Northern states to their total to win the election. The practical differences between the parties were few, and the Republicans were reluctant to attack Hancock personally because of his heroic reputation. The one policy difference the Republicans were able to exploit was a statement in the Democratic platform endorsing "a tariff for revenue only." Garfield's campaigners used this statement to paint the Democrats as unsympathetic to the plight of industrial laborers, a group that would benefit by a high protective tariff. The tariff issue cut Democratic support in industrialized Northern states, which were essential in establishing a Democratic majority. In the end, the Democrats and Hancock failed to carry any of the Northern states they had targeted, with the exception of New Jersey. Hancock lost the election to Garfield. Garfield polled only 39,213 more votes than Hancock, the popular vote being 4,453,295 for Garfield and 4,414,082 for Hancock. The electoral count, however, had a much larger spread, as Garfield polled 214 electoral votes and Hancock only 155. Garfield would be shot four months into his presidency on July 2, 1881, and would die on September 19, 1881.

== Later life ==
Hancock took his electoral defeat in stride and attended Garfield's inauguration. Following the election, Hancock carried on as commander of the Division of the Atlantic. He was elected president of the National Rifle Association in 1881, explaining that "The object of the NRA is to increase the military strength of the country by making skill in the use of arms as prevalent as it was in the days of the Revolution." Hancock was a Charter Director and the first president of the Military Service Institution of the United States from 1878 until his death in 1886. He was commander-in-chief of the Military Order of the Loyal Legion of the United States veterans organization from 1879 until his death in 1886. He was the author of Reports of Major General W. S. Hancock upon Indian Affairs, published in 1867.

Though he also made a less publicized trip that year to Gettysburg, the last public act performed by Hancock was his oversight of the funeral of Ulysses S. Grant in 1885, and his organizing and leading of Grant's nine-mile funeral procession in New York City. From Grant's home at Mount McGregor, New York, to its resting place in Riverside Park, the casket containing Grant's remains was in the charge of General Hancock. As he appeared on the scene at the commencement of Grant's funeral procession, Hancock was met with a mild applause, but with a gesture he directed a silence and respect for Grant.

Hancock died in 1886 at Governors Island, still in command of the Military Division of the Atlantic, the victim of an infected carbuncle, complicated by diabetes. He is buried in Montgomery Cemetery in West Norriton Township, Pennsylvania, near Norristown, Pennsylvania. Hancock's wife, Almira, published Reminiscences of Winfield Scott Hancock in 1887.

In 1893, Republican General Francis A. Walker wrote,

Although I did not vote for General Hancock, I am strongly disposed to believe that one of the best things the nation has lost in recent years has been the example and the influence of that chivalric, stately, and splendid gentleman in the White House. Perhaps much which both parties now recognize as having been unfortunate and mischievous during the past thirteen years would have been avoided had General Hancock been elected.

His noted integrity was a counterpoint to the corruption of the era, for as President Rutherford B. Hayes said,

If, when we make up our estimate of a public man, conspicuous both as a soldier and in civil life, we are to think first and chiefly of his manhood, his integrity, his purity, his singleness of purpose, and his unselfish devotion to duty, we can truthfully say of Hancock that he was through and through pure gold.

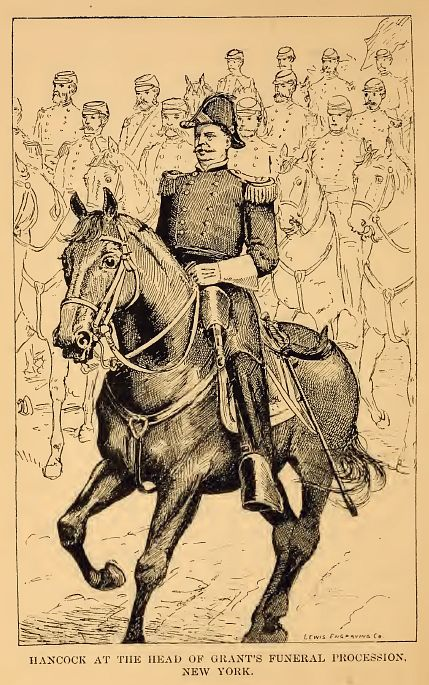
General Winfield Scott Hancock leading Ulysses S. Grant's funeral procession in New York City

== Legacy ==
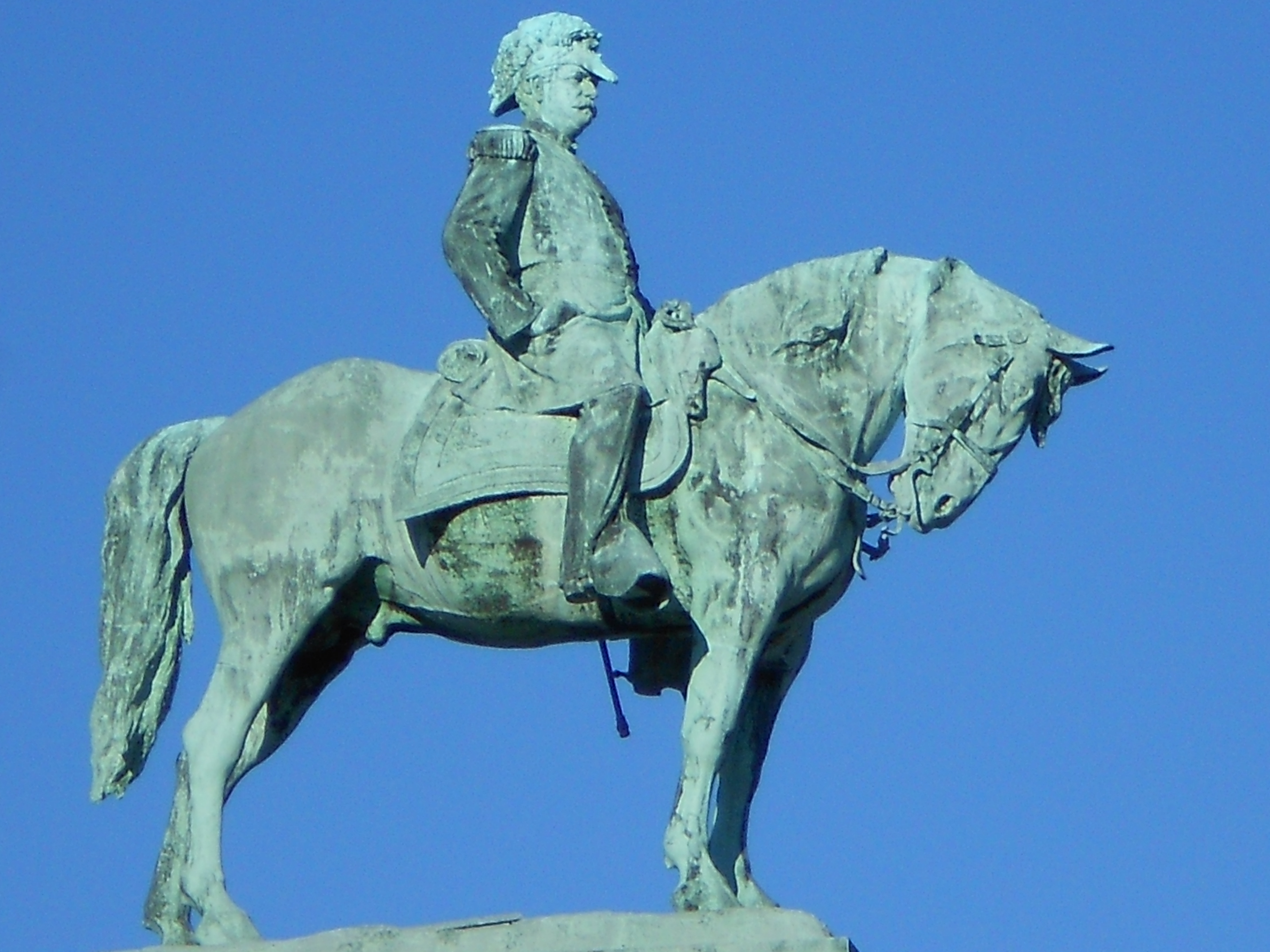
Statue of Hancock on the Smith Memorial Arch in Philadelphia

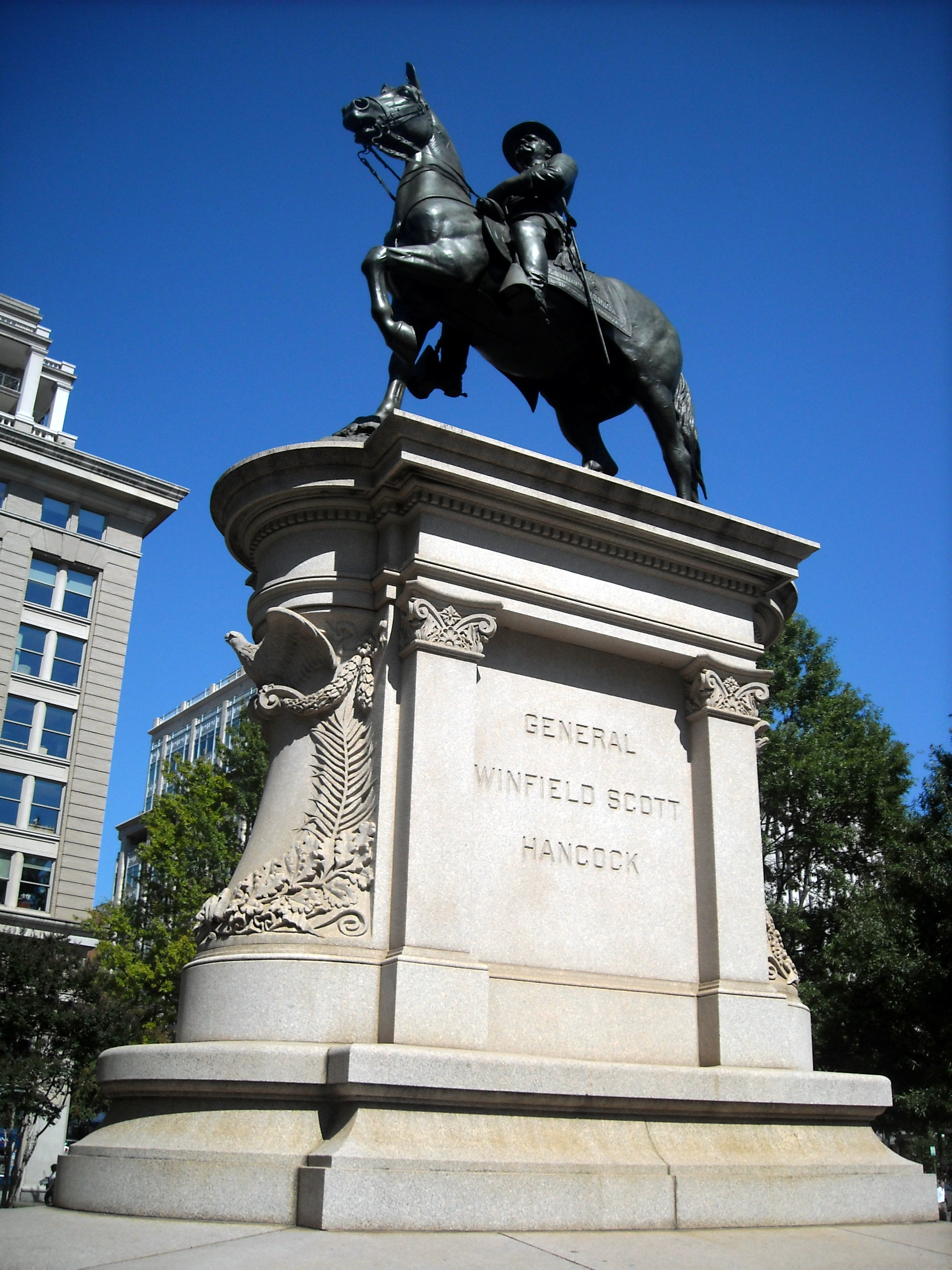
General Winfield Scott Hancock Memorial in Washington, D.C.

Winfield Scott Hancock is memorialized in a number of statues:

- An equestrian statue on East Cemetery Hill on the Gettysburg Battlefield.
- A portrait statue by Cyrus Dallin as part of the Pennsylvania Memorial at Gettysburg.
- An alto-relievo representing Hancock's wounding during Pickett's Charge, on the New York State Monument at Gettysburg. Designed by sculptor Caspar Buberl
- An equestrian statue located at Pennsylvania Avenue and 7th Street, NW in Washington, D.C.
- An equestrian statue atop the Smith Memorial Arch in Fairmount Park, Philadelphia, Pennsylvania.
- A monumental bronze bust in Hancock Square, New York City, by sculptor James Wilson Alexander MacDonald.
- Fort Hancock, Texas
- Fort Hancock on Sandy Hook, New Jersey, was named for General Hancock.

The original Winfield Scott Hancock Elementary School, located at Arch and East Spruce Streets in Norristown, Pennsylvania, was built in 1895 in memory of the General who grew up not far from the site. It was replaced in 1962 by a new building still in use by the Norristown Area School District only a few blocks away at Arch and Summit Streets, which is also named after General Hancock. The original 1895 building still stands and is used by a community non-profit organization.

A Pennsylvania historical marker was dedicated September 11, 1947, along Bethlehem Pike (PA 309), just south of US 202, where Hancock was born.

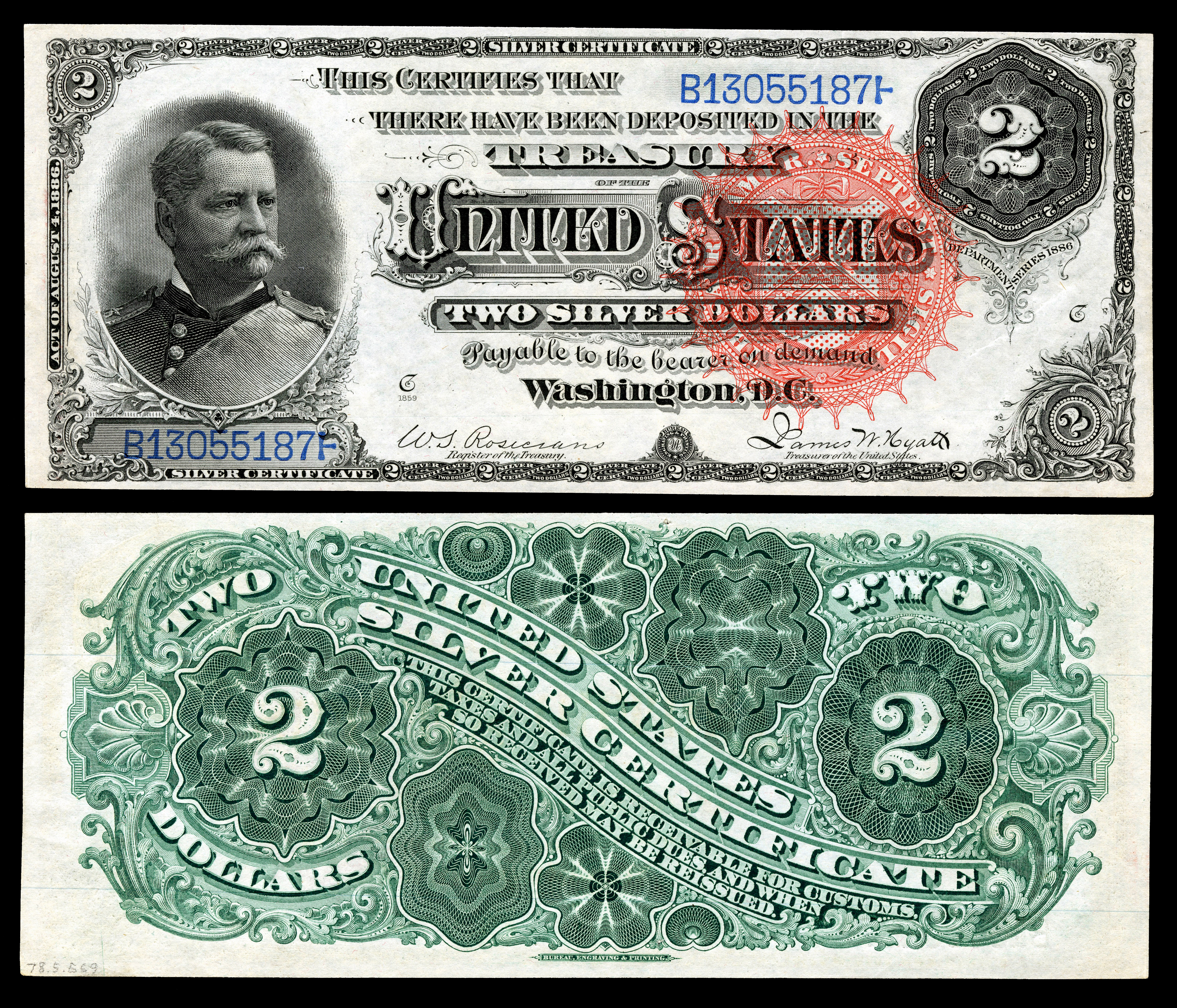
1886 $2 Silver Certificate depicting Hancock

Hancock's portrait adorns U.S. currency on the $2 Silver Certificate series of 1886. Approximately 1,500 to 2,500 of these bills survive today in numismatic collections. Hancock's bill is ranked number 73 on a list of "100 Greatest American Currency Notes".

Hancock was an important character in the Shaara family's Civil War historical novels: The Killer Angels by Michael Shaara, and Gods and Generals and The Last Full Measure by Jeffrey Shaara. In the films Gettysburg (1993) and Gods and Generals (2003), based on the first two of these novels, Hancock is portrayed by Brian Mallon, and is depicted in both films in a very favorable light. A number of scenes in the novel Gods and Generals that depict Hancock and his friend Lewis A. Armistead in Southern California before the war were omitted from the film.

== See also ==
- List of American Civil War generals (Union)
- List of equestrian statues in the District of Columbia
- List of equestrian statues in Pennsylvania

Party political offices
Preceded by Samuel J. Tilden	Democratic nominee for President of the United States; 1880	Succeeded by Grover Cleveland
National Rifle Association of America
Preceded by Henry A. Gildersleeve	President of the NRA; 1881	Succeeded by Edward L. Molineux
