= John Wood (Pennsylvania politician) =

American politician (1816–1898)

John Wood (September 6, 1816 – May 28, 1898) was a Republican member of the U.S. House of Representatives from Pennsylvania.

John Wood (uncle of Alan Wood, Jr.) was born in Philadelphia. He attended the Friends Society schools of Philadelphia, and was employed by his father in the manufacture of tools and agricultural machinery from 1832 to 1840. He was engaged in the manufacture of iron and steel near Wilmington, Delaware, from 1841 to 1844. He moved to Conshohocken, Pennsylvania, in 1844 and engaged in the milling of iron and steel. He was first burgess of Conshohocken.

Wood was elected as a Republican to the Thirty-sixth Congress. He was not a candidate for renomination in 1860. He resumed his former manufacturing pursuits and died in Conshohocken in 1898. He was interred in Montgomery Cemetery in West Norriton Township, Pennsylvania, near Norristown, Pennsylvania.

== Sources ==
- United States Congress. "John Wood (id: W000696)". Biographical Directory of the United States Congress.
- The Political Graveyard

U.S. House of Representatives
Preceded by Owen Jones	Member of the U.S. House of Representatives from Pennsylvania's 5th congressional district 1859-1861	Succeeded by William M. Davis
