= Owen Jones (American politician) =

American politician

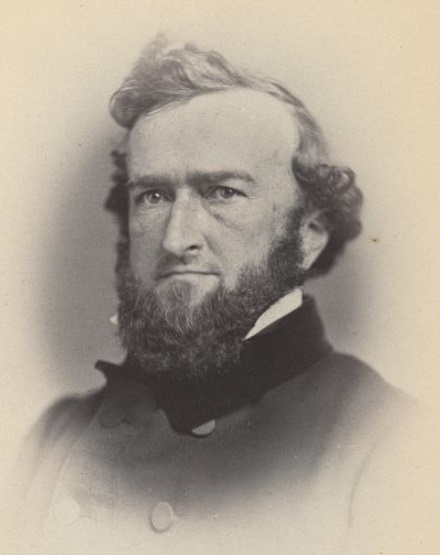

Member of the U.S. House of Representatives from Pennsylvania's 5th district
- In office March 4, 1857 – March 3, 1859
- Preceded by: John Cadwalader
- Succeeded by: John Wood

Personal details
- Born: December 29, 1819 Ardmore, Pennsylvania
- Died: December 25, 1878 (aged 58) Ardmore, Pennsylvania
- Resting place: Laurel Hill Cemetery, Philadelphia, Pennsylvania, US
- Party: Democratic
- Education: University of Pennsylvania

Military service
- Allegiance: Union
- Branch/service: Union Army
- Years of service: 1861–1863
- Rank: Colonel
- Commands: 1st Pennsylvania Cavalry
- Battles/wars: American Civil War; Battle of Dranesville; Battle of Cross Keys; Battle of Cedar Mountain; Second Battle of Bull Run; Battle of Fredericksburg

Owen Jones (December 29, 1819 – December 25, 1878) was an American lawyer and politician from Pennsylvania who served as a Democratic member of the U.S. House of Representatives for Pennsylvania's 5th congressional district for one term from 1857 to 1859.

During the American Civil War he raised a troop of cavalry that would become Company B of the 1st Pennsylvania Cavalry Regiment and served as colonel.

== Early life and education ==
Owen Jones was born on December 29, 1819, near Ardmore, Pennsylvania, to Jonathan and Mary (nee McClenaghan) Jones. He attended the public schools and graduated from the University of Pennsylvania in Philadelphia. He studied law in Philadelphia under William M. Meredith. He was admitted to the bar of Montgomery County, Pennsylvania, in 1842, and commenced practice in Ardmore. He also was active in agriculture and raised animals and worked on the improvement of farming techniques. In 1845, he purchased a former estate in West Philadelphia and realized a huge gain in value. He served as a county commissioner.

== Congress ==
Jones was elected as a Democrat to the Thirty-fifth Congress. While in Congress, he served as chairman of the United States House Committee on Expenditures in the Department of State. He was an unsuccessful candidate for reelection in 1858. He served as a delegate from Pennsylvania for the 1860 Democratic National Conventions.

== Military career ==
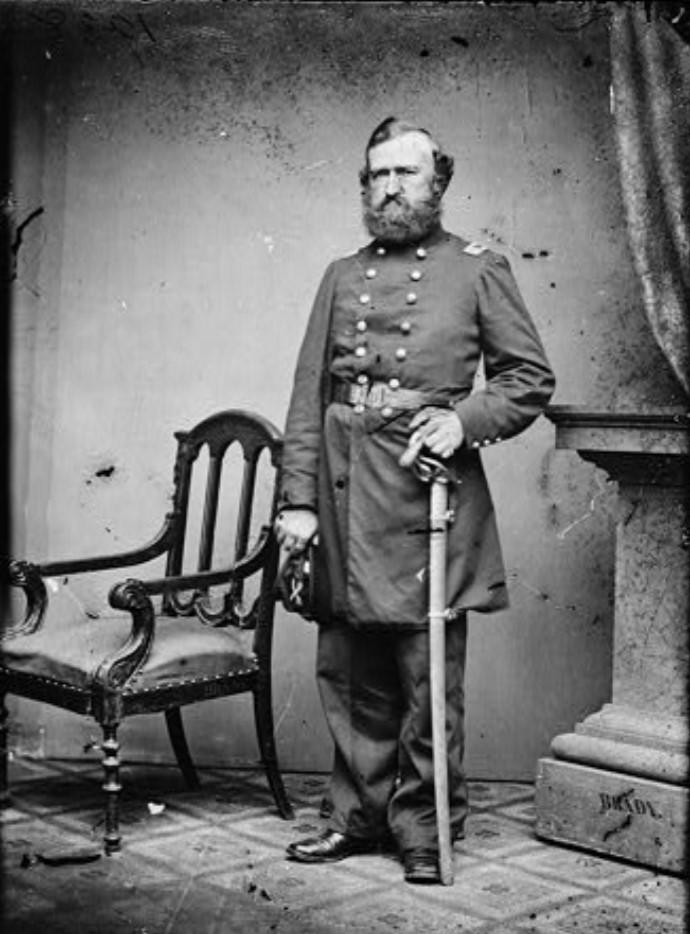
Colonel Owen Jones in Uniform

During the American Civil War, Jones raised a company of cavalry known as the Lower Merion Troop that would become Company B of the 1st Pennsylvania Cavalry Regiment. Jones fought at Dranesville, Battle of Cross Keys, Battle of Cedar Mountain, Second Battle of Bull Run and at Fredericksburg. Jones also took part in the failed offensive attempt to capture Richmond, Virginia known as the Mud March. This was the last engagement that Jones took part in during the Civil War. Jones entered service as a captain, was promoted to major on August 5, 1861, to lieutenant colonel on January 3, 1862, and to colonel on May 5, 1862. He resigned his commission in October 1863 and returned home to practice law near Ardmore.

== Personal life ==
Jones married Mary Roberts and together they had two children.

Jones lived in a mansion built in 1803 that he named Wynne Wood in honor of the link between the Wynne and Jones families. The mansion burned down in 1858 and was rebuilt. The name Wynnewood is used for the surrounding community of Wynnewood, Pennsylvania and Wynnewood railroad station. The former estate is now part of the Merion Cricket Club.

== Death and burial ==
He died on December 25, 1879. He was found dead while walking to his neighbor's house for a social engagement. The reported cause of death was apoplexy. He was interred in Laurel Hill Cemetery in Philadelphia.

== Citations ==
U.S. House of Representatives
Preceded by John Cadwalader	Member of the U.S. House of Representatives from Pennsylvania's 5th congressional district 1857–1859	Succeeded by John Wood
