= Jacob Fry Jr. =

American politician

10th Auditor General of Pennsylvania
- In office 1857–1860
- Governor: James Pollock; William F. Packer
- Preceded by: Ephraim Banks
- Succeeded by: Thomas E. Cochran

Member of the U.S. House of Representatives from Pennsylvania's 5th district
- In office March 4, 1835 – March 3, 1839
- Preceded by: Joel Keith Mann
- Succeeded by: Joseph Fornance

Member of the Pennsylvania House of Representatives
- In office 1853-1854

Personal details
- Born: June 10, 1802 Trappe, Pennsylvania
- Died: November 28, 1866 (aged 64) Trappe, Pennsylvania
- Party: Jacksonian; Democratic

Jacob Fry Jr. (June 10, 1802 – November 28, 1866) was a Jacksonian and Democratic member of the U.S. House of Representatives from the Commonwealth of Pennsylvania in the United States.

== Formative years ==
Jacob Fry Jr. was born in Trappe, Pennsylvania on June 10, 1802. He taught school in Trappe, and served as the clerk of courts of Montgomery County, Pennsylvania, from 1830 to 1833.

== Career ==
Fry was elected as a Jacksonian to the Twenty-fourth Congress and reelected as a Democrat to the Twenty-fifth Congress. He was not a candidate for renomination in 1838.

He subsequently engaged in the mercantile business in Trappe. In 1853 and 1854, he was elected as a member of the Pennsylvania House of Representatives. He then served as Pennsylvania Auditor General from 1857 to 1860 before resuming his mercantile work.

== Death and interment ==
Fry died in Trappe in 1866, and was interred in the Augustus Lutheran Church Cemetery.

== Sources ==
- United States Congress. "Jacob Fry Jr. (id: F000396)". Biographical Directory of the United States Congress.
- The Political Graveyard

U.S. House of Representatives
| Preceded by Joel K. Mann | Member of the U.S. House of Representatives from Pennsylvania's 5th congressional district 1835–1839 | Succeeded by Joseph Fornance |
Political offices
| Preceded by Ephraim Banks | Pennsylvania Auditor General; 1857–1860 | Succeeded by Thomas E. Cochran |
