= Riverside Cemetery (West Norriton Township, Pennsylvania) =

Cemetery in Montgomery County, Pennsylvania

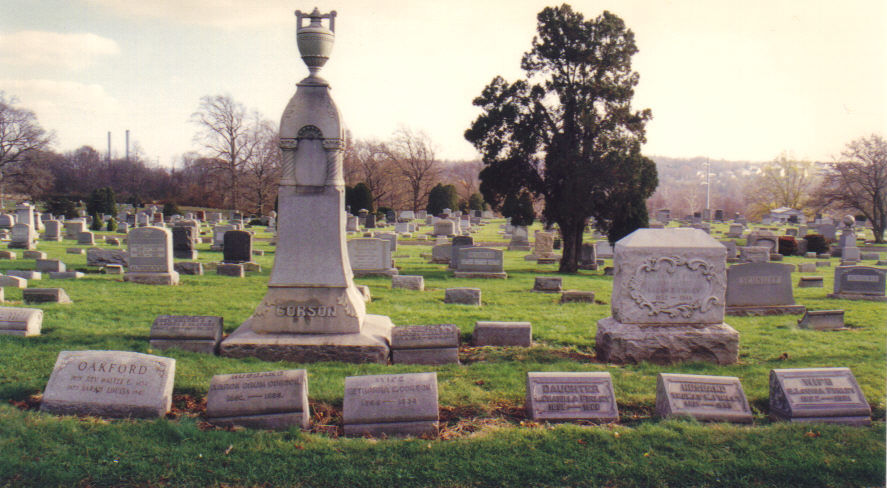
- Riverside Cemetery
- Interactive map of Riverside Cemetery

Details
- Established: 1894
- Location: West Norriton Township, Pennsylvania, near Norristown, Pennsylvania
- Country: United States
- Coordinates: 40°07′11″N 75°22′07″W
- Type: private
- Owned by: StoneMor
- No. of graves: >14,000
- Website: Riverside Cemetery
- Find a Grave: Riverside Cemetery

Riverside Cemetery is a cemetery located in West Norriton Township, Pennsylvania, United States, near the western edge of Norristown, Pennsylvania. It was established in 1894.

== Notable interments ==
- William Jordan Bolton (1833–1906), Brevet Brigadier General in American Civil War. Commander of the 51st Pennsylvania Infantry Regiment
- Roy Thomas (1874–1959), Major League Baseball Player.
- Lloyd H. Wood (1896–1964), 20th Lieutenant Governor of Pennsylvania from 1951 to 1955

== See also ==
- Montgomery Cemetery (West Norriton Township, Pennsylvania) – the historic cemetery which adjoins Riverside Cemetery
