= Montgomery Cemetery =

Historic cemetery in Montgomery County, Pennsylvania

- Front gates of Montgomery Cemetery
- Interactive map of Montgomery Cemetery

Details
- Established: 1848
- Location: West Norriton Township, Pennsylvania, U.S.
- Country: United States
- Coordinates: 40°07′09″N 75°21′55″W
- Type: Private
- Owned by: Historical Society of Montgomery County, Pennsylvania
- Size: 29.9 acres (121,000 m^{2})
- No. of graves: >5,500
- Website: www.hsmcpa.org/cemetery.html
- Find a Grave: Montgomery Cemetery
- The Political Graveyard: Montgomery Cemetery

Montgomery Cemetery is a historic cemetery located near the Schuylkill River on Hartranft Avenue and along Jackson Street in West Norriton Township, Pennsylvania, immediately adjacent to and southwest of the Municipality of Norristown.

Founded in the late 1840s, the cemetery is the final resting place of several high-ranking Civil War officers and former governors of Pennsylvania. The cemetery is adjacent to Riverside Cemetery, which was founded a half century later, during the fin de siècle era of the 19th century. The cemetery is currently administered by the Historical Society of Montgomery County, Pennsylvania, located in Norristown, Pennsylvania.

== Origins and history ==
The Montgomery Cemetery Company, which originally owned and maintained the cemetery, was incorporated by act of the Pennsylvania General Assembly on April 10, 1848. The initial members of the cemetery company were William Hamil, John R. Cooken, Adam Slemmer, Henry Freedley, James Wells, Abraham Markley, John Freedley, and Joseph Fornance, with the first five being trustees. The 29.7 acres (120,000 m^{2}) of land for the cemetery had been sold to the company on March 31, 1848, by one of the trustees, William Hamil, and his wife Willimina. The first burials in the cemetery ensued shortly thereafter.

The cemetery was originally a part of Norriton Township when the cemetery company was incorporated. When the then-Borough of Norristown annexed the land immediately to the northeast of the cemetery in 1853, the cemetery's land, including the road leading to the cemetery (now Hartranft Avenue), was specifically omitted from the annexation. However, the cemetery company's land along and beside Hartranft Avenue, not including the cemetery itself, became a part of the then-Borough of Norristown on January 18, 1909. Less than two months later, the cemetery itself became a part of West Norriton Township after Norriton Township was divided on March 9, 1909.

== Notable interments ==
- Joseph Fornance (1804–1852), member of the U.S. House of Representatives
- John Freedley (1793–1851), member of the U.S. House of Representatives
- Winfield Scott Hancock (1824–1886), General during the American Civil War and the Democratic nominee for President of the United States in 1880
- John F. Hartranft (1830–1889), Governor of Pennsylvania and General during the American Civil War
- Adam J. Slemmer (1828–1868), officer during the American Civil War
- John Wood (1816–1898), member of the U.S. House of Representatives
- Samuel K. Zook (1821–1863), General during the American Civil War; mortally wounded at the Battle of Gettysburg

== See also ==
- Riverside Cemetery (West Norriton Township, Pennsylvania) – the modern cemetery which adjoins the Montgomery Cemetery
