= 57th New York Infantry Regiment =

- Active: August 12, 1861, to December 6, 1864
- Country: United States
- Allegiance: Union
- Branch: Union Army
- Type: Infantry
- Engagements: Siege of Yorktown; Battle of Seven Pines; Seven Days Battles; Battle of Antietam; Battle of Fredericksburg; Battle of Chancellorsville; Battle of Gettysburg; Bristoe Campaign; Mine Run Campaign; Battle of the Wilderness; Battle of Spotsylvania Court House; Battle of Cold Harbor; Siege of Petersburg; Second Battle of Petersburg; Battle of Jerusalem Plank Road; First Battle of Deep Bottom; Second Battle of Deep Bottom; Second Battle of Ream's Station

The 57th New York Infantry Regiment (or National Guard Rifles) was an infantry regiment in the Union Army during the American Civil War.

== Service ==
The 57th New York Infantry was organized at New York City, New York beginning August 12, 1861, and mustered in for three years service on November 19, 1861, under the command of Colonel Samuel K. Zook.

The regiment was attached to French's 3rd Brigade, Sumner's Division, Army of the Potomac, to March 1862. 3rd Brigade, 1st Division, II Corps, Army of the Potomac, to June 1864. Consolidated Brigade, 1st Division, II Corps, to November 1864.

The 57th New York Infantry mustered out of service by companies beginning July 14, 1864. Recruits and veterans were transferred to the 61st New York Infantry and the regiment officially ceased to exist on December 6, 1864.

== Detailed service ==
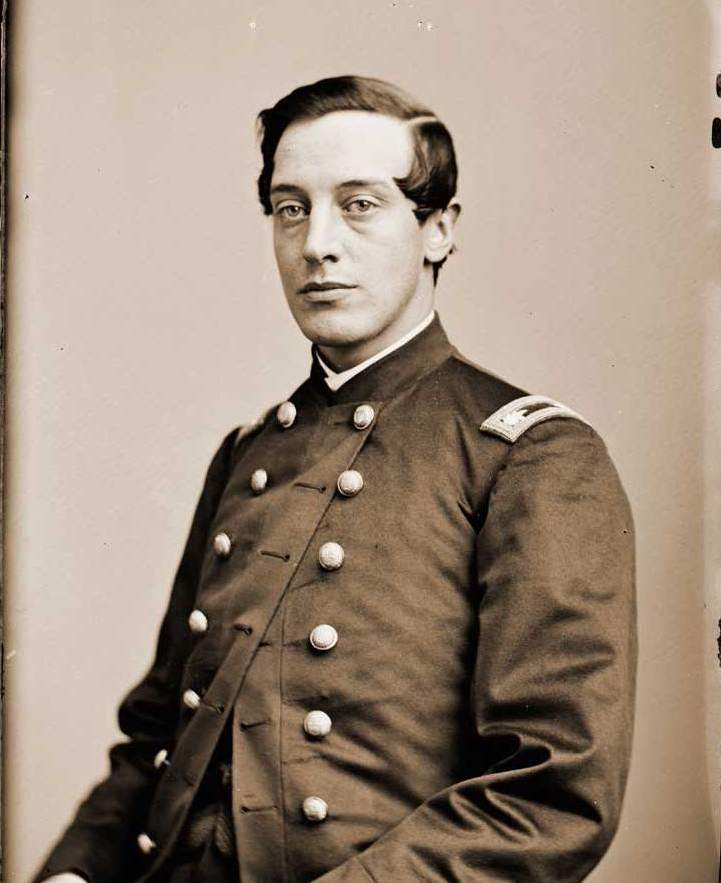
Lieutenant Colonel Alford B. Chapman

Left New York for Washington, D.C., November 19, 1861. Duty in the defenses of Washington, D.C., until March 1862. Advance on Manassas, Va., March 10. Reconnaissance to Cedar Run March 14–16. Ordered to the Peninsula, Va. Siege of Yorktown, Va., April 5-May 4. Battle of Seven Pines or Fair Oaks May 31-June 1. Seven Days before Richmond June 25-July 1. Battles of Gaines Mill June 27, Peach Orchard and Savage Station June 29, White Oak Swamp and Glendale June 30, Malvern Hill July 1. At Harrison's Landing until August 16. Movement to Fortress Monroe, then to Alexandria and Centreville August 16–30. Cover Pope's retreat to Washington August 31-September 1. Maryland Campaign September 6–22. Sharpsburg, Md., September 15. Battle of Antietam September 16–17. Duty at Harper's Ferry, Va., September 22-October 29. Reconnaissance to Charlestown October 16–17. Advance up Loudoun Valley and movement to Falmouth, Va., October 29-November 17. Battle of Fredericksburg December 12–15. "Mud March" January 20–24, 1863. At Falmouth until April 27. Chancellorsville Campaign April 27-May 6. Battle of Chancellorsville May 1–5. Gettysburg Campaign June 11-July 24. Battle of Gettysburg July 1–4. Duty on line of the Rappahannock until October. Advance from the Rappahannock to the Rapidan September 13–17. Bristoe Campaign October 9–22. Auburn and Bristoe October 14. Advance to line of the Rappahannock November 7–8. Mine Run Campaign November 26-December 2. Demonstration on the Rapidan February 6–7, 1864. At and near Stevensburg, Va., until May. Campaign from the Rapidan to the James May 3-June 15. Battles of the Wilderness May 5–7. Spotsylvania May 8–12. Spotsylvania Court House May 12–21. Assault on the Salient or "Bloody Angle" May 12. North Anna River May 23–26. On line of the Pamunkey May 26–28. Totopotomoy May 28–31. Cold Harbor June 1–12. Before Petersburg June 16–18. Siege of Petersburg June 16 to December 6, 1864. Jerusalem Plank Road June 22–23. Demonstration north of the James July 27–29. Deep Bottom July 27–28. Demonstration north of the James August 13–20. Deep Bottom, August 14–18. Ream's Station August 25.

== Casualties ==
The regiment lost a total of 194 men during service; 8 officers and 95 enlisted men killed or mortally wounded, 1 officer and 90 enlisted men died of disease.

== Commanders ==
- Colonel Samuel K. Zook - mortally wounded in action at the Battle of Gettysburg, July 2 while in command of a brigade
- Colonel James W. Britt
- Lieutenant Colonel Philip S. Parisen - commanded at the Battle of Antietam where he was killed in action
- Lieutenant Colonel Alford B. Chapman - commanded at the Battle of Antietam after Lieutenant Colonel Philip S. Parisen was killed in action; commanded at the Battle of Gettysburg while serving as lieutenant colonel; killed in action at the Battle of the Wilderness

== See also ==
- List of New York Civil War regiments
- New York in the Civil War
- 61st New York Volunteer Infantry Regiment
