= Norristown Area School District =

School district in Pennsylvania, United States

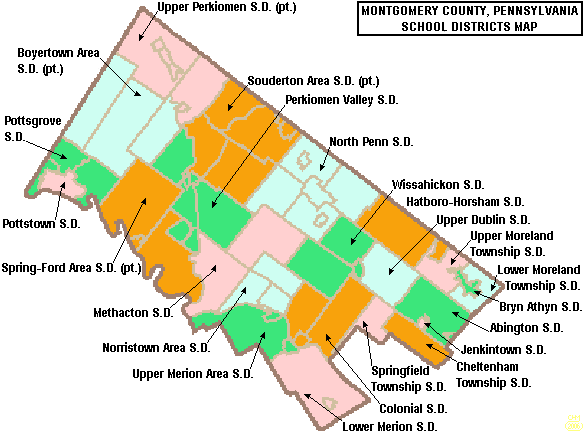
Map of Montgomery County, Pennsylvania Public School Districts. Norristown Area School District is in pale green in the central part of the county.

Norristown Area School District is a school district located in Montgomery County, Pennsylvania. The school district serves the borough of Norristown, East Norriton Township, and West Norriton Township municipalities in central Montgomery County, just north-west of Philadelphia.

The district is compiled of six elementary schools, three middle schools, and two high schools. As of the 2018-2019 academic year, Christopher Dormer is the superintendent for this district.

== Schools ==
- Musselman Learning Center
- Cole Manor Elementary School
- Davenport Elementary School
- W.S. Hancock Elementary School
- Marshall Street Elementary School
- Paul V. Fly Elementary School
- Whitehall Elementary School
- East Norriton Middle School
- Eisenhower Science and Technology Leadership Academy
- Blockson Middle School
- Norristown Area High School
- Roosevelt Alternative School

== Board of school directors ==
The nine member board are elected at-large that serve 4-year terms. They are elected by voters in East Norriton, Norristown, and West Norriton as of 2026.
