= West Norriton Township, Pennsylvania =

Township in Pennsylvania, US

West Norriton Township
- Township
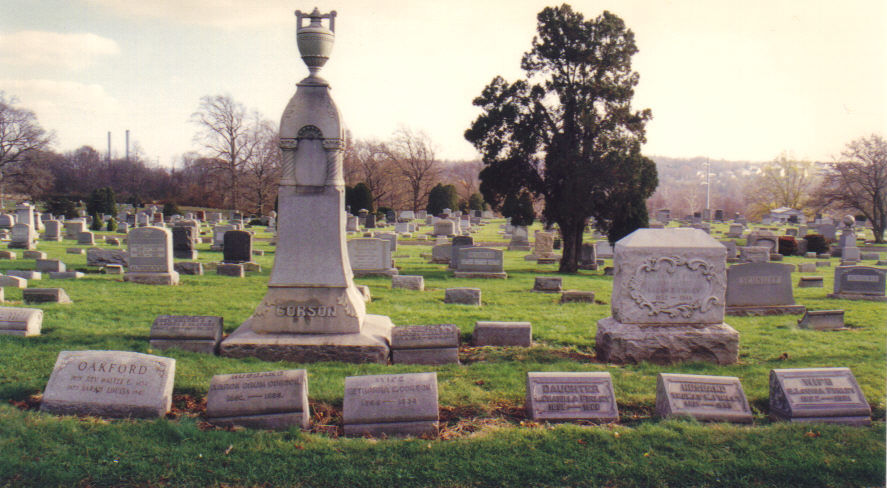
- Riverside Cemetery

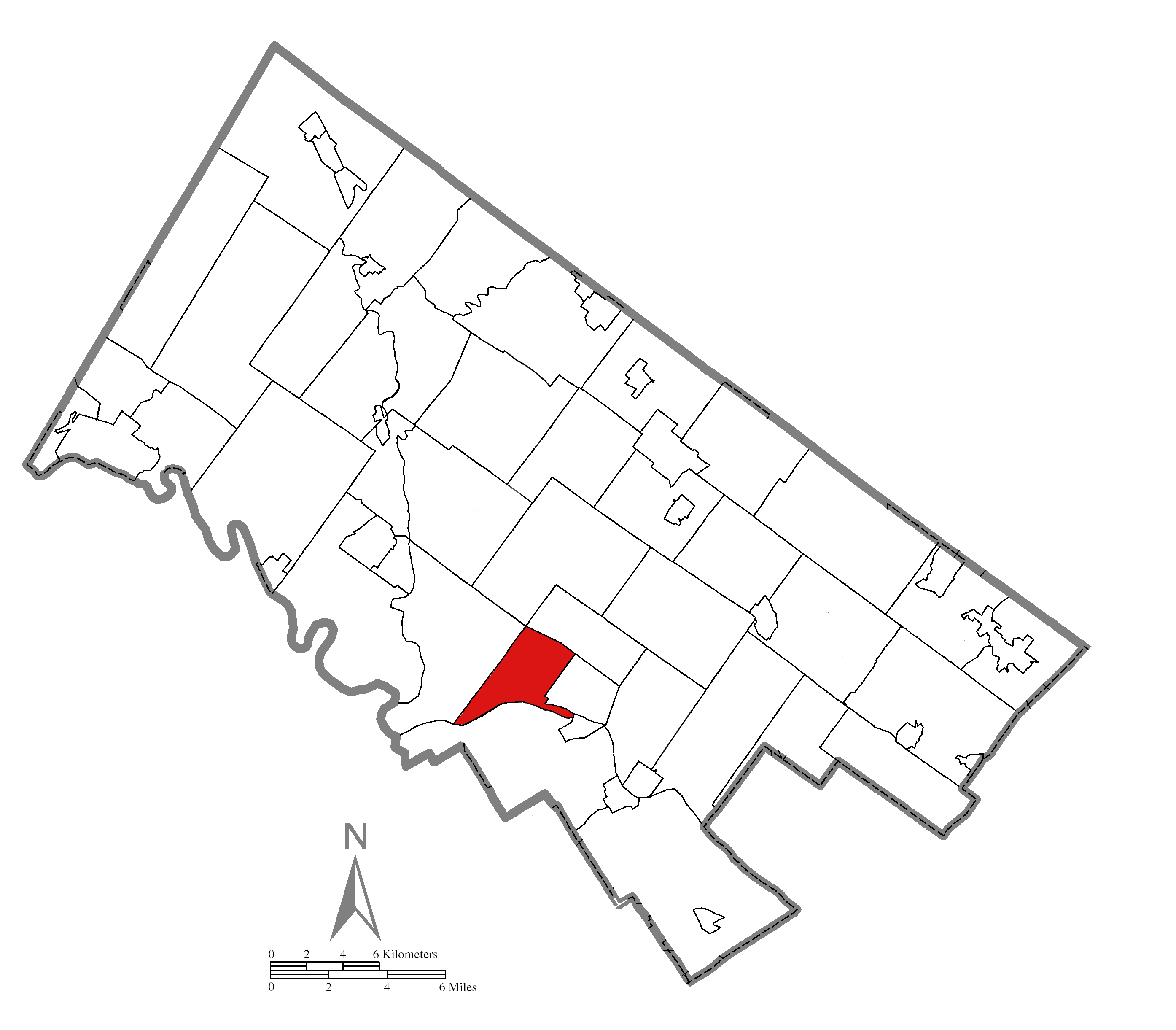
- Location of West Norriton Township in Montgomery County, Pennsylvania
- Coordinates: 40°07′24″N 75°22′59″W
- Country: United States
- State: Pennsylvania
- County: Montgomery

Area
  - Total: 6.22 sq mi (16.11 km^{2})
  - Land: 5.88 sq mi (15.24 km^{2})
  - Water: 0.34 sq mi (0.87 km^{2})
- Elevation: 177 ft (54 m)

Population (2010)
  - Total: 15,663
  - Estimate (2016): 15,766
  - Density: 2,678.6/sq mi (1,034.21/km^{2})
- Time zone: UTC−5 (EST)
  - Summer (DST): UTC−4 (EDT)
- Area code: 610
- FIPS code: 42-091-83696
- Website: www.westnorritontwp.org

West Norriton Township is a township that is located in Montgomery County, Pennsylvania, United States. It is part of the Norristown Area School District.

The population of the township was 15,663 at the time of the 2010 census.

== History ==
On March 9, 1909, Norriton Township was divided into East Norriton and West Norriton townships.

== Geography ==
According to the U.S. Census Bureau, the township has a total area of 6.2 square miles (16 km^{2}), 5.9 square miles (15 km^{2}) of which is land and 0.3 square miles (0.78 km^{2}), or 5.03%, of which is water.

== Transportation ==
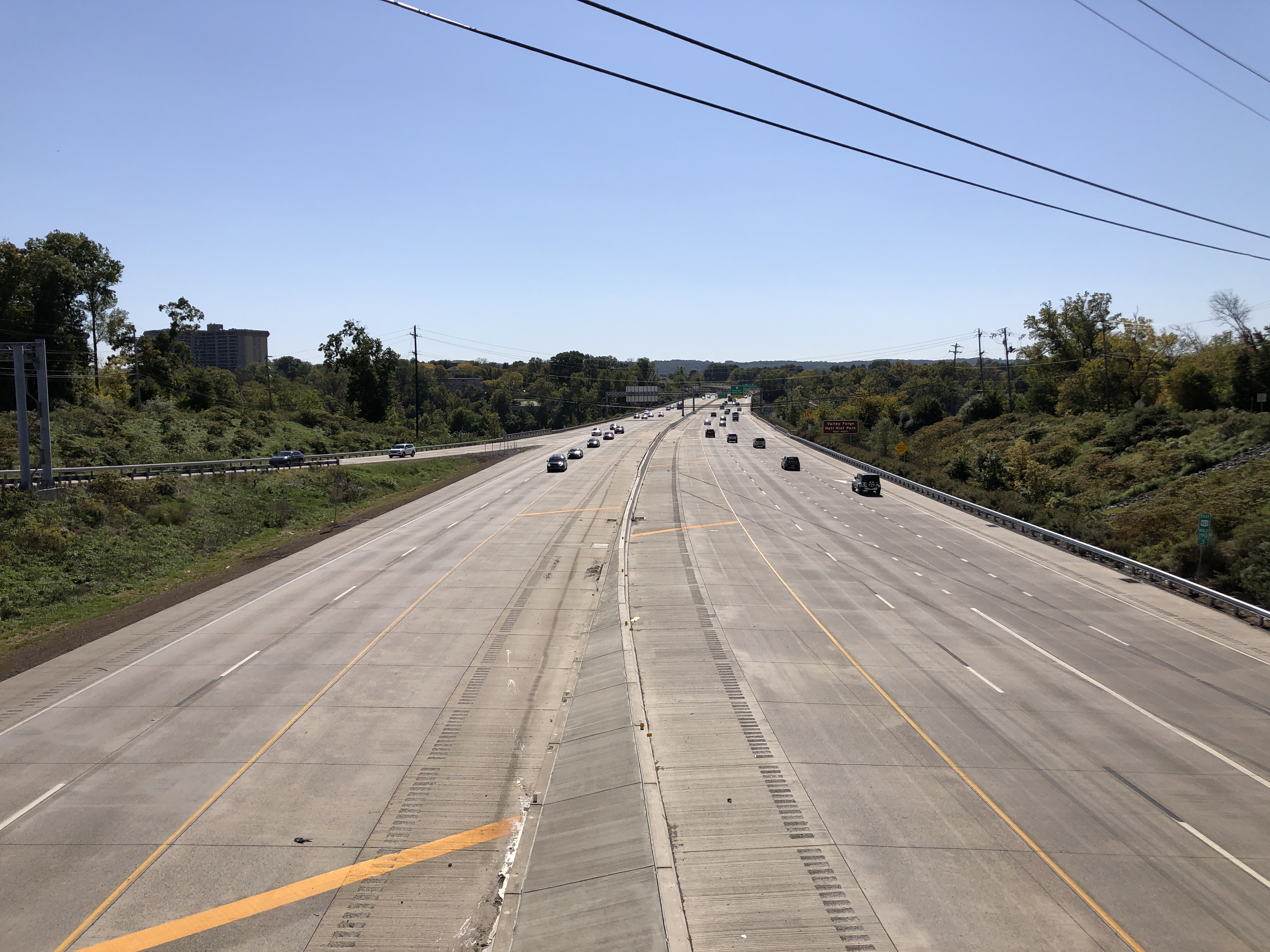
US 422 eastbound in West Norriton Township

As of 2018, there were 50.88 miles (81.88 km) of public roads in West Norriton Township, of which 12.74 miles (20.50 km) were maintained by the Pennsylvania Department of Transportation (PennDOT) and 38.14 miles (61.38 km) were maintained by the township.

U.S. Route 422 is the most prominent highway serving West Norriton, briefly passing through the southwestern corner. Pennsylvania Route 363 interchanges with US 422 and heads northeast along Trooper Road before veering northwest out of the township.

SEPTA provides Suburban Bus service to West Norriton Township along routes 91, 93, 99, and 131, connecting the township to the Norristown Transportation Center in Norristown and other suburbs.

== Demographics ==
Historical population
Census	Pop.	Note	%±
1930	2,588		—
1940	3,016		16.5%
1950	4,879		61.8%
1960	8,342		71.0%
1970	12,456		49.3%
1980	14,034		12.7%
1990	15,209		8.4%
2000	14,901		−2.0%
2010	15,663		5.1%
2020	16,201		3.4%
U.S. Decennial Census

As of the 2010 census, the township was 81.1% White, 9.0% Black or African American, 0.1% Native American, 5.2% Asian, 0.1% Native Hawaiian and Other Pacific Islander, and 1.7% were two or more races. 3.1% of the population were of Hispanic or Latino ancestry.

As of the census of 2000, there were 14,901 people, 6,614 households, and 3,842 families residing in the township.

The population density was 2,543.9 inhabitants per square mile (982.2/km^{2}). There were 6,890 housing units at an average density of 1,176.3 per square mile (454.2/km^{2}).

The racial makeup of the township was 89.49% White, 6.10% African American, 0.07% Native American, 2.73% Asian, 0.05% Pacific Islander, 0.48% from other races, and 1.07% from two or more races. Hispanic or Latino of any race were 1.58% of the population.

There were 6,614 households, out of which 22.2% had children who were under the age of eighteen living with them; 47.7% were married couples living together, 7.7% had a female householder with no husband present, and 41.9% were non-families. Out of all of the households that were documented, 33.3% were made up of individuals, and 10.6% had someone living alone who was sixty-five years of age or older.

The average household size was 2.23 and the average family size was 2.90.

Within the township, the population was spread out, with 19.0% of residents who were under the age of 18, 6.7% from 18 to 24, 35.0% from 25 to 44, 23.7% from 45 to 64, and 15.5% who were 65 years of age or older. The median age was 39 years.

For every one hundred females, there were 91.9 males. For every one hundred females who were aged eighteen or older, there were 86.7 males.

The median income for a household in the township was $55,086, and the median income for a family was $65,701. Males had a median income of $44,211 compared with that of $37,192 for females.

The per capita income for the township was $28,497.

Approximately 2.1% of families and 3.1% of the population were living below the poverty line, including 2.0% of those who were under the age of eighteen and 6.4% of those ao were aged sixty-five or older.

== Government and politics ==
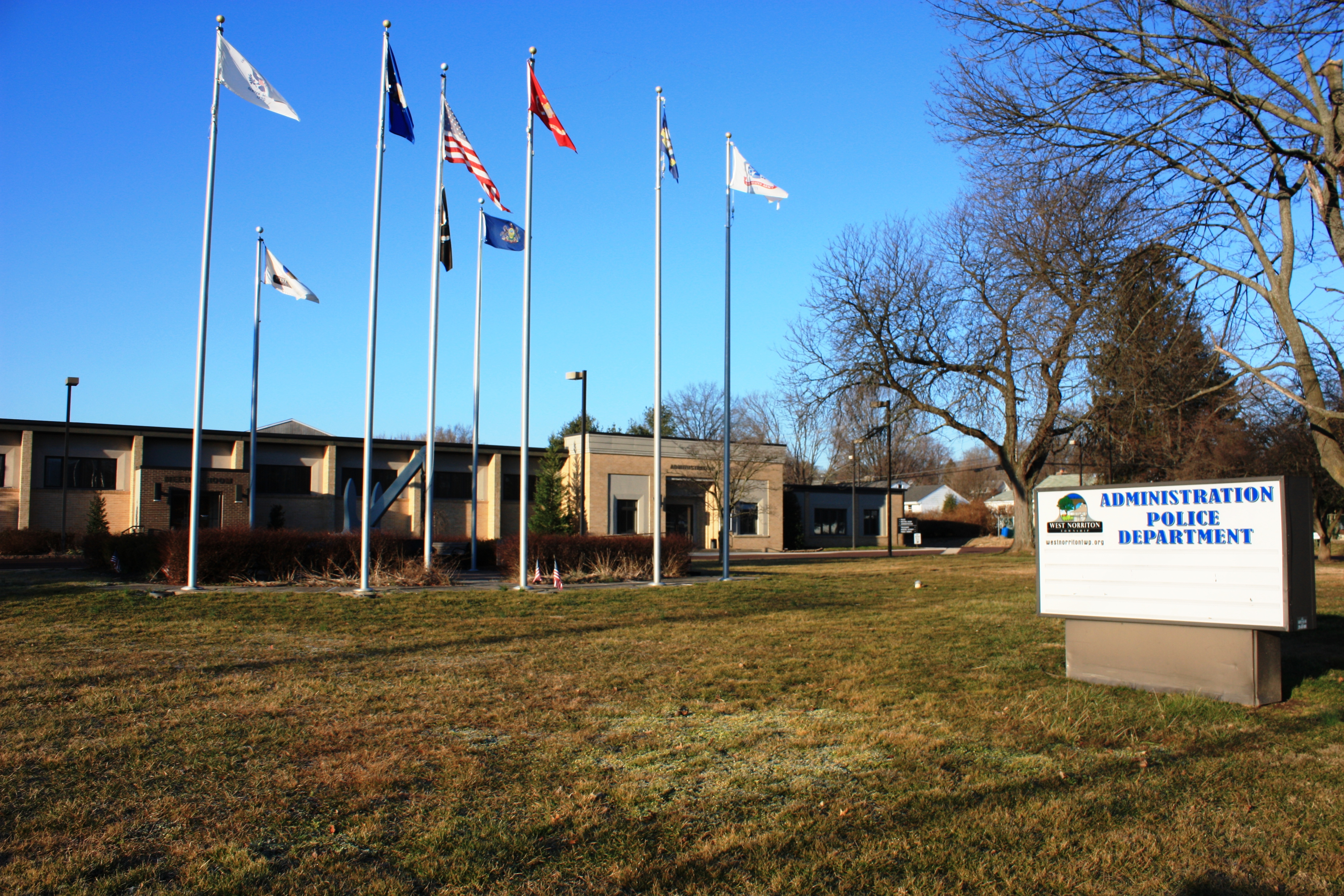
West Norriton Township Building

Presidential elections results
Year	Republican	Democratic
2024	36.4% 3,664	62.6% 6,298
2020	36.5% 3,652	62.5% 6,250
2016	39.2% 3,392	56.2% 4,861
2012	41.3% 3,367	57.7% 4,705
2008	39.7% 3,344	59.3% 4,991
2004	44.2% 3,510	55.4% 4,403
2000	45.1% 2,989	52.7% 3,493
1996	42.4% 2,502	46.5% 2,741
1992	43.2% 2,857	37.6% 2,481

== Cemeteries ==
- Montgomery Cemetery
- Riverside Cemetery

== Education ==
Norristown Area School District is the area school district.

The Roman Catholic Archdiocese of Philadelphia operates Visitation B.V.M. School in West Norriton Township. near but not in the Trooper census-designated place. Mother Teresa Regional Catholic School in King of Prussia is another local Catholic school. Mother Teresa was formed in 2012 by the merger of St. Teresa of Avila in West Norriton and Mother of Divine Providence in King of Prussia.
