= Matt Ammendola =

American gridiron football player (born 1996)

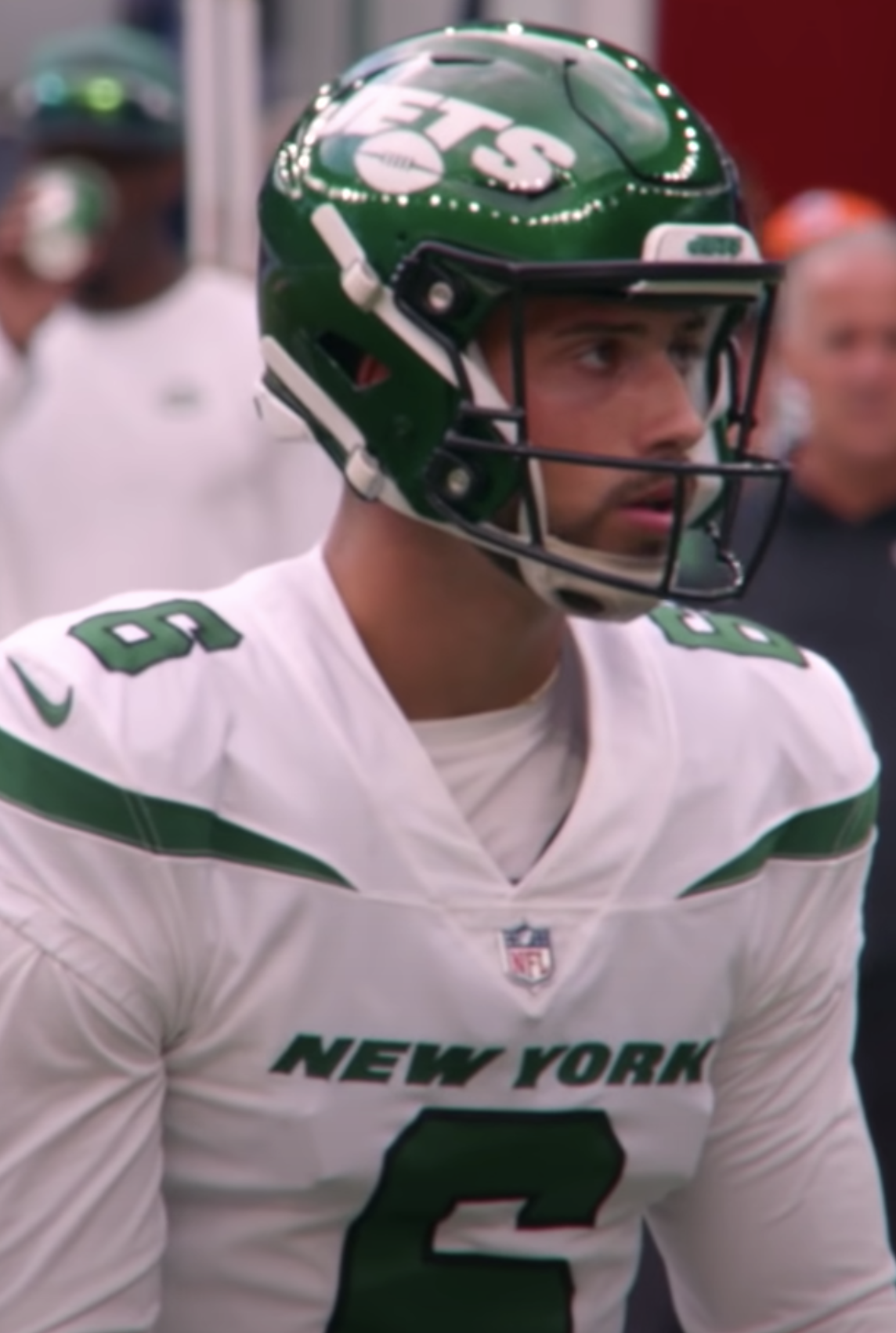
- Ammendola with the New York Jets in 2021

Profile
- Position: Kicker

Personal information
- Born: December 11, 1996 (age 29); Lansdale, Pennsylvania, U.S.
- Listed height: 5 ft 10 in (1.78 m)
- Listed weight: 195 lb (88 kg)

Career information
- High school: North Penn (Towamencin Township, Pennsylvania)
- College: Oklahoma State (2015–2019)
- NFL draft: 2020: undrafted

Career history
- Carolina Panthers (2021)*; New York Jets (2021); Houston Texans (2022)*; Kansas City Chiefs (2022); Arizona Cardinals (2022); Green Bay Packers (2022)*; Houston Texans (2023); San Antonio Brahmas (2024)*; Toronto Argonauts (2026)*
- * Offseason or practice squad member only

Career NFL statistics
- Field goals made: 24
- Field goal attempts: 35
- Field goal %: 68.6
- Longest field goal: 49
- Touchbacks: 55
- Stats at Pro Football Reference
- Stats at CFL.ca

Matthew Ammendola (born December 11, 1996) is an American professional football placekicker. He played college football at Oklahoma State. After college, he signed with the Carolina Panthers, but later signed and played for the New York Jets, Kansas City Chiefs, Arizona Cardinals, and Houston Texans after going undrafted in the 2020 NFL draft.

== Early life ==
Ammendola was born in Lansdale, Pennsylvania, and attended North Penn High School. He kicked a school-record 56-yard kick. The previous school-record longest field goal was held by Jacksonville Jaguars placekicker Brandon McManus. Ammendola made nine field goals in 2014, which is a school-record. He made seven field goals the year before. Ammendola had 41 kickoffs into the end zone in 2014.

== College career ==
Ammendola averaged 65.1 yards and kicked off 88 times for 51 touchbacks in his freshman year. Oklahoma State led the nation in opponent starting field position thanks to Ammendola's kickoffs. He made his only attempt of his freshman year, which was a 53-yard field goal against Central Michigan.

Ammendola made 23 field goals in his sophomore year, which is the third-highest single season total in Oklahoma State history. Ammendola led the conference and ranked fifth in the FBS with 23 field goals. His 23 made field goals, including his 70 made extra point attempts, also ranked as the seventh-best single-season total for an Oklahoma State player. He also made a career-high three field goals at South Alabama. Ammendola also made three field goals against Kansas and Virginia Tech during the Camping World Bowl. He recorded 65 touchbacks on 104 kickoffs and averaging 65.1 yards per kick.

Ammendola ranked fourth in the Big 12, scoring 109 points in his junior year. He made 12 of his first 13 field goals to start his junior year. Ammendola was struggling when he missed five for six field goals, but Ammendola overcame his struggle when he made three field goals to finish the season off. Ammendola served as a game captain against Texas Tech.

Ammendola tied for third in the Big 12 and tied for first among kickers with 108 points scored in his senior year. Ammendola converted 20 of 26 field goals. His longest field goal was a 49-yard field goal against Iowa State. Ammendola made 13 field goals to start the season, and he made his last five field goals to end the season. Ammendola served as a game captain against TCU.

While at Oklahoma State, Matt was a 2017 initiate of the Pi Kappa Alpha fraternity. On March 2, 2024, he received the chapters highest honor being inducted into the Gamma Chi Hall of Fame.

== Professional career ==
Pre-draft measurables
Height	Weight	Arm length	Hand span	Vertical jump	Broad jump	Bench press
5 ft 9 3/4 in (1.77 m)	189 lb (86 kg)	29 7/8 in (0.76 m)	8 3/4 in (0.22 m)	29.5 in (0.75 m)	8 ft 7 in (2.62 m)	10 reps
All values from Pro Day

=== Carolina Panthers ===
On March 24, 2021, Ammendola signed with the Carolina Panthers. He was released on May 16, 2021.

=== New York Jets ===
On July 31, 2021, Ammendola signed with the New York Jets. On December 4, 2021, he was released after going 13-for-19 on field goals through 11 games. Three days later, Ammendola was signed to the practice squad. He signed a reserve/future contract with the Jets on January 10, 2022. Ammendola was released on March 29, 2022.

=== Houston Texans (first stint) ===
On August 25, 2022, Ammendola signed with the Houston Texans. He was waived two days later.

=== Kansas City Chiefs ===
Ammendola was signed to the Kansas City Chiefs practice squad on September 13, 2022. He was then elevated via a standard elevation two days later. He was reverted to the practice squad after the game. Ammendola was elevated to the active roster for the Chiefs' Week 3 game against the Indianapolis Colts due to an injury to starting kicker Harrison Butker. During the game, Ammendola missed a field goal and an extra point. On September 26, 2022, he was released by the team.

=== Arizona Cardinals ===
On October 4, 2022, the Arizona Cardinals signed Ammendola to their practice squad. Four days later, he was activated from the practice squad after an injury to starting kicker Matt Prater. Ammendola started the following day against the Philadelphia Eagles, going 1–2 on field goal attempts, but missed the game-tying field goal at the end of regulation. He was signed to the active roster on October 12. Ammendola was released by the team on October 17.

=== Green Bay Packers ===
On January 3, 2023, Ammendola signed with the Green Bay Packers' practice squad following an injury to Ramiz Ahmed.

The Houston Roughnecks acquired Ammendola's XFL playing rights on August 6, 2023.

=== Houston Texans (second stint) ===
On November 7, 2023, Ammendola was signed to the Texans practice squad following an injury to starting kicker Kaʻimi Fairbairn. Ammendola was promoted to the active roster on November 11. The next day, he kicked the game-winning field goal at the end of regulation against the Cincinnati Bengals. Ammendola was released by the Texans on November 27, 2023, after missing the game-tying 57-yard field goal at the end of regulation the day prior at home against the Jacksonville Jaguars and was re-signed to the practice squad two days later. He was promoted to the active roster on December 2. Ammendola was released on December 12.

=== San Antonio Brahmas ===
On January 19, 2024, Ammendola signed with the San Antonio Brahmas of the United Football League (UFL). He was released on March 10, as the Brahmas chose to sign Donald De La Haye, who won an open competition with Ammendola for the team's kicker position.

=== Toronto Argonauts ===
On February 6, 2026, it was announced that Ammendola had signed with the Toronto Argonauts. He was released on May 9.
