= Edward Morgan Log House =

Historic house in Pennsylvania, United States

- U.S. National Register of Historic Places
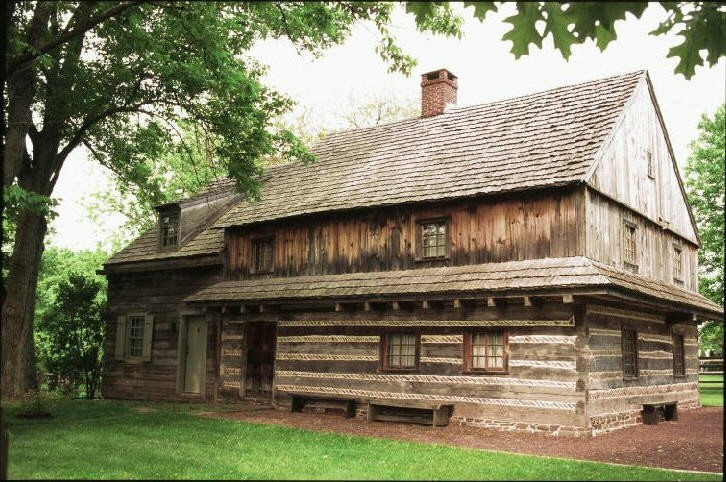
- Morgan Log House, October 2007

- Location within Pennsylvania Location within the United States
- Location: 850 Weikel Rd. near Kulpsville, Towamencin Township, Pennsylvania
- Coordinates: 40°14′42″N 75°18′46″W
- Area: 1.7 acres (0.69 ha)
- Built: 1770
- Architectural style: Medieval European Log House
- NRHP reference No.: 73001646
- Added to NRHP: May 17, 1973

The Edward Morgan Log House is a historic house built c. 1770. It is located at 850 Weikel Rd. in Towamencin Township, Montgomery County, Pennsylvania and was listed on the National Register of Historic Places in 1973.

== History ==
Six-hundred acres, including the house site, was granted by the Commissioners of William Penn to Griffith Jones, a merchant, on February 12, 1702. Edward Morgan bought 309 acres of that land on February 26, 1708. An unspecified "dwelling house" was part of the purchase, though Morgan appears to have been the first settler to live on the property. Morgan came to Pennsylvania in 1698 and settled north of the area's main Welsh settlement in Gwynedd. In 1720 his daughter Sarah married Squire Boone, and ten years later, the couple moved to Berks County, where Daniel Boone was born in 1734. Other descendants of Edward Morgan include Daniel Morgan, Lowell Thomas, and Walter L. Morgan.

In 1723, Edward Morgan deeded 104 acres, including the house, to his son John Morgan, who sold the property to Evan David in 1741. John Yeakel, a Schwenkfelder, bought the property in 1770 and then sold 82 acres to Yellis Cassel, a Mennonite, in 1774. The property stayed in the Cassel family for 99 years until Frederick Bower bought the house along with 62 acres. After several other owners, William Nash bought the house and 17 acres in 1965, and planned to develop and subdivide the land. The house was condemned in 1967, but was recognized as a historic structure the same year and an organization was formed to save it from demolition. Towamencin Township bought the house along with 1.7 acres in 1970.

The Welsh Valley Preservation Society now operates tours of the Morgan Log House.

== Architecture ==
The house has two-and-a-half stories, with a center chimney. It was constructed of white oak logs with notched corners and chinked with diagonally placed stones. A pent roof runs around three sides of the house, and the gable ends were covered in vertical sheathing. The original interior is well preserved, including original hand wrought hardware and a large central fireplace.

By 1976, the floor plan was restored to three rooms on the first floor, with a spring room in the partial basement, three rooms on the second floor, and an undivided attic.
