= North Wales, Pennsylvania =

Borough in Pennsylvania, US

Borough of North Wales
- Borough
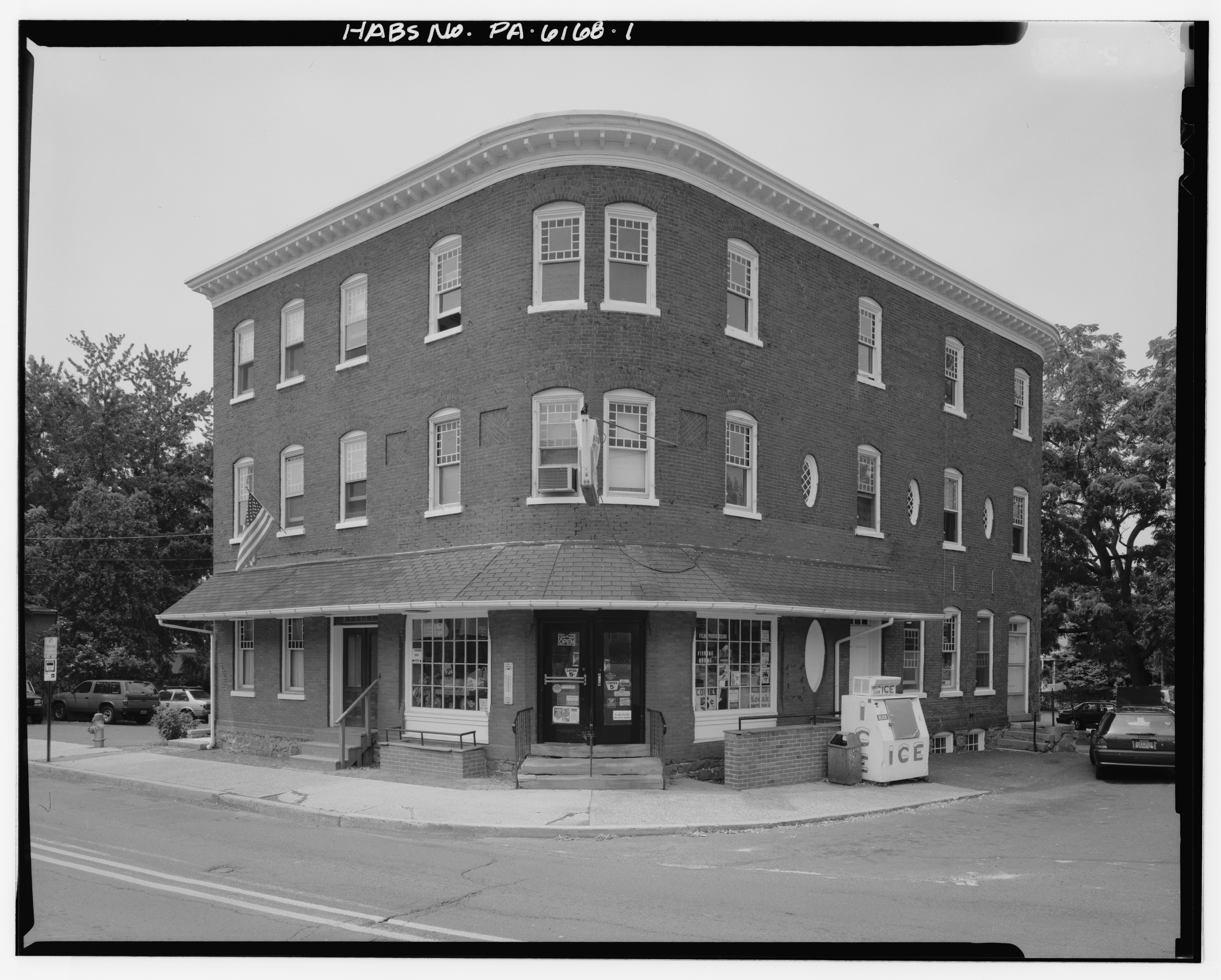
- The former Weingartner Cigar Factory on Walnut Street

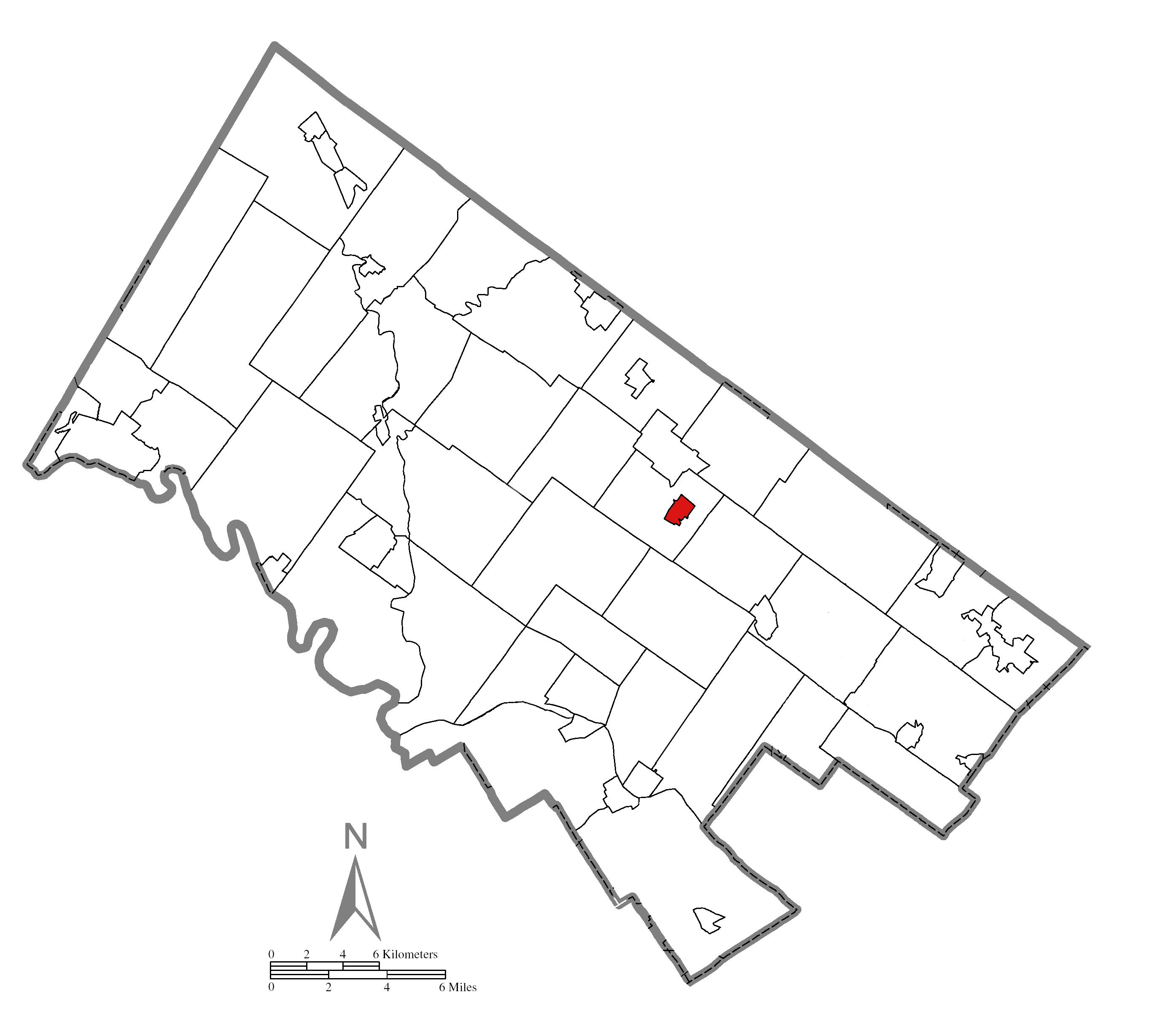
- Location of North Wales in Montgomery County, Pennsylvania

- Location of North Wales in Pennsylvania North Wales (the United States)
- Coordinates: 40°12′39″N 75°16′30″W
- Country: United States
- State: Pennsylvania
- County: Montgomery
- Incorporated: 1869

Government
  - Type: Council-manager
  - Mayor: Neil McDevitt

Area
  - Total: 0.59 sq mi (1.52 km^{2})
  - Land: 0.59 sq mi (1.52 km^{2})
  - Water: 0 sq mi (0.00 km^{2})
- Elevation: 400 ft (120 m)

Population (2020)
  - Total: 3,426
  - Density: 5,835/sq mi (2,252.8/km^{2})
- Time zone: UTC-5 (EST)
  - Summer (DST): UTC-4 (EDT)
- ZIP Codes: 19436, 19454, 19455, 19477
- Area codes: 215, 267, and 445
- FIPS code: 42-55512
- Website: northwalesborough.org

North Wales is a borough in Montgomery County, Pennsylvania. It is a suburb of Philadelphia and is one of the three historic population centers that make up the North Penn Valley, which is centered on the borough of Lansdale. It is approximately 27 miles (43 km) north of Center City Philadelphia. The population was 3,426 as of the 2020 census.

Like many small boroughs in Pennsylvania, North Wales' boundaries have not kept pace with population growth. In similar fashion, many businesses and residences with North Wales addresses are located in outlying townships that were never annexed by the borough, such as the Montgomery Mall in Montgomery Township. North Wales is in the North Penn School District.

== History ==
=== 18th century ===
As its name suggests, North Wales was settled by Welsh immigrants who named it after North Wales. Part of a 1702 land grant by William Penn, the area was then a rich farming country named Gwynedd for the homeland of the earliest settlers. It began as a pastoral village in agricultural Gwynedd Township.

=== 19th century ===
Before 1850, a number of farms, and a 1776 church, shared by the Lutheran and Episcopal congregations, dotted the present borough's landscape. What is now Main Street was originally an old Indian trail, and was laid out as the Great Road in 1728. By 1828, it had become today's Sumneytown Pike, and was a toll road until 1914. It had always been an important route to Philadelphia, and continues to serve as a connection to Routes 202 and 309 to the east and the Northeastern Extension of the Pennsylvania Turnpike to the west.

Its rural character was abruptly disrupted by the building of the North Pennsylvania Railroad starting in 1852. Service from Bethlehem to Philadelphia through North Wales began in 1857.

The town quickly grew around the railroad station, with hotels and restaurants lining Walnut Street and Main Street within walking distance. North Wales is the oldest of the North Penn boroughs, incorporated in 1869, by taking land from today's Upper Gwynedd Township, then the northern portion of Gwynedd Township. Some of the large homes at the start of the 20th century were opened to summer guests from the city.

"Idlewilde", still present on Main Street, hosted Pedro II of Brazil, the last monarch of Brazil, during his visit to Philadelphia to open the Centennial Exhibition in Philadelphia in 1875 with President Ulysses S. Grant.

During the late 19th and early 20th centuries, much of North Wales borough's housing was built. Most houses along South Main Street between Montgomery and Prospects Streets remain much as they were when built and are lovingly maintained. The borough also features a variety of single family homes, as well as twins, and rowhouses.

=== 20th century ===
Between 1900 and 1926, Lehigh Valley Transit Company operated its Chestnut Hill Branch trolley line, which connected North Wales to surrounding towns through service to either Philadelphia or Allentown.

The trolley ran down Main Street through the borough, but detoured onto Pennsylvania Avenue for two blocks to enable it to cross the North Penn Railroad on a bridge.

The bridge was required because the railroad, citing safety concerns, refused to allow the trolleys to cross at the Main Street grade crossing. Lehigh Valley Transit Company's combined passenger and freight station was located on the northeast side of Pennsylvania Avenue between Shearer Street and Montgomery Avenue. After Main Street trolley service ended in 1926, Lehigh Valley Transit high-speed trolleys continued to serve the Wales Junction station, located on Sumneytown Pike three-quarters of a mile west of town. High-speed trolley serviced ended in September 1951.

=== 21st century ===
In 2000, the North Wales Historic Preservation District was established by Borough Council and the Pennsylvania Historic and Museum Commission to protect the architecture that is a visual reminder of the borough's past. It is the first Historic District in the North Penn boroughs.

== Business district ==
North Wales' Main and Walnut Streets have been home to many businesses over the town's history; they still provide services such as hair salons and beauty parlors, doctors' offices, a dry cleaner, a running and walking shoe specialty store, a yoga studio, two auto repair facilities and auto body shops, two laundromats, a post office, convenience store, and a recording studio. Eateries and bars include two pizza parlors, a Tex-Mex restaurant, two cafés, a bakery, a protein-shake café and a vegan restaurant.

== Education ==
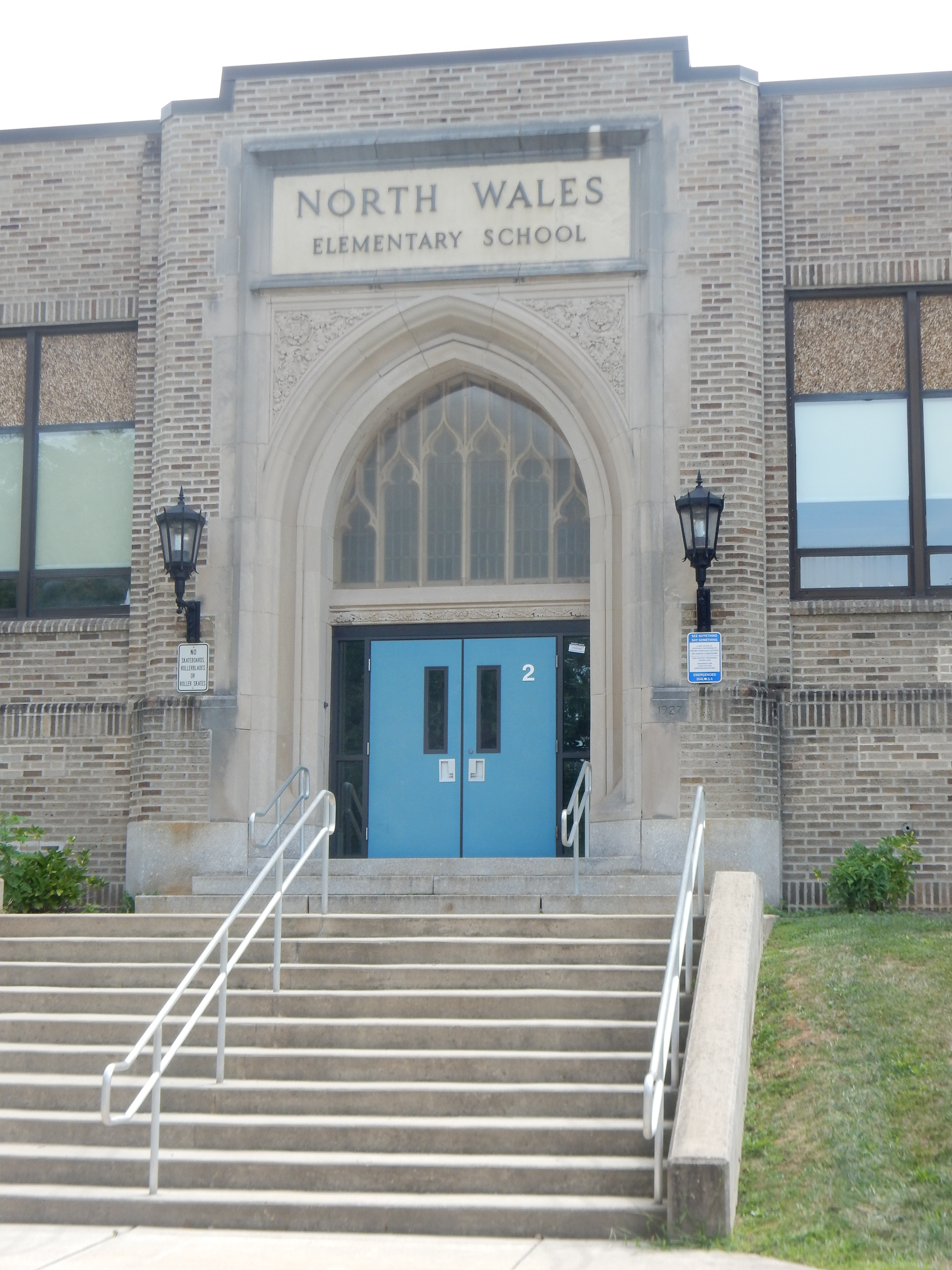
North Wales Elementary School

North Wales Elementary School is part of the North Penn School District. The building was North Wales High School from 1927 until North Penn High School was built in the 1950s; it then became an elementary school. The original elementary school from the 1900s was located at the current site of Borough Hall.

Mater Dei Catholic School in Lansdale, of the Roman Catholic Archdiocese of Philadelphia. In January 2012, the archdiocese announced that St. Rose of Lima would merge with St. Stanislaus Parish School in Lansdale, with students attending classes in Lansdale.

=== Library ===
North Wales Elementary School formerly housed the North Wales Memorial Free Library from 1927 to 2009. Due to the growing number of students at school, as well as the library's need for more space, the library purchased and relocated to a much larger (10,000 ft^{2}, over 900 m^{2}) building at 233 South Swartley Street. They began operating with limited hours at the new location on January 4, 2010, and had their grand opening in April 2010 with full hours, including Saturday. The library has also changed its name to "North Wales Area Library" upon its move. It is part of the Montgomery County Library System.

== Parks and recreation ==
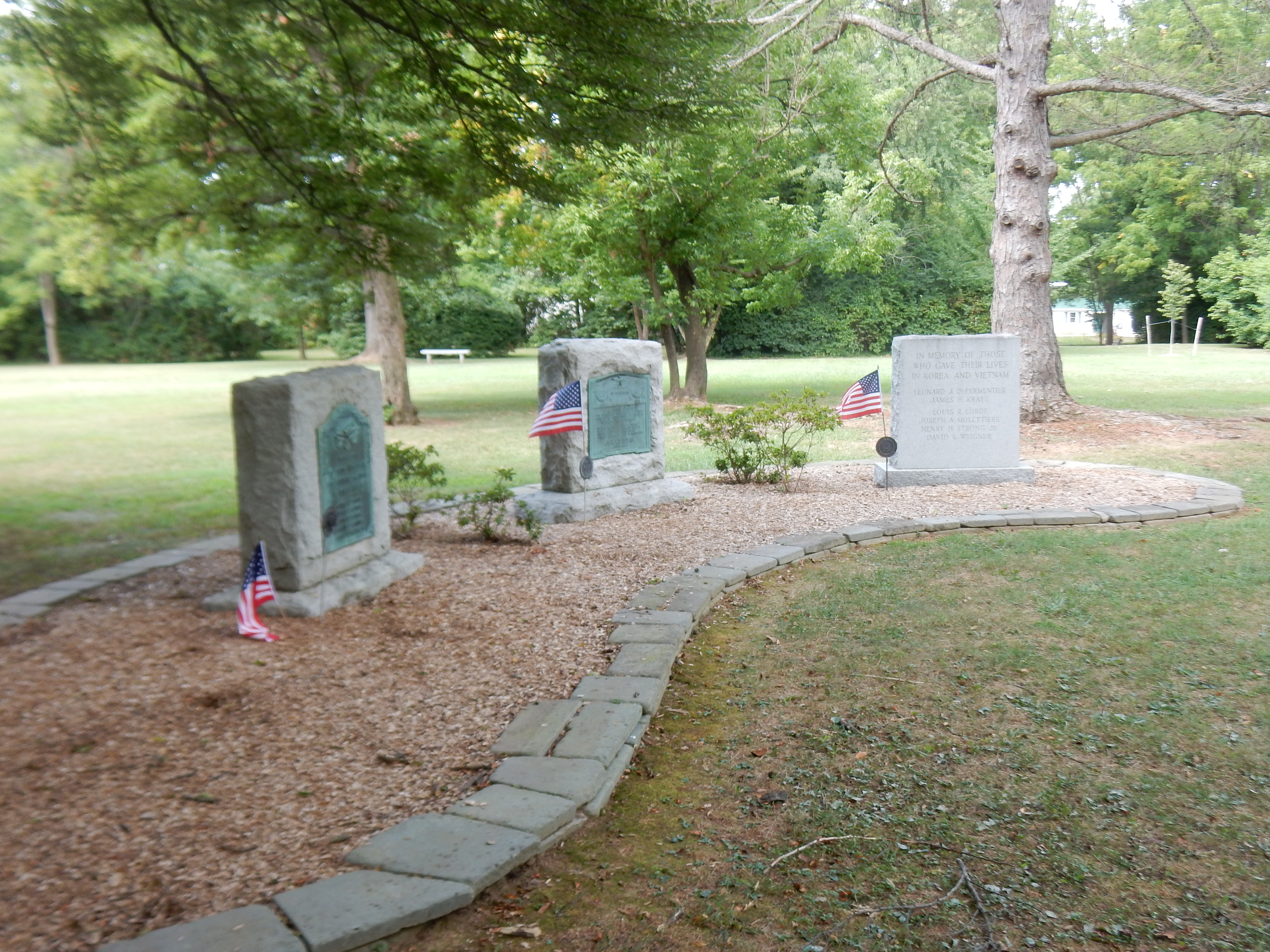
Weingartner Memorial Park

Weingartner Park is located at Second and Summit Streets. It has paths, benches and shady trees. The Wee Wailers park, a children's playground, is on Shearer St.

Second Street Park, at Second Street and Prospect Avenue, is a public tennis court area.

The Fourth Street Park is an open area, about 11,000-square-foot (1,000 m^{2}), used for various sporting activities. The clay totem poles were made by residents.

Eighth Street Park, also known as "A Child's Garden," was developed by local children. It has a brick walking path, plantings and benches.

Ninth Street Park, at Ninth and Church Streets, is a watershed runoff area designed to attract birds. There is a trail with footbridge over the drainage area; it is a natural-feeling area.

== Demographics ==
Historical population
Census	Pop.	Note	%±
1870	407		—
1880	673		65.4%
1890	1,060		57.5%
1900	1,287		21.4%
1910	1,710		32.9%
1920	2,041		19.4%
1930	2,393		17.2%
1940	2,450		2.4%
1950	2,998		22.4%
1960	3,673		22.5%
1970	3,911		6.5%
1980	3,391		−13.3%
1990	3,802		12.1%
2000	3,342		−12.1%
2010	3,229		−3.4%
2020	3,426		6.1%

=== 2020 census ===
As of the 2020 census, North Wales had a population of 3,426. The median age was 41.5 years. 19.0% of residents were under the age of 18 and 16.3% of residents were 65 years of age or older. For every 100 females there were 97.8 males, and for every 100 females age 18 and over there were 98.7 males age 18 and over.

100.0% of residents lived in urban areas, while 0.0% lived in rural areas.

There were 1,312 households in North Wales, of which 30.3% had children under the age of 18 living in them. Of all households, 48.7% were married-couple households, 19.7% were households with a male householder and no spouse or partner present, and 24.8% were households with a female householder and no spouse or partner present. About 27.7% of all households were made up of individuals and 9.7% had someone living alone who was 65 years of age or older.

There were 1,370 housing units, of which 4.2% were vacant. The homeowner vacancy rate was 1.4% and the rental vacancy rate was 5.9%.

Racial composition as of the 2020 census
Race	Number	Percent
White	2,873	83.9%
Black or African American	166	4.8%
American Indian and Alaska Native	8	0.2%
Asian	111	3.2%
Native Hawaiian and Other Pacific Islander	1	0.0%
Some other race	68	2.0%
Two or more races	199	5.8%
Hispanic or Latino (of any race)	140	4.1%

=== Demographic estimates ===
As of a 2017 census estimate, there were 869 families residing in the borough.

The population density was 5,848.7 inhabitants per square mile (2,258.2/km^{2}). There were 1,330 housing units at an average density of 2,327.6 per square mile (898.7/km^{2}).

33.1% of households were non-families. The average household size was 2.56 and the average family size was 3.18.

7.4% of the population was from 18 to 24, 33.7% from 25 to 44, and 21.7% from 45 to 64.

=== Income and poverty ===
The median income for a household in the borough was $54,605, and the median income for a family was $63,235. Males had a median income of $41,265 versus $33,045 for females. The per capita income for the borough was $26,590. About 3.2% of families and 4.7% of the population were below the poverty line, including 8.0% of those under age 18 and 4.0% of those age 65 or over.

== Government ==
North Wales has a borough form of government with a mayor and a nine-member borough council. The mayor is Neil McDevitt and the President of Council is Sal Amato. Neil McDevitt was the first deaf person to be elected mayor of a municipality in the United States.

The borough is part of the Fourth Congressional District (represented by Rep. Madeleine Dean), the 61st State House District (represented by State Representative Liz Hanbidge) and the 24th State Senate District (represented by State Senator Tracy Pennycuick).

Presidential election results
Year	Republican	Democratic
2020	35.7% 737	62.8% 1,297
2016	35.6% 638	58.4% 1,046
2012	35.5% 598	62.4% 1,050
2008	35.4% 638	63.3% 1,143
2004	42.1% 758	57.2% 1,030
2000	42.1% 596	54.2% 767

== Police ==
The North Wales Police Department has four full-time and four part-time officers. The department was headed by Kenneth Veit, who was the Chief of Police from 1973 to 2003. Chief Barry J. Hackert served from 2003 - 2013, at which point Hackert was suspended for involvement in an off-duty assault in the Poconos. Hackert subsequently resigned. Alex Levy was hired as the new chief in 2013. In 2022, North Wales Borough hired David Erenius as its new Chief of Police.

== Infrastructure ==
=== Transportation ===
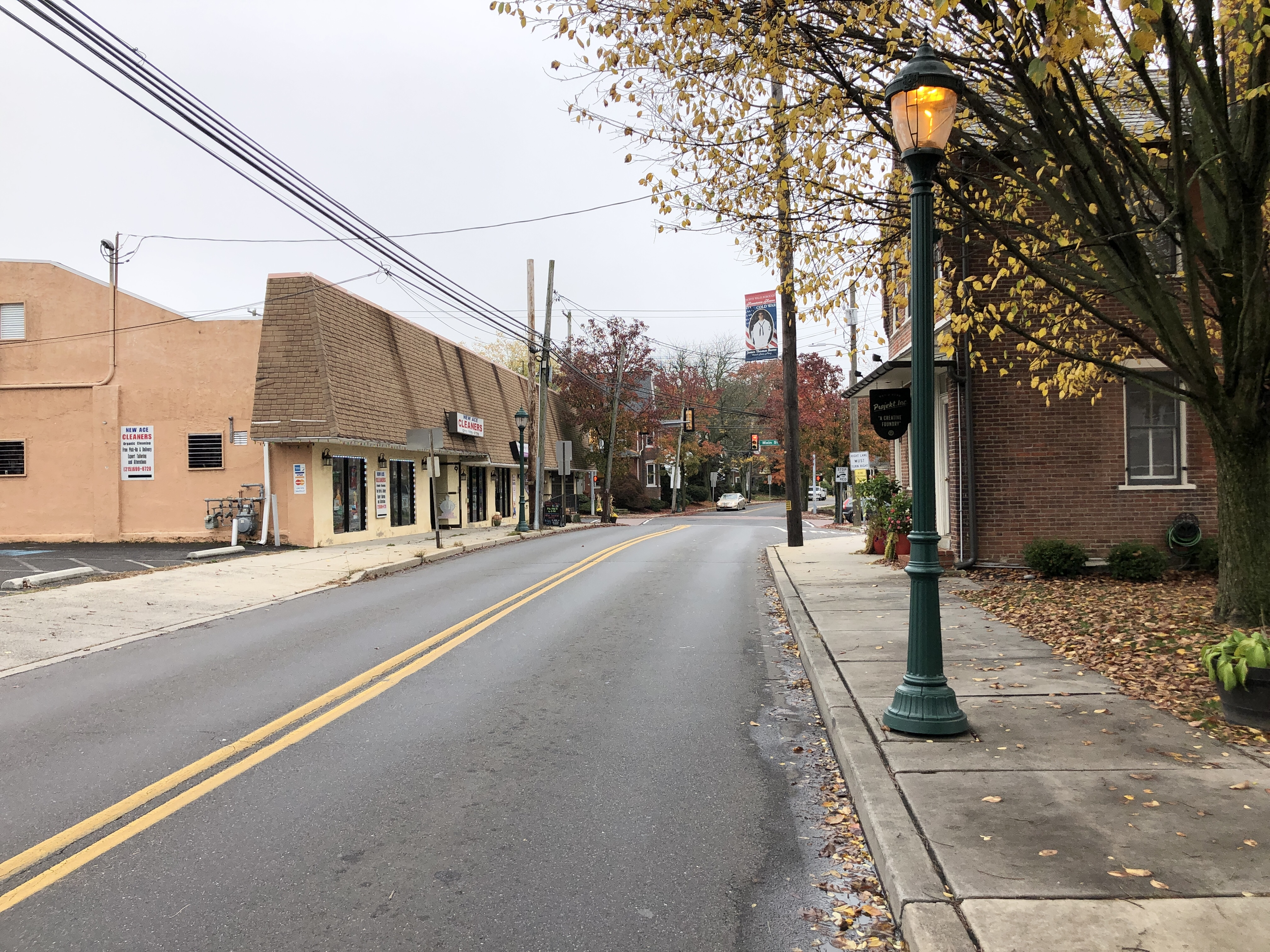
Walnut Street in North Wales

As of 2022 there were 12.36 miles (19.89 km) of public roads in North Wales, of which 1.03 miles (1.66 km) were maintained by the Pennsylvania Department of Transportation (PennDOT) and 11.33 miles (18.23 km) were maintained by the borough.

Main Street runs northwest-southeast through North Wales, becoming Sumneytown Pike outside the borough, while Walnut Street runs southwest-northeast through North Wales, becoming North Wales Road outside the borough. No state highways pass through North Wales. U.S. Route 202 passes to the east of North Wales and Pennsylvania Route 63 passes to the northeast of North Wales. Pennsylvania Route 309 passes through Montgomeryville, which is east of the borough, and Pennsylvania Route 363 bypasses North Wales to the north along the Upper Gwynedd-Towamencin township line. The Pennsylvania Turnpike Northeast Extension (Interstate 476) is located west of North Wales, with connections to the borough via Sumneytown Pike to Exit 31 in the north, as well as North Wales Road to Germantown Pike at Exit 20 to the south.

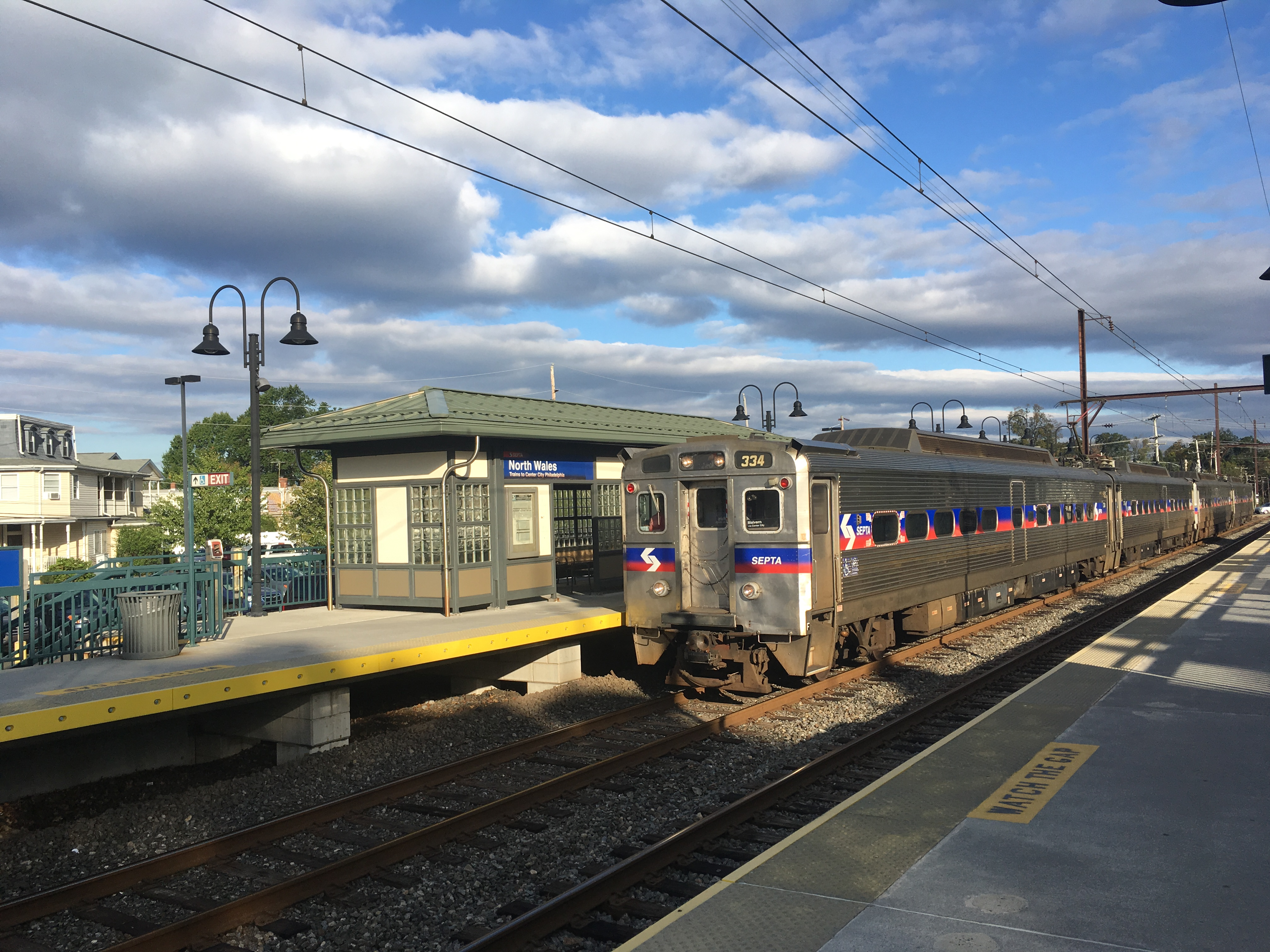
A SEPTA Regional Rail train on the Lansdale/Doylestown Line stops at the North Wales station

Public transportation in North Wales is provided by SEPTA. Many North Wales residents commute to Center City Philadelphia by SEPTA Regional Rail's Lansdale/Doylestown Line train, which stops at the North Wales station. The 1870s-vintage brick railroad station, thoroughly restored in 2010, is open weekday mornings. SEPTA Suburban Bus Route 96 serves North Wales, providing service to the Norristown Transportation Center in Norristown and Lansdale.

=== Utilities ===
Electricity and natural gas in North Wales is provided by PECO Energy Company, a subsidiary of Exelon. The North Wales Water Authority provides water and sewer service to North Wales and surrounding townships. Cable, telephone, and internet service in North Wales s provided by Xfinity and Verizon. Trash and recycling collection in North Wales is provided by private haulers including Advanced Disposal, Republic Services, Waste Management, and Whitetail Disposal.

== Notable people ==
- Captain Janks, prolific television prank caller
- Sharon Little, singer-songwriter
- Joe McKeehen, professional poker player and World Series of Poker champion in 2015
- John Oates, rock musician, Hall & Oates
- William B. T. Trego, historical painter
