= Brandon McManus =

American football player (born 1991)

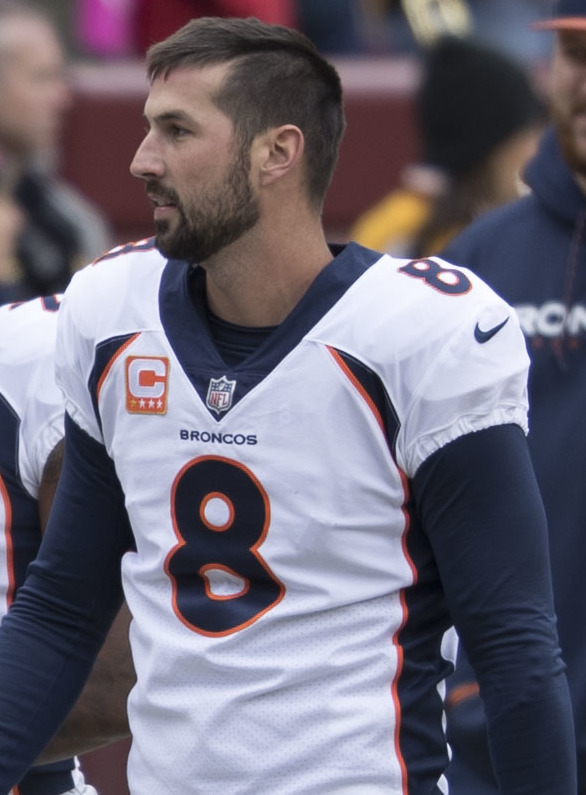
- McManus with the Denver Broncos in 2017

No. 19 – Los Angeles Rams
- Position: Kicker
- Roster status: Active

Personal information
- Born: July 25, 1991 (age 35); Philadelphia, Pennsylvania, U.S.
- Listed height: 6 ft 3 in (1.91 m)
- Listed weight: 201 lb (91 kg)

Career information
- High school: North Penn (Towamencin Township, PA)
- College: Temple (2009–2012)
- NFL draft: 2013: undrafted

Career history
- Indianapolis Colts (2013)*; New York Giants (2014)*; Denver Broncos (2014–2022); Jacksonville Jaguars (2023); Washington Commanders (2024)*; Green Bay Packers (2024–2025); Los Angeles Rams (2026–present)
- * Offseason or practice squad member only

Awards and highlights
- Super Bowl champion (50); First-team All-Big East (2012); Second-team All-MAC (2011)

Career NFL statistics as of Week 10, 2026
- Field goals made: 302
- Field goals attempted: 367
- Field goal %: 82.3%
- Longest field goal: 61
- Extra points made: 388
- Extra points attempted: 398
- Extra point %: 97.5%
- Points: 1,294
- Stats at Pro Football Reference

Brandon Tyler McManus (born July 25, 1991) is an American professional football kicker for the Los Angeles Rams of the National Football League (NFL). He played college football for the Temple Owls and was signed by the Indianapolis Colts as an undrafted free agent in 2013. McManus has also been a member of the New York Giants, Jacksonville Jaguars, Washington Commanders, and Green Bay Packers. He was a member of the Broncos team that won Super Bowl 50.

== College career ==
McManus holds the Temple career records for points scored (338), field goals made (60), field goals attempted (83), and punting average (45.3). As a senior in 2012, he earned All-Big East first-team honors after leading the team in scoring (74) on 14-of-17 field goals and 32-of-33 extra points. He averaged 45.1 yards per punt, pinned 17 punts inside the 20-yard line and had a long kick of 68 yards. McManus handled kickoff duties as well and recorded 40 touchbacks on 56 total kickoffs.

== Professional career ==
Pre-draft measurables
Height	Weight	Arm length	Hand span	Wingspan	40-yard dash	10-yard split	20-yard split	20-yard shuttle	Three-cone drill	Vertical jump	Bench press
6 ft 3 1/2 in (1.92 m)	201 lb (91 kg)	31 1/8 in (0.79 m)	9 1/2 in (0.24 m)	6 ft 4 in (1.93 m)	4.80 s	1.65 s	2.73 s	4.63 s	6.82 s	27.5 in (0.70 m)	8 reps
All values from Pro Day

=== Indianapolis Colts ===
After going undrafted in the 2013 NFL draft, McManus signed with the Indianapolis Colts on April 28, 2013. On August 25, McManus was waived.

=== New York Giants ===
On January 2, 2014, McManus signed a reserve/futures contract with the New York Giants. He played in four preseason games for the team.

=== Denver Broncos ===
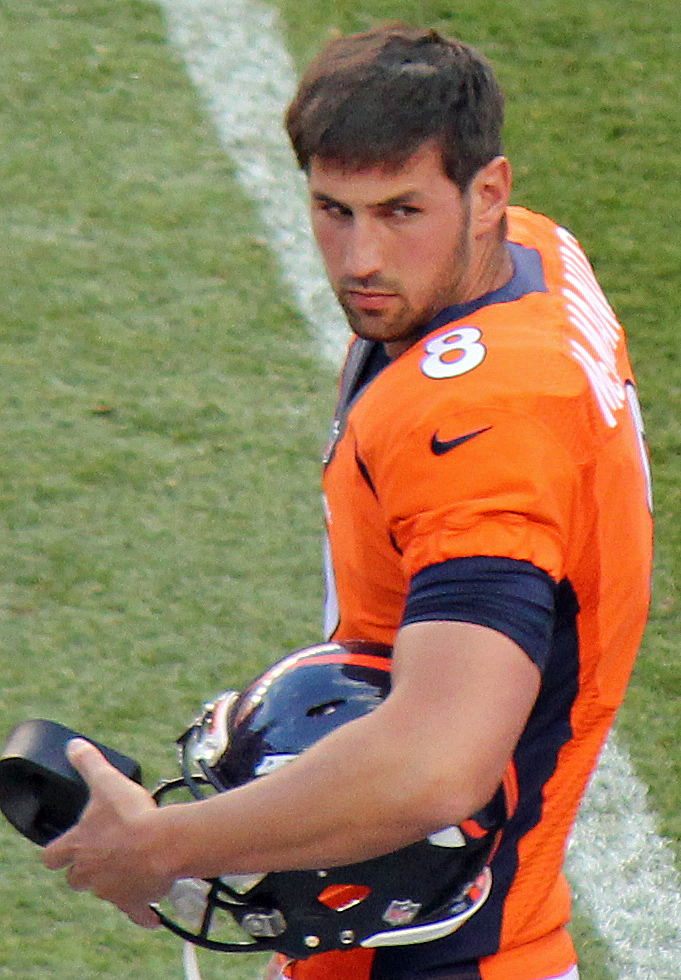
McManus in 2014

On August 26, 2014, the Giants traded McManus to the Denver Broncos to cover for the loss of the Broncos' starting kicker Matt Prater, who began the 2014 NFL season serving a four-game suspension.

McManus became their starting kicker following the release of Prater on October 3, 2014. McManus was waived by the Broncos on November 11 after the team decided to sign free agent Connor Barth as his replacement. McManus cleared waivers, and was quickly re-signed by the Broncos, spending the rest of the season as the team's kickoff specialist. In 11 games with the Broncos as the primary placekicker, McManus converted all 41 extra point attempts, as well as nine of 13 field goal attempts.

Going into the 2015 season, the Broncos brought both Barth and McManus to training camp. McManus won the job, proving more consistent than he had been in 2014, and the Broncos cut Barth. On September 13, 2015, he became the third kicker in NFL history to make multiple field goals of 56 or more yards in the same game, joining Sebastian Janikowski and Greg Zuerlein, who both achieved the feat in the 2012 season. On October 18, McManus made the game winning overtime field goal to propel the Broncos to a 26–23 overtime victory over the Cleveland Browns. He was named AFC Special Teams Player of the Month for October. McManus finished the 2015 season converting 35 of 36 extra point attempts and 30 of 35 field goal attempts. In the Divisional Round of the playoffs, McManus tied an NFL-postseason record by making five field goals in a 23–16 victory over the Pittsburgh Steelers at Sports Authority Field at Mile High. After defeating the New England Patriots in the AFC Championship, McManus and the Broncos advanced to the Super Bowl. In Super Bowl 50, he played a crucial role by making three field goals on three attempts and an extra point in the 24–10 victory over the Carolina Panthers. His 10 post-season field goals that year was also a Broncos franchise record.

In the 2016 season, McManus converted 32 of 33 extra point attempts and 29 of 34 field goal attempts.

On March 7, 2017, the Broncos placed a second round restricted free agent tender on McManus. On September 11, McManus signed a three-year contract extension with the Broncos. In the 2017 season, McManus converted all 27 extra point attempts and 24 of 32 field goal attempts.

In the 2018 season, McManus converted all 35 extra point attempts and 20 of 25 field goal attempts.

In the 2019 season, McManus converted 25 of 26 extra point attempts and 29 of 34 field goal attempts.

On September 11, 2020, McManus signed a four-year, $17.2 million contract extension with the Broncos through the 2024 season. During Week 4 against the New York Jets, McManus hit a 53-yard field goal that stood as the game-winner in the 37–28 victory, earning AFC Special Teams Player of the Week. Two weeks later against the Patriots, McManus scored all 18 of his team's points, converting six field goals in the 18–12 victory. McManus was named the AFC Special Teams of the Week for his performance in Week 6. He was placed on the reserve/COVID-19 list by the team on December 14, and was re-activated nine days later. In the 2020 season, McManus converted 24 of 27 extra point attempts and 28 of 34 field goal attempts.

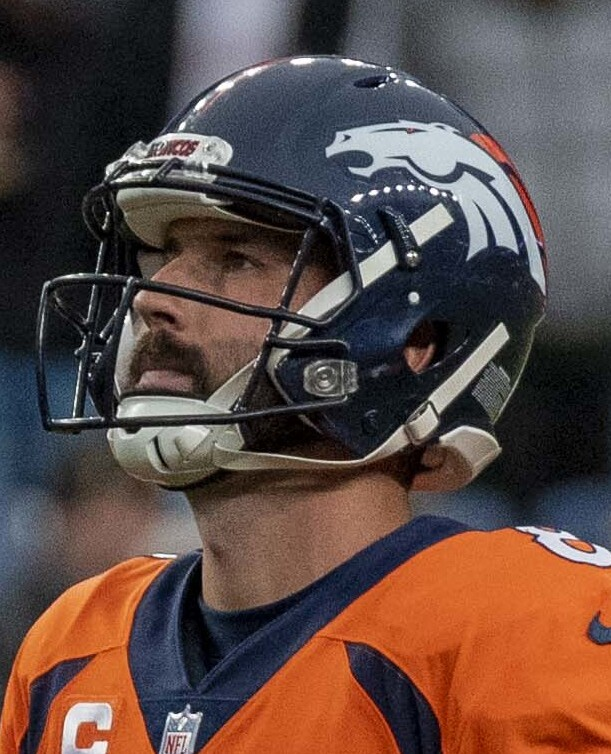
McManus in 2021

In Week 14 of the 2021 season, McManus converted all five extra points and a 52-yard field goal in a 38–10 victory over the Detroit Lions, earning AFC Special Teams Player of the Week. Three weeks later, McManus kicked a career-long 61-yard field goal against the Los Angeles Chargers at the end of the first half. In the 2021 season, McManus converted 33 of 34 extra point attempts and 26 of 31 field goal attempts.

In the 2022 season, McManus converted 25 of 27 extra point attempts and 28 of 36 field goal attempts.

On May 23, 2023, McManus was released by the Broncos and designated as a post-June 1 cut. At the time of his release, McManus was the last remaining member of the Super Bowl 50 winning team still with the team.

=== Jacksonville Jaguars ===
McManus signed a one-year deal with the Jacksonville Jaguars on May 25, 2023. He was named AFC Special Teams Player of the Week in Week 4 after kicking 3-for-3 in a victory. McManus was also named AFC Special Teams Player of the Month for October after kicking 12-for-12 during the month.

=== Washington Commanders ===
On March 14, 2024, McManus signed a one-year deal with the Washington Commanders. He was released on June 2, after sexual assault allegations stemming from his time with the Jaguars went public.

=== Green Bay Packers ===
On October 16, 2024, McManus was signed by the Green Bay Packers. Four days later, in his first game with the Packers, he kicked a 45 yard game-winning field goal to help Green Bay narrowly defeat the Houston Texans 24–22. McManus kicked a 24 yard game-winning field goal to help Green Bay defeat his former team, the Jacksonville Jaguars, 30–27, in his second game with the Packers the following week. In 11 games with the Packers, McManus converted all 30 extra point attempts and 20-of-21 field goal attempts in the 2024 season.

On March 4, 2025, McManus agreed to a three-year, $15.3 million contract with the Packers, including a $5 million signing bonus. In the 2025 season, he converted 32 of 33 extra point attempts and 24 of 30 field goal attempts.

During the Packers' Wild Card playoff game against the Chicago Bears, McManus missed a field goal in the second quarter, an extra point attempt in the fourth quarter, and a field goal with less than 3 minutes remaining in the fourth quarter which would have given his team a late 6 point lead; the Packers would go on to lose the game 31–27.

On May 8, 2026, McManus was released by the Packers.

=== Los Angeles Rams ===
On October 20, 2026, McManus was signed by the Los Angeles Rams.

== NFL career statistics ==
Legend
	Won the Super Bowl
**Bold**	Career high

=== Regular season ===
General			Field goals					PATs			Kickoffs			Points
Season	Team	GP	FGM	FGA	FG%	Blck	Long	XPM	XPA	XP%	KO	Avg	TBs	Pts
2014	DEN	15	9	13	69.2	0	44	**41**	**41**	100.0	**91**	**65.7**	64	68
2015	DEN	16	**30**	35	85.7	0	57	35	36	97.2	81	62.3	55	**125**
2016	DEN	16	29	34	85.3	0	55	32	33	97.0	79	61.6	51	119
2017	DEN	16	24	32	75.0	**2**	53	27	27	100.0	71	59.0	45	99
2018	DEN	16	20	25	80.0	0	53	35	35	100.0	73	61.3	42	95
2019	DEN	16	29	34	85.3	0	53	25	26	96.2	72	64.4	55	112
2020	DEN	15	28	34	82.4	**2**	58	24	27	88.9	73	61.9	54	108
2021	DEN	17	26	31	83.9	1	**61**	33	34	97.1	78	63.8	62	111
2022	DEN	17	28	36	77.8	**2**	55	25	27	92.6	73	62.7	51	109
2023	JAX	17	**30**	**37**	81.1	1	56	35	35	100.0	86	63.0	**65**	**125**
2024	GB	11	20	21	**95.2**	0	55	30	30	100.0	61	64.0	27	90
2025	GB	14	24	30	80.0	1	56	32	33	97.0	69	65.0	15	104
2026	LAR	4	5	5	100.0	0	43	14	14	100.0	6	63.3	4	29
Total		190	302	367	82.3	9	61	388	398	97.5	913	63.0	590	1,294
Source: pro-football-reference.com

=== Postseason ===
General			Field goals					PATs			Kickoffs			Points
Season	Team	GP	FGM	FGA	FG%	Blck	Long	XPM	XPA	XP%	KO	Avg	TBs	Pts
2014	DEN	1	0	0	0.0	0	0	0	0	0.0	4	59.0	2	0
2015	DEN	3	**10**	**10**	100.0	0	**52**	**3**	**3**	100.0	**17**	**82.4**	**14**	**33**
2024	GB	1	1	2	50.0	0	26	1	1	100.0	3	65.0	1	4
2025	GB	1	0	2	0.0	0	0	3	4	75.0	5	62.0	1	3
Total		6	11	14	78.6	0	52	7	8	87.5	29	64.0	18	40
Source: pro-football-reference.com

== Sexual assault lawsuit ==
On May 24, 2024, two flight attendants sued McManus, alleging that he had sexually assaulted them during a team chartered flight from Jacksonville to London in 2023, as the Jaguars were traveling to play consecutive games in London. McManus denied the allegations. The lawsuit also alleged that the Jaguars committed gross negligence by failing to properly train McManus about inappropriate and sexual contact with flight staff, supervise him on the flight, adopt policies and procedures to protect flight staff from sexual misconduct by employees, or enforce a zero-tolerance policy regarding inappropriate behavior.

In September 2024, the NFL concluded its investigation into the incident, saying there was insufficient evidence to support a finding that McManus had violated the league's personal conduct policy. That same month, a judge dismissed the women's initial lawsuit, saying their case did not rise to the "exceptional" criteria required for anonymity. The women then filed an amended complaint, this time using their names. In October 2024, upon being signed by Green Bay, attorneys for both McManus and the accusers stated that the case was "resolved" without providing additional information.
