= Captain Janks =

American practical joker (born 1966)

- Born: Thomas Michael Cipriano; March 28, 1966 (age 60)
- Occupations: Prank caller; war veteran; toilet seats and plastics manufacturer; medical laboratory shipping clerk; truck driver; gas station worker
- Years active: 1989–present

Thomas Michael Cipriano (born March 28, 1966), also known as Captain Janks, is an American practical joker most notable for making prank calls to live television shows and news networks since the late 1980s, such as Larry King Live, CNN and ABC News. He has been labeled by The Washington Post as the "nemesis of news outlets," "the news media's greatest crank caller," and by the Philadelphia City Paper as "public enemy No. 1 for television- and radio-show screeners." Janks and The Washington Post have described the calls as commentary on the lack of source verification done in news outlets. All of Janks' calls reference Howard Stern and his radio series, and the Captain Janks alter ego has become a recurring character on the show.

== Prank calling ==
=== History ===
"How many times must they fall for the same prank? They never learn, and when they screw up and put a prank caller on the air, they cry 'foul.' How about if the viewers start asking, 'How could CNN let that happen as much as it does? Don't they check their sources?' My pranks are never about the story itself, just the organization that is covering the story."

— Cipriano on his pranks

Cipriano was inspired to do prank calls from hearing tapes of the Tube Bar prank calls. Cipriano began his prank calling career in 1989, when he telephoned local Philadelphia television shows and sent tapes of his calls to The Howard Stern Show. Howard Stern is the person referenced in all of Cipriano's last comments in each of the prank calls, and the Captain Janks alter ego has become a recurring character on Stern's show.

Cipriano's national live television airing prank call career began with talk shows; his first call was in 1989, when he telephoned to Larry King's talk show Larry King Live. He then made prank calls to other interview television shows such as those of Phil Donahue and CNN's Sonya Freedman in the early 1990s. In 1992, his prank calling expanded to live news series; he faked as a witness of an earthquake that took place in Landers, California, when calling to CNN.

Cipriano also telephoned shows that wouldn't take calls while on air. The first time he did this was in 1991; he lied to producers of the Jerry Lewis Labor Day Telethon that he was a representative for King in order to make a call on the show, saying that King wanted to make a "pledge" to Lewis. Cipriano then compiled samples of King's voice and ordered them in a way that would trick the producers into believing it was really King talking on the phone. When Cipriano called with his real voice asking Lewis about Howard Stern when the show aired, Lewis called him a "schmuck."

On June 25, 1996, a collection album of recordings of Janks' phone-call pranks, titled King of the Cranks, was released on compact disc and cassette tape via the labels Atlantic Records and Ozone Music.

In October 1999, John Katsilometes reported that Cipriano had crank phoned "just about every emergency [live] report worthy of national coverage," such as those regarding the Columbine High School shootings and the car crash death of Princess Diana. Television stations Cipriano has successfully prank-called range from national and local news networks like NBC News, Fox News, C-SPAN, ESPN to home-shopping channels and religious networks. In 2014, Cipriano suggested he has made around 10,000 fake phone calls.

The popularity of The Howard Stern Show has also led to numerous imitators of Captain Janks. A 1996 Philadelphia magazine article reported that there was "at least one Janks imitator in every major city." One of these imitators called The Today Show in the summer of 1992 asking Ross Perot if he had "mind-melded with Howard Stern's penis." According to the article, "Reaching them by phone or through the Howard Stern Newsletter—written and disseminated by Kevin Renzulli of West Orange, New Jersey, another of Stern's true believers—Janks coordinates group operations, such as Larry King being hit by three consecutive callers shouting "Howard Stern" and "Baba Booey"—Stern's nickname for producer Gary Dell'Abate—while interviewing Donny Osmond."

=== Method ===
Cipriano has reasoned in an interview that, in addition to making people laugh, he does prank calls of live television shows and news stations to make fun of the lack of fact-checking that he felt was a problem in news organizations, especially CNN. He explained, "They are so willing to get the "scoop" before anyone else that they can be very sloppy about getting the story on the air." The Washington Post journalist Paul Farhi has also marked the crank calls a critique of the lack of accuracy review in news stations: "That Cipriano, a self-described "not-too-bright guy," can beat professional call screeners so often suggests they don't do it often enough in the race for color, drama and "breaking news."

In a 1996 interview, Cipriano explained he had a 16-setting voice changer for use in tricking producers into letting him call onto their shows.

=== List of examples ===
- In 1991, Cipriano called into The Elvis Files, a live TV special hosted by Bill Bixby purporting to have evidence that Elvis Presley was still alive. Cipriano asked Bixby why he didn't call into Howard Stern's show "like (he) promised" and added "That's very naughty." In 1992's follow-up special, The Elvis Conspiracy, Cipriano rang in again as "Tom from Philadelphia" and asked if there was a possibility Presley was "disguised as Howard Stern."
- In 1996, Cipriano pretended to be a spokesperson for the Bell Telephone Company when calling reporter Bruce Hamilton on a KYW-TV report of a blizzard in Philadelphia. He said to the reporter that phone lines were down due to too many people calling the number 1-800-52-STERN. The line was for ordering the comedy VHS tape Butt Bongo Fiesta (1992) by Stern.
- On July 20, 1999, Cipriano pretended to be a representative for Coast Guard Air Station Cape Cod when calling to ABC News during their live report of the plane crash death of John F. Kennedy Jr. hosted by Peter Jennings. When asked about his locations, Cipriano responded, "Howard Stern thinks you're a [dick]." Jennings ended the call with him assuming the caller was a fan of Stern.
- During the 2003 invasion of Iraq, Cipriano called into Hardball with Chris Matthews impersonating New York Times journalist Dexter Filkins. When asked by Chris Matthews about the possibility of Iraqi civilians attacking U.S. forces, Cipriano said they were not and instead asking for tapes of Howard Stern. Matthews replied, "You're kidding!"
- On October 15, 2003, during a report of the Steve Bartman incident by the ESPN program SportsCenter, Cipriano prank-called the show faking as Bartman. A spokesperson for ESPN, Josh Krulewitz, released the following statement: "We made a mistake. We have a process in place to prevent this type of situation. In more than 24 years it hasn't happened on 'SportsCenter' before. In this instance we should have been more thorough. Once it became clear, we communicated to viewers immediately that it wasn't a real interview." The Associated Press reported "several references to the prank" that were a part of later SportsCenter showings; this included Matt Winer saying that "[Bartman] was so infamous he has his own impersonator." On the prank call's ten-year anniversary, Dan Patrick, who was an anchor at ESPN when the prank occurred, replayed the prank on his radio and DirecTV show twice.
- Cipriano prank-called the Denver, Colorado station KUSA in its live report of the July 2012 shooting of the Century 16 movie theater in Aurora, Colorado. He falsely claimed there was an additional attendant killed in the shooting.
- During a February 12, 2013 KCBS-TV report of Christopher Dorner's series of shootings, Cipriano telephoned the station as an official for California Department of Fish and Wildlife, claiming that the department discovered Dorner: "We believe it was Ronnie [Mund, Howard Stern's driver] the limo driver who fired at Mr. Dorner. He was on his way to a block party and got caught in the fire-out." When the reporter asked him for more details, Cipriano responded "You're a real dumb ass. You still don't get that this is a prank." The reporter said after Cipriano was cut off, "Apparently, some people taking advantage of live television on a very serious day here in Los Angeles."
- On July 30, 2014, Cipriano acted as a person who claimed to have seen the plane crash of the Malaysia Airlines Flight 17 shootdown when calling to MSNBC in a live report of the crash. He identified himself as staff sergeant Michael Boyd, working for the United States embassy in Ukraine's capital city Kyiv. He said to reporter Krystal Ball, "Well, I was looking out the window, and I saw a projectile flying through the sky. And it would appear that the plane was shot down by a blast of wind from Howard Stern's ass." The reporter, still unaware of Cipriano prank-calling MSNBC, responded, "So, it would appear that the plane was shot down. Can you tell us anything more from your military training, of what sort of missile system that [it] may have been coming from?" As a result of the prank, Diana Rocco said in the end of the report, "This was an unfortunate incident, and we apologize to our viewers."
- On August 24, 2014, Cipriano called CNN faking as San Francisco police department's public information officer Adam Sure during the station's coverage of the 2014 South Napa earthquake. His explanation for the earthquake was, "Because of the early morning, because it was so early in the morning, most people were at their homes when it happened, and what we believe is this was a rumbling from Howard Stern's butt crack." Reporter Christi Paul responded to the call: "Alright, obviously that is not who we expected it was to be. We apologize for that so early in the morning."

== Personal life ==
Cipriano served in the army from 1985 to 1988. The name for his alter ego Captain Janks derived from the name of the real-life army captain of the same name. In a 1996 interview, Cipriano claimed to have lost his former shipping clerk position at a medical laboratory not long ago. In 1999, he revealed he was working "for a company that manufactures toilet seats and other plastics." In 1998 and 2005, it was reported he was working at a gas station. As of 2014, he is a truck driver who resides in North Wales, Philadelphia, Pennsylvania. On a May 19, 2014, episode of The Howard Stern Show, Cipriano revealed that he was gay.

On February 8, 2010, Cipriano pled guilty to charges of theft by deception and deceptive business practices; these charges were a result of fifteen cases in thirteen different food and entertainment businesses in the counties of Montgomery, Chester, Berks, Lehigh and Bucks from October 2006 to April 2009, where he deposited from contracts to make appearances at the places but never showed up. He was sentenced by Montgomery County Court judge Steven T. O'Neill to eight years of probation, and he was required to pay $5,926 for the businesses he scammed. He attributed his actions to addiction to his prescription painkillers, and took urinalysis tests during his probation.
