= Jennifer Strong =

American soccer player (1973–2011)

Personal information
- Full name: Jennifer E. Strong
- Date of birth: June 24, 1973
- Place of birth: Lansdale, Pennsylvania, U.S.
- Date of death: March 27, 2011 (aged 37)
- Place of death: Grand Junction, Colorado, U.S.
- Position: Defender

Youth career
- –1991: North Penn Maidens

College career
Years	Team	Apps	(Gls)
1991–1992	Connecticut Huskies		
1993–1995	Barry Buccaneers	37	(4)

International career
1992	United States	1	(0)

Managerial career
- 1996: Villanova Wildcats (assistant)

Jennifer E. Strong (June 24, 1973 – March 27, 2011) was an American soccer player who played as a defender, making one appearance for the United States women's national team.

== Career ==
Strong played soccer for the North Penn Maidens in high school, before playing for the Connecticut Huskies in 1991 and 1992, where she was a letter-winner. She was included in the Soccer America All-Freshmen Team in 1991, as well as the NSCAA/Adidas All-Northeast Region and NEWISA All-New England selections in 1992. In 1993, she played for the Barry Buccaneers, helping the team to win the NCAA Division II championship. After taking a year break from soccer, she again played for the Buccaneers in 1995. In total, she scored 4 goals and recorded 8 assists in 37 appearances during her two seasons with the Buccaneers. She was an NSCAA All-American in 1995, and was selected to the NSCAA All-Region Team in 1993 and 1995. She was also included in the NCAA All-Tournament Team in 1993, and was selected as a CoSIDA Academic All-American and All-District player in 1996.

Strong made her only international appearance for the United States on August 16, 1992, in a friendly match against Norway, which finished as a 2–4 loss.

Strong was selected for the Umbro Select College All-Star Classic in 1996. Later that year she served as an assistant coach for the Villanova Wildcats. She was inducted into the Barry University Athletics Hall of Fame in 1998.

== Personal life ==
Strong graduated from the Philadelphia College of Osteopathic Medicine. She served in the United States Army for seven years and was discharged as a Major. She later worked in obstetrics and gynecology in Grand Junction, Colorado. Strong died suddenly on March 27, 2011, at the age of 37 in Grand Junction.

== Career statistics ==
=== International ===
United States
Year	Apps	Goals
1992	1	0
Total	1	0
