= Kulpsville, Pennsylvania =

Unincorporated community in Pennsylvania, US

Kulpsville
- Census-designated place
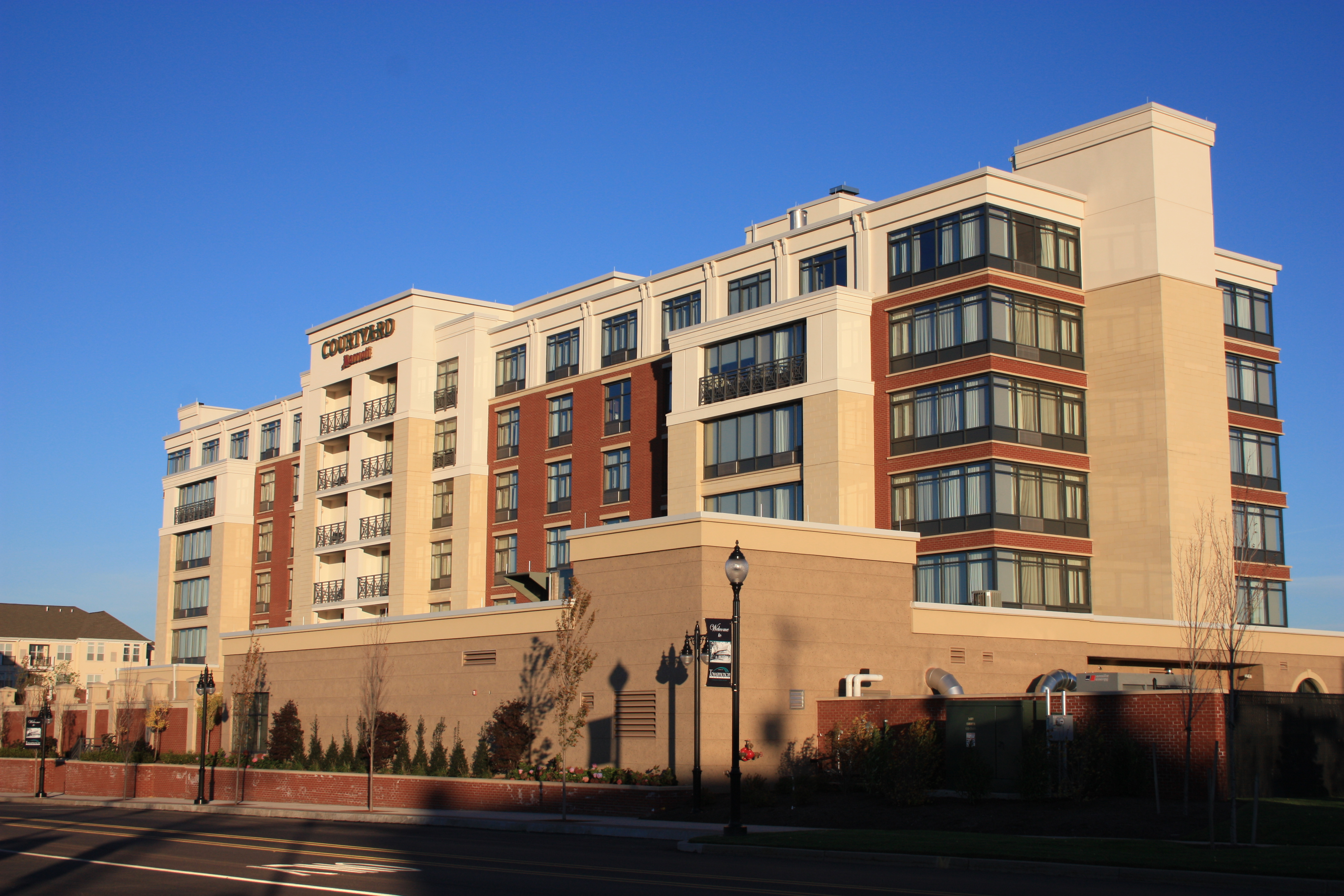
- Courtyard by Marriott hotel in Kulpsville

- Location of Kulpsville in Pennsylvania Kulpsville (the United States)
- Coordinates: 40°14′38″N 75°20′25″W
- Country: United States
- State: Pennsylvania
- County: Montgomery
- Township: Towamencin

Area
  - Total: 3.41 sq mi (8.84 km^{2})
  - Land: 3.41 sq mi (8.84 km^{2})
  - Water: 0 sq mi (0.00 km^{2})
- Elevation: 289 ft (88 m)

Population (2020)
  - Total: 8,159
  - Density: 2,389.7/sq mi (922.68/km^{2})
- Time zone: UTC-5 (EST)
  - Summer (DST): UTC-4 (EDT)
- ZIP Codes: 19443, 19438, & 19446
- Area codes: 215, 267 & 445
- FIPS code: 42-40608

Kulpsville is a census-designated place (CDP) in Montgomery County, Pennsylvania. The population was 8,194 at the 2010 census. It is located in Towamencin Township, which is part of the North Penn Valley region that is centered around the borough of Lansdale. The name is derived from the Kulp family.

== Geography ==
Kulpsville is located at 40°14′38″N 75°20′25″W (40.243993, -75.340291). According to the U.S. Census Bureau, Kulpsville has a total area of 3.4 square miles (8.8 km^{2}), all land. It is located on the Towamencin Creek, a tributary of the Skippack Creek.

PA Route 63 runs through Kulpsville, where the Lansdale interchange of the Northeast Extension of the Pennsylvania Turnpike (Interstate 476) with PA 63 is located. The CDP is served by the North Penn School District. Although it has its own post office with the ZIP code of 19443, parts of Kulpsville are served by the Harleysville and Lansdale post offices, with the ZIP codes of 19438 and 19446, respectively.

The CDP has a hot-summer humid continental climate (Dfa) and average monthly temperatures range from 30.4 °F in January to 75.1 °F in July. The hardiness zone is 6b bordering upon 7a.

== Demographics ==
Historical population
Census	Pop.	Note	%±
1990	5,183		—
2000	8,005		54.4%
2010	8,194		2.4%
2020	8,159		−0.4%

As of the 2020 census, the CDP was 74.5% Non-Hispanic White, 13.8% Black or African American, 0.1% Native American and Alaskan Native, 8.2% Asian, 0.3% were Some Other Race, and 2.5% were two or more races. 1.7% of the population were of Hispanic or Latino ancestry.

As of the 2010 census, the CDP was 83.2% Non-Hispanic White, 4.6% Black or African American, 0.0% Native American and Alaskan Native, 8.0% Asian, 0.5% were Some Other Race, and 1.8% were two or more races. 2.3% of the population were of Hispanic or Latino ancestry.

At the 2000 census, there were 8,005 people, 3,191 households, and 2,217 families living in the CDP. The population density was 2,329.0 inhabitants per square mile (899.2/km^{2}). There were 3,250 housing units at an average density of 945.6 per square mile (365.1/km^{2}). The racial makeup of the CDP was 89.93% White, 3.77% African American, 0.10% Native American, 4.51% Asian, 0.44% from other races, and 1.25% from two or more races. Hispanic or Latino of any race were 1.50%.

There were 3,191 households, out of which 35.5% had children under the age of 18 living with them, 58.2% were married couples living together, 9.2% had a female householder with no husband present, and 30.5% were non-families. 26.4% of households were made up of individuals, and 12.9% were one person aged 65 or older. The average household size was 2.49 and the average family size was 3.04.

The age distribution was 26.2% under the age of 18, 5.3% from 18 to 24, 31.6% from 25 to 44, 22.2% from 45 to 64, and 14.8% 65 or older. The median age was 37 years. For every 100 females, there were 84.6 males. For every 100 females age 18 and over, there were 79.4 males.

The median household income was $61,548 and the median family income was $73,964. Males had a median income of $57,226 versus $36,355 for females. The per capita income for the CDP was $28,244. About 1.9% of families and 2.8% of the population were below the poverty line, including 2.8% of those under age 18 and 5.3% of those age 65 or over.

== Education ==
It is part of the North Penn School District.
