= North Penn High School =

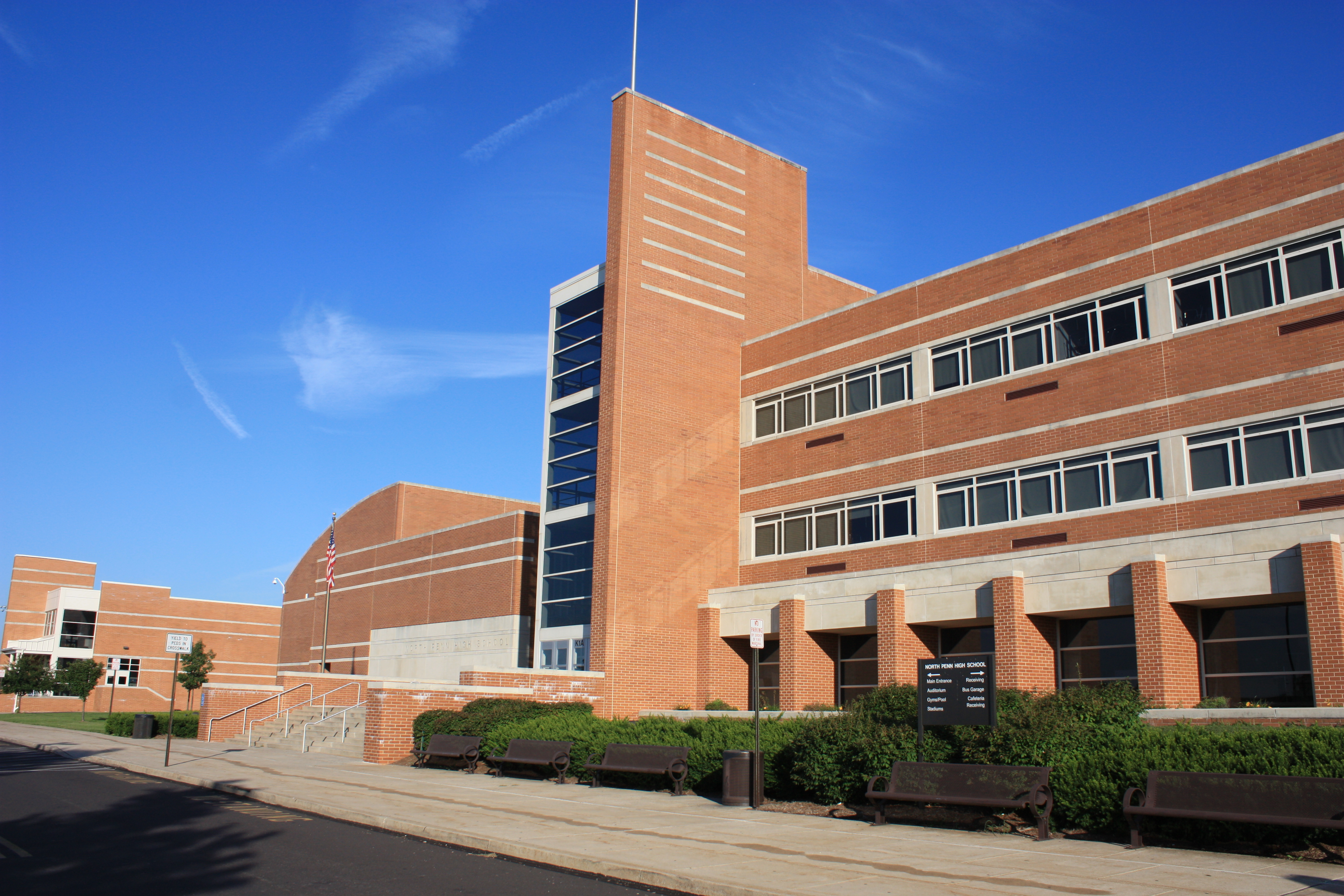

Location
- 1340 Valley Forge Road; Lansdale, Pennsylvania 19446; United States; 40°14′06″N 75°18′55″W

Information
- School type: Public
- Opened: 1955 (original building), 1971 (current building)
- School district: North Penn School District
- Superintendent: Todd Bauer
- CEEB code: 392155
- NCES School ID: 421728005345
- Principal: Kyle Hassler
- Teaching staff: 220.37 FTEs
- Grades: 10–12
- Enrollment: 3,165 (As of 2026-2027)
- Student to teacher ratio: 14.57
- Colors: Navy and Columbia blue
- Nickname: Knights
- Publication: The Troubadour (literary magazine)
- Newspaper: Knight Crier
- Yearbook: The Accolade
- Website: nphs.npenn.org

North Penn High School is a part of the North Penn School District, and is located in Towamencin Township, Pennsylvania, about a mile outside of Lansdale, Pennsylvania and 25 miles northwest of Philadelphia, on Valley Forge Road, also known as Pennsylvania Route 363.

As of the 2021–22 school year, the school had an enrollment of 3,138 students and 214.8 classroom teachers (on an FTE basis), for a student–teacher ratio of 14.6:1. There were 785 students (25.0% of enrollment) eligible for free lunch and 50 (1.6% of students) eligible for reduced-cost lunch.

== History ==
North Penn High School was created in 1955 as the result of a consolidation of seven school districts in Montgomery County (Hatfield Joint Consolidated, Lansdale Borough, Line Lexington Independent, Montgomery Township, North Wales Borough, Towamencin Township and Upper Gwynedd Township) to educate students from three former high schools: Hatfield High School, Lansdale High School, and North Wales High School.

The original North Penn High School building was an expansion of the building that had served as Lansdale High School since the 1930s. The former Hatfield and North Wales buildings were eventually converted to elementary schools. The North Wales building is still used for this purpose today. The Hatfield building, later renamed the E.B. Laudenslager Elementary School, was replaced by a newer building in 1971. The current North Penn High School was constructed in 1971 because of severe overcrowding at the original school. The former high school building, located on Penn Street in Lansdale, is now Penndale Middle School.

== Athletics ==
In 2005, 2006, and 2007, Sports Illustrated distinguished North Penn as having the best athletic program in Pennsylvania, noting that the school has "won 45 state championships over the last 10 years" and "is a power in football and is also dominant in boys' swimming." The North Penn Football team won the 2003 AAAA State Championship with a 15-0 season record. In 2025, the North Penn Boys Cross Country team won the state title at the 2025 PIAA Boys AAA Cross Country State Championship with 115 points. The school is also prominent in boys' and girls' water polo, boys' winter track, spring track, and more recently baseball and softball.

== Theater ==
In 2023, North Penn's theatre department won exclusive rights in Pennsylvania to perform Frozen as performed on Broadway. This was a result of the "United States of Frozen" competition, which granted one high school in each state the materials to perform the show for the very first time.

== Notable alumni ==
- Matt Ammendola, former professional football player, Arizona Cardinals, New York Jets, and Houston Texans
- Andrew Bryniarski, film and television actor, Leatherface in the 2003 remake of The Texas Chainsaw Massacre
- Dan Campbell, lead vocalist of rock band The Wonder Years
- Jay Caufield, former professional hockey player, Minnesota North Stars, New York Rangers, and Pittsburgh Penguins
- Amie Harwick (1981–2020), former Hollywood sex therapist and author
- Edwin Kneedler, former Deputy Solicitor General of the United States who has argued more U.S. Supreme Court cases than any other living person
- Sharon Little, singer and songwriter
- Steve Malagari, current Pennsylvania State Representative for District 53
- Mandy Mango, drag queen and nurse
- Missy Mazzoli, composer and pianist
- Sean McDermott, former head coach of the Buffalo Bills
- Brandon McManus, professional football player, Green Bay Packers
- John Oates, rock musician, Hall & Oates
- Rozes, musician, singer, and songwriter
- Gretchen Sisson, sociologist and writer
- Jennifer Strong, former U.S. women's national soccer team member
- Reece Udinski, former college football player
- Kuhoo Verma, actress
- Liza Weil, actress, Paris Geller on Gilmore Girls and Bonnie Winterbottom on How to Get Away with Murder
- Yolanda Wisher, poet
