= North Penn School District =

School district in Pennsylvania

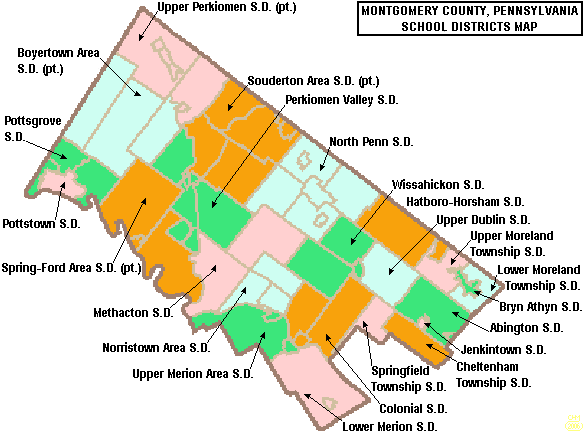
- North Penn School District is in blue at the Northeast Central part of the county.

Address
- 401 E Hancock St Lansdale, Pennsylvania, 19446-3960; United States

District information
- Type: Public

Students and staff
- District mascot: Knight
- Colors: Navy and Columbia Blue

Other information
- Website: www.npenn.org

The North Penn School District (NPSD) is a suburban public school district. It is composed of thirteen elementary schools, three middle schools, one alternative school, and one high school. As of the 2021-2022 school year, it serves 12,783 students the North Penn Valley, a 42-square-mile (110 km^{2}) area in the Montgomery County suburbs of Philadelphia, Pennsylvania.

The district serves the municipalities of North Wales Borough, Lansdale Borough, Hatfield Borough, Upper Gwynedd Township, Towamencin Township, Montgomery Township, and Hatfield Township. The Montgomeryville census-designated place is located in the district.

The district extends into Bucks County, where it includes small portions of Hilltown Township and New Britain Township.

== List of schools ==
- North Penn High School, Towamencin Township
- Northbridge School, Hatfield
- Pennbrook Middle School, North Wales
- Penndale Middle School, Lansdale
- Pennfield Middle School, Hatfield Township
- A.M. Kulp Elementary School, Hatfield
- Bridle Path Elementary School, Montgomery Township
- General Nash Elementary School, Towamencin Township
- Gwyn Nor Elementary School, Upper Gwynedd Township
- Gywnedd Square Elementary School, Lansdale
- Hatfield Elementary School, Hatfield
- Inglewood Elementary School, Towamencin Township
- Knapp Elementary School, Lansdale
- Montgomery Elementary School, Montgomery Township
- North Wales Elementary School, North Wales
- Oak Park Elementary School, Lansdale
- Walton Farm Elementary School, Towamencin Township
- York Avenue Elementary School, Lansdale
