= Towamencin Township, Pennsylvania =

Township in Pennsylvania, US

Towamencin Township
- Home-rule township
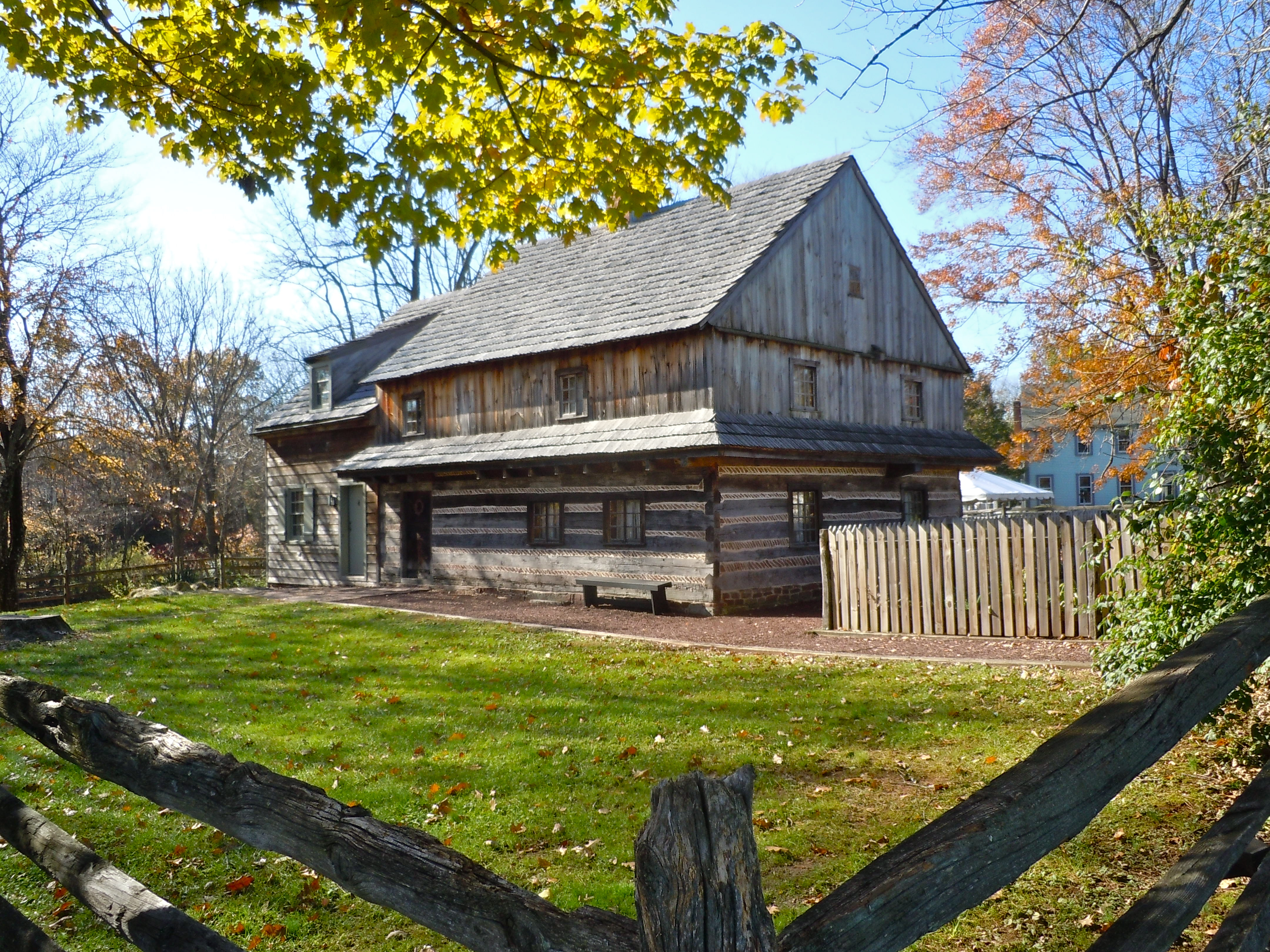
- Edward Morgan Log House

- Seal
- Motto: A Community of Tradition and Vision
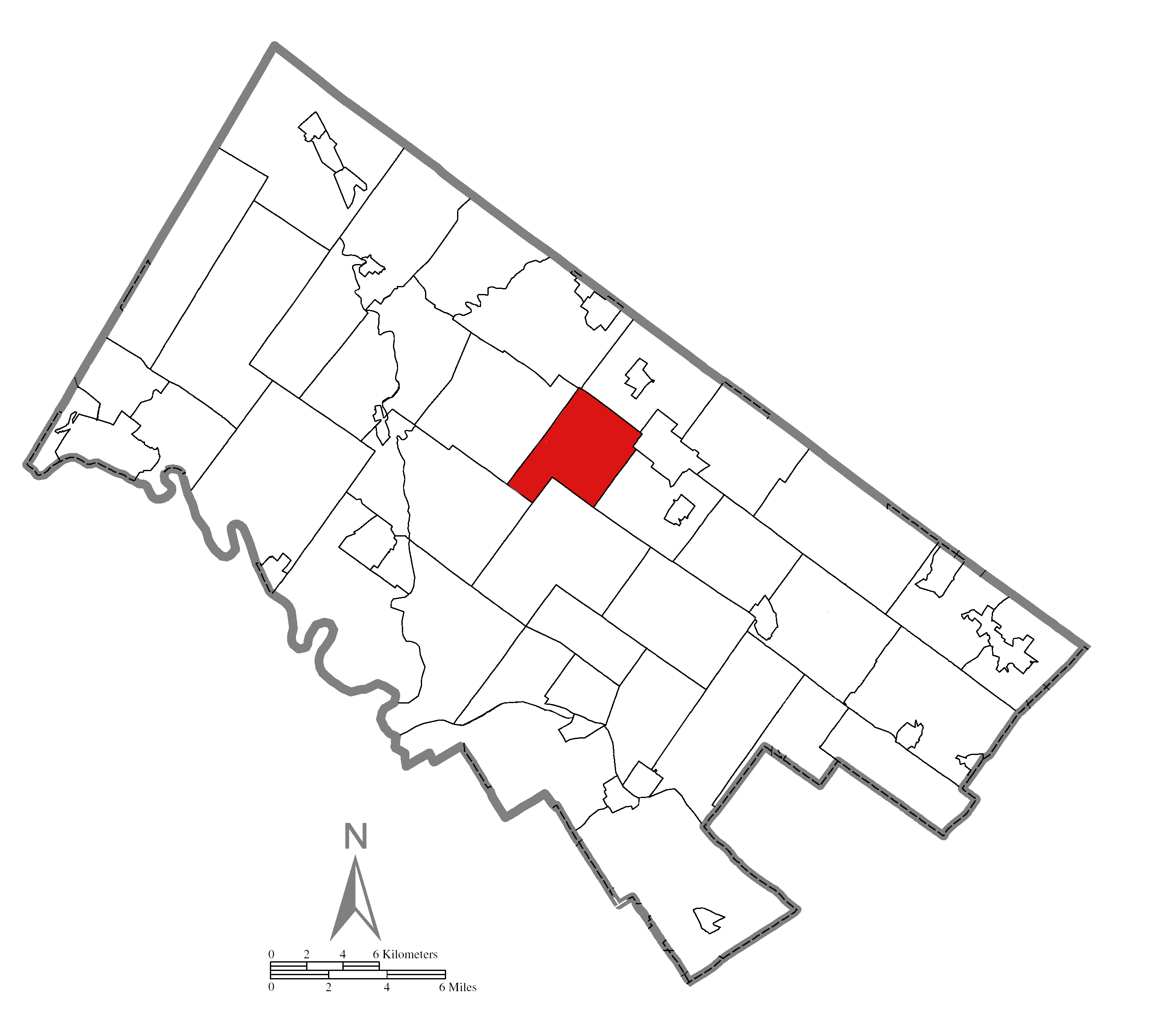
- Location of Towamencin Township in Montgomery County
- Coordinates: 40°14′23″N 75°19′48″W
- Country: United States
- State: Pennsylvania
- County: Montgomery
- Erected: 1729

Government
  - Type: Council–manager
  - Township Manager: David Kraynik

Area
  - Total: 9.68 sq mi (25.1 km^{2})
  - Land: 9.68 sq mi (25.1 km^{2})
  - Water: 0.00 sq mi (0 km^{2})
- Elevation: 226 ft (69 m)

Population (2020)
  - Total: 18,002
  - Estimate (2025): 17,955 ▼
  - Density: 1,860/sq mi (718/km^{2})
- Time zone: UTC-5 (EST)
  - Summer (DST): UTC-4 (EDT)
- Area codes: 215, 267, 445, 610, 484
- FIPS code: 42-091-77152
- Website: www.towamencin.org

Towamencin Township is a home-rule township in Montgomery County, Pennsylvania, United States. The population was 17,578 at the 2010 census. It is part of the North Penn School District and the North Penn Valley region that is centered around the borough of Lansdale. Towamencin has residential neighborhoods, historic farmhouses, recreational facilities, many schools, and open spaces. The community is a mix of residential, commercial and rural development. The Township is centrally located within Montgomery County with easy access to the Pennsylvania Turnpike’s Northeast Extension.

== Etymology ==
The name Towamencin is of Native American origin, although there exists some disagreement about the name's history. Some early sources, such as the 1850 United States census, record the township's name as "Towamensing." The Towamensing name appears on local tax records as late as 1922, although the 1920 census records the township with the modern spelling of Towamencin. According to History of Montgomery County, Pennsylvania, Volume II, both the Towamensing and Towamencin spellings were in use circa 1884. The same source cites Towamensing as the original spelling, but notes that the Towamencin spelling was in use for government records in Norristown. It is unclear when the modern spelling of Towamencin was universally adopted.

The name "Towamensing" is Lenape in origin and means either "the place of feeding cattle" or "pasture land," or "a fording place at the falls". However, an alternative source claims that, while the name Towamencin is of Native American origin, it instead means "poplar tree."

A third source claims that the name was derived from an existing Native American name for Towamencin Creek, rather than the creek being named for the township. This claim is supported by the petition to erect the Township, which indicated that "The desire of the Subscibers is that the township may be called Touamensen being the Indian name of the Creek y^{t} springs & runs through the same."

An alternative local legend is that a local landowner, Heinrich Fry, purchased some land near what is now known as the Towamencin Creek. On this tract of land was a Native village whose chief spoke broken English. He observed one day two men clearing trees near the creek and said "Towha-men-seen", meaning "Two men seen." As the legend goes, the chief's pronunciation stuck, and is how Towamencin got its name.

== History ==
=== Founding ===
The first settlers, of German, Welsh, and Dutch descent, arrived in Towamencin Township around the turn of the 18th century. They mainly pursued agricultural endeavors to sustain their livelihood.

The first grant of land in Towamencin Township was in 1703 from William Penn's Commissioners to Benjamin Furley on June 8. The Commissioners granted 1,000 acres (4 km^{2}) to him. On June 17 of that same year, Abraham Tennis and Jan Lucken bought the property from him, and then divided the land in half in 1709. The Edward Morgan Log House stands on land that was part of 600 acres (2.4 km^{2}) granted to Griffith Jones by the Commissioners. Edward Morgan purchased 309 acres (1.25 km^{2}) of this land, which included an existing "dwelling house", from Griffith Jones on February 26, 1708. In 1720, his daughter Sarah, who in 1734 would give birth to the famous frontiersman Daniel Boone, married Squire Boone. The land containing the house was then deeded to John Morgan, son of Edward, on August 23, 1723, as part of a 104-acre (.42 km^{2}) tract.

Towamencin Township was erected when the Court of Quarter Sessions of Philadelphia County confirmed a petition presented to its session held on March 3, 1728/1729 (O.S.) [March 14, 1729 (N.S.)], requesting the formation of a township of about 5,500 acres.

In 1734, there were 32 landholders within the Township, with William Tennis having the most area at 250 acres (1 km^{2}).

=== The Indians of Towamencin ===
The American Indians who inhabited the area were the Lenni Lenape. They lived in Pennsylvania, as well as Delaware, New Jersey, and parts of Maryland. They were divided into three tribes: the Turtle, Turkeys, and Wolf, which were subdivided into clans, each clan having a name representing the character and situation of the tribe as a whole.

The Indians of Towamencin Township are of the Delaware Nation. They had a settlement in the southwest section of the Township along the Towamencin Creek. They established friendly relations with the settlers when they came to the Township. There are some accounts of violence attributed to the Indians, but they cannot be proven and are probably fictional. There are many accounts of Indians helping to tend the sick, and trading food and goods with the settlers.

It is not recorded when the tribes of Indians left Towamencin; it is suspected they left after the Revolutionary War.

The Maltese Cross of the Towamencin Volunteer Fire Company has an American Indian in the center.

=== American Revolutionary War ===
Pennsylvania is known as the Keystone State for its role in the Revolution, and as one of the oldest settlements during the time, Towamencin Township played a part: the Township had encampments of soldiers, had many citizens that served, and was the retreating place for General Washington and his troops after the Battle of Germantown.

The Continental Army troops were in Towamencin from October 8, 1777, to October 16, 1777 and camped in the Northern section of the Township. The Township provided a secure area to rest, without fear of surprise attack by the British.

Washington commandeered Frederick Wampole's house to establish his quarters and conducted military duties from there. The house was located on Wambold Road.

General Francis Nash was wounded at the Battle of Germantown and was carried from Germantown to Towamencin. He was cared for in a house, according to Washington's writings, located "a mile-and-a-quarter south of the Great North Wales Turnpike," now Sumneytown Pike, along with other wounded men of the Battle of Germantown. He died two days later and is buried at the present-day Towamencin Mennonite Church cemetery, known then as the Towamencin Mennonite Meetinghouse.

It was reported that Henry Cassel, whose land was used as an encampment by the Colonists, submitted to the Continental Congress an estimate of damages to his property by Washington's Army. The damage was to 696 fence rails used for firewood. The cost to replace those rails was 8.14 pounds. It is not known whether the newly formed government paid.

=== Home rule ===
In May 2022, the Towamencin Board of Supervisors approved the sale of the township's sewer system, with four in favor and one against. The privatization effort was met with opposition by some residents, and prior to the authorization of the sale, a group known as Towamencin N.O.P.E. (Neighbors Opposing Privatization Efforts) was set up in an attempt to block the move. Following the approval of the sale, Towamencin NOPE pivoted to campaigning for the township to adopt a home rule charter in an attempt to block the sale. In response to the move, the Board of Supervisors issued a statement questioning the legality of unilaterally terminating the sale, while a rival group, TRUST Towamencin, was established to oppose the adoption of home rule.

On November 8, 2022, residents of Towamencin voted in favor of forming a government study commission to draft a home rule charter. Unofficial results showed that 60% of residents voted in favor of forming the commission, and that the full slate of candidates backed by Towamencin NOPE backing the charter had been elected to the commission. In March 2023, the government study commission put forward a proposed home rule charter to be placed on the ballot during the May 16 primary. Under the proposal, the township would retain its form of government, but with provisions for increased government transparency, a prohibition on the sale of municipally owned water systems, and allowing residents to submit initiatives or referendums to the ballot.

On May 16, 2023, residents of the township voted in favor of adopting the proposed home rule charter, with approximately 53% of voters supporting the measure. The new charter took effect on July 1, 2023.

== Geography ==
According to the United States Census Bureau, the township has a total area of 9.7 square miles (25.1 km^{2}), all land. It is drained via the Skippack Creek into the Perkiomen Creek and Schuylkill River. Its villages include Inglewood, Kulpsville, and Oak Park (also in Hatfield Township.)

=== Climate ===
According to the Köppen climate classification system, Towamencin is located in zone Dfa, indicating a humid continental climate with hot summers. Its USDA plant hardiness zone is 6b, except in some lower areas where it is 7a. The warmest month is typically July, with an average maximum temperature of 85.7 °F (29.8 °C). Between 1895 and 2019, the average July maximum temperature never fell below 81 °F (27 °C), and rose above 90 °F (32 °C) in 1955, 1999, and 2011. Over the same period, the January mean temperature ranged from 19.3 °F (−7 °C) in 1918 and 1977 to a peak of 42 °F (5.5 °C) in 1932. January 1918 also recorded the lowest average maximum temperature, at 27.5 °F (−2.5 °C). The typical January has a daily mean temperature of 31 °F (−0.5 °C). The mean temperature in July is 76 °F (24 °C). The hot season lasts from late May through mid-September, while the cold season typically runs from December through early March. The highest recorded temperature in the township was 103.2 °F (39.6 °C) in 2011, and the lowest recorded temperature was −10.7 °F (−23.7 °C) in 1984.

Climate data for Towamencin Township, 1981–2010 Averages
Month	Jan	Feb	Mar	Apr	May	Jun	Jul	Aug	Sep	Oct	Nov	Dec	Year
Record high °F (°C)	73 (23)	75 (24)	85 (29)	95 (35)	96 (36)	99 (37)	103.2 (39.6)	101.5 (38.6)	102 (39)	89 (32)	83 (28)	75 (24)	103.2 (39.6)
Mean daily maximum °F (°C)	39.1 (3.9)	42.3 (5.7)	50.6 (10.3)	62.6 (17.0)	72.9 (22.7)	81.6 (27.6)	85.7 (29.8)	84.2 (29.0)	77.1 (25.1)	65.6 (18.7)	54.6 (12.6)	43.2 (6.2)	63.3 (17.4)
Mean daily minimum °F (°C)	21.8 (−5.7)	24.0 (−4.4)	30.9 (−0.6)	40.5 (4.7)	49.9 (9.9)	59.5 (15.3)	64.4 (18.0)	62.9 (17.2)	54.9 (12.7)	42.9 (6.1)	34.5 (1.4)	26.1 (−3.3)	42.7 (5.9)
Record low °F (°C)	−10.7 (−23.7)	−6 (−21)	0 (−18)	18 (−8)	29 (−2)	39 (4)	49 (9)	43 (6)	34 (1)	25 (−4)	13 (−11)	−2 (−19)	−10.7 (−23.7)
Average precipitation inches (mm)	3.33 (85)	2.70 (69)	3.73 (95)	3.90 (99)	4.19 (106)	4.10 (104)	4.73 (120)	4.04 (103)	4.53 (115)	4.04 (103)	3.62 (92)	3.89 (99)	46.8 (1,190)
Average precipitation days (≥ 0.1 in)	11	9	11	11	12	11	10	10	9	8	10	11	123
Average dew point °F (°C)	20.8 (−6.2)	22.3 (−5.4)	27.8 (−2.3)	37.6 (3.1)	48.5 (9.2)	59.2 (15.1)	63.6 (17.6)	63.1 (17.3)	56.5 (13.6)	44.9 (7.2)	35.1 (1.7)	25.7 (−3.5)	42.1 (5.6)
Mean daily daylight hours	10	11	12	13	14	15	14	13	13	11	10	9	12
Source: PRISM

== Demographics ==
Historical population
Census	Pop.	Note	%±
1800	413		—
1810	488		18.2%
1820	571		17.0%
1830	668		17.0%
1840	763		14.2%
1850	904		18.5%
1860	1,137		25.8%
1870	1,209		6.3%
1880	1,282		6.0%
1890	1,140		−11.1%
1900	1,005		−11.8%
1910	1,160		15.4%
1920	1,166		0.5%
1930	1,275		9.3%
1940	1,412		10.7%
1950	1,604		13.6%
1960	3,724		132.2%
1970	4,738		27.2%
1980	11,112		134.5%
1990	14,167		27.5%
2000	17,597		24.2%
2010	17,578		−0.1%
2020	18,009		2.5%
2025 (est.)	17,955		−0.3%
U.S. Decennial Census

As of the 2010 census, the township was 85.1% White, 4.1% Black or African American, 0.1% Native American, 8.4% Asian, and 1.6% were two or more races. 2.5% of the population were of Hispanic or Latino ancestry.

As of the census of 2000, 17,597 people, 6,872 households, and 4,810 families resided in the township. The population density was 1,815.6 inhabitants per square mile (701.0/km^{2}). There were 7,035 housing units at an average density of 725.9 per square mile (280.3/km^{2}). The racial makeup of the township was 88.30% White, 3.47% African American, 0.09% Native American, 6.23% Asian, 0.02% Pacific Islander, 0.52% from other races, and 1.37% from two or more races. Hispanic or Latino of any race were 1.65% of the population.

There were 6,872 households, out of which 34.0% had children under the age of 18 living with them, 60.3% were married couples living together, 7.3% had a female householder with no husband present, and 30.0% were non-families. 25.7% of all households were made up of individuals, and 11.9% had someone living alone who was 65 years of age or older. The average household size was 2.55 and the average family size was 3.11.

In the township the population was spread out, with 25.2% under the age of 18, 6.0% from 18 to 24, 30.5% from 25 to 44, 24.6% from 45 to 64, and 13.6% who were 65 years of age or older. The median age was 38 years. For every 100 females, there were 90.6 males. For every 100 females age 18 and over, there were 86.5 males.

The median income for a household in the township was $66,736, and the median income for a family was $80,167. Males had a median income of $56,870 versus $36,879 for females. The per capita income for the township was $30,559. About 1.4% of families and 2.9% of the population were below the poverty line, including 2.1% of those under age 18 and 7.8% of those age 65 or over.

== Economy ==
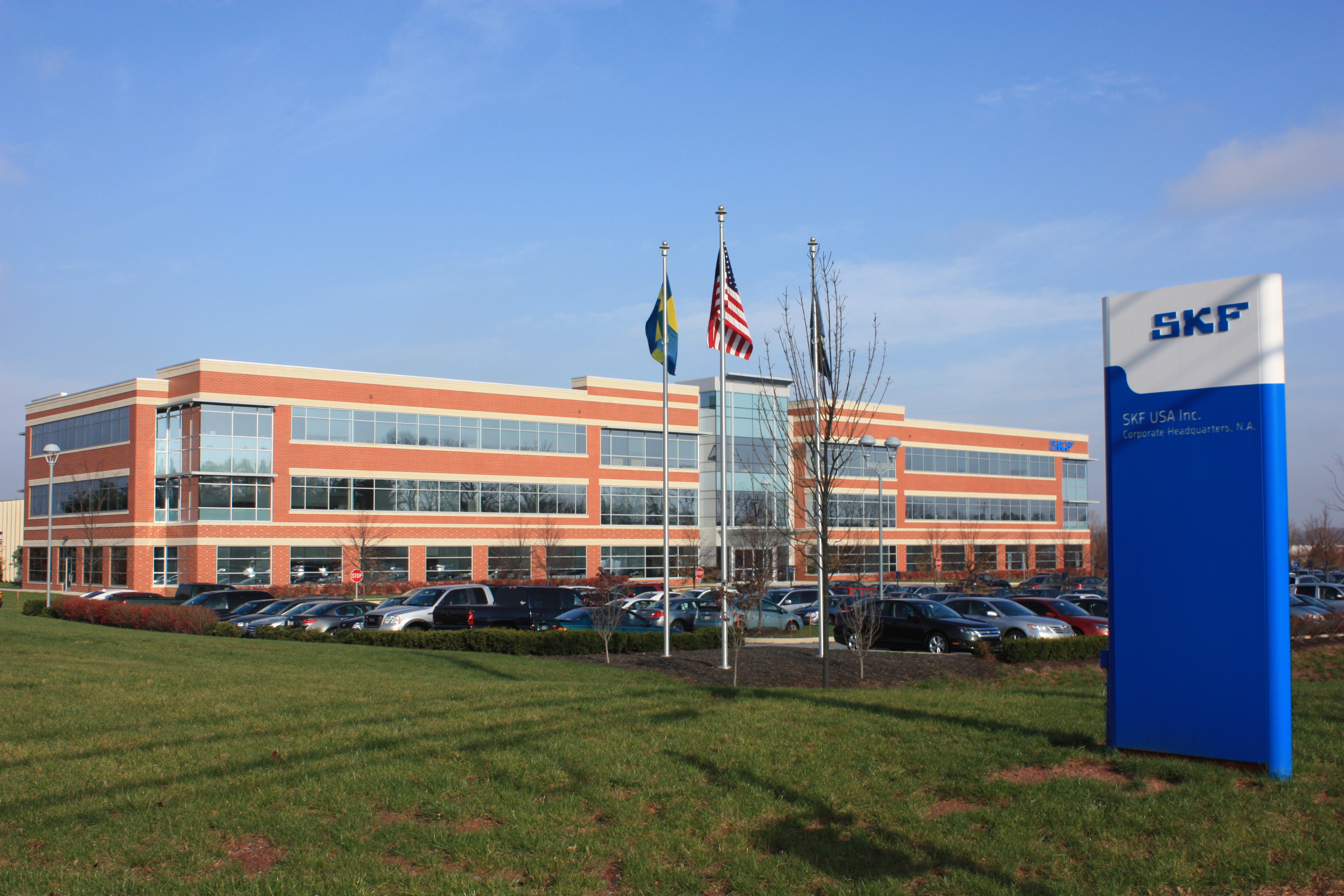
The North American headquarters of SKF is located in Towamencin; the company is one of the largest employers in the township.

From its founding through much of the 20th century, Towamencin was a rural community and accordingly its economy was built around agriculture. In addition to agricultural pursuits, in the late 18th century the township was home to two inns and four mills. By 1884, while the township remained primarily agricultural, it was also home to "two hotels, one store, [and] several carriage manufacturies" as well as local artisans. Another mill and adjoining general store was erected in 1894, which still stands today as a restaurant.

Today, Towamencin is a suburban community and its economy has shifted away from agriculture. The modern Towamencin is a commuter town. Only 6% of Towamencin's population both live and work within the boundaries of the township. The average commute time for residents of the township is 31 minutes, longer than the averages of both Montgomery County and Pennsylvania as a whole. The largest employer in Towamencin is the North Penn School District. Other major employers in the township are Greene Tweed & Company, Inc., and SKF USA, both in the manufacturing sector. According to the U.S. Census Bureau, 66.3% of the township's working age population were in the labor force between 2014 and 2018. This is slightly higher than the overall U.S. labor force participation rate for the same period, when it was approximately 62%.

== Government and politics ==
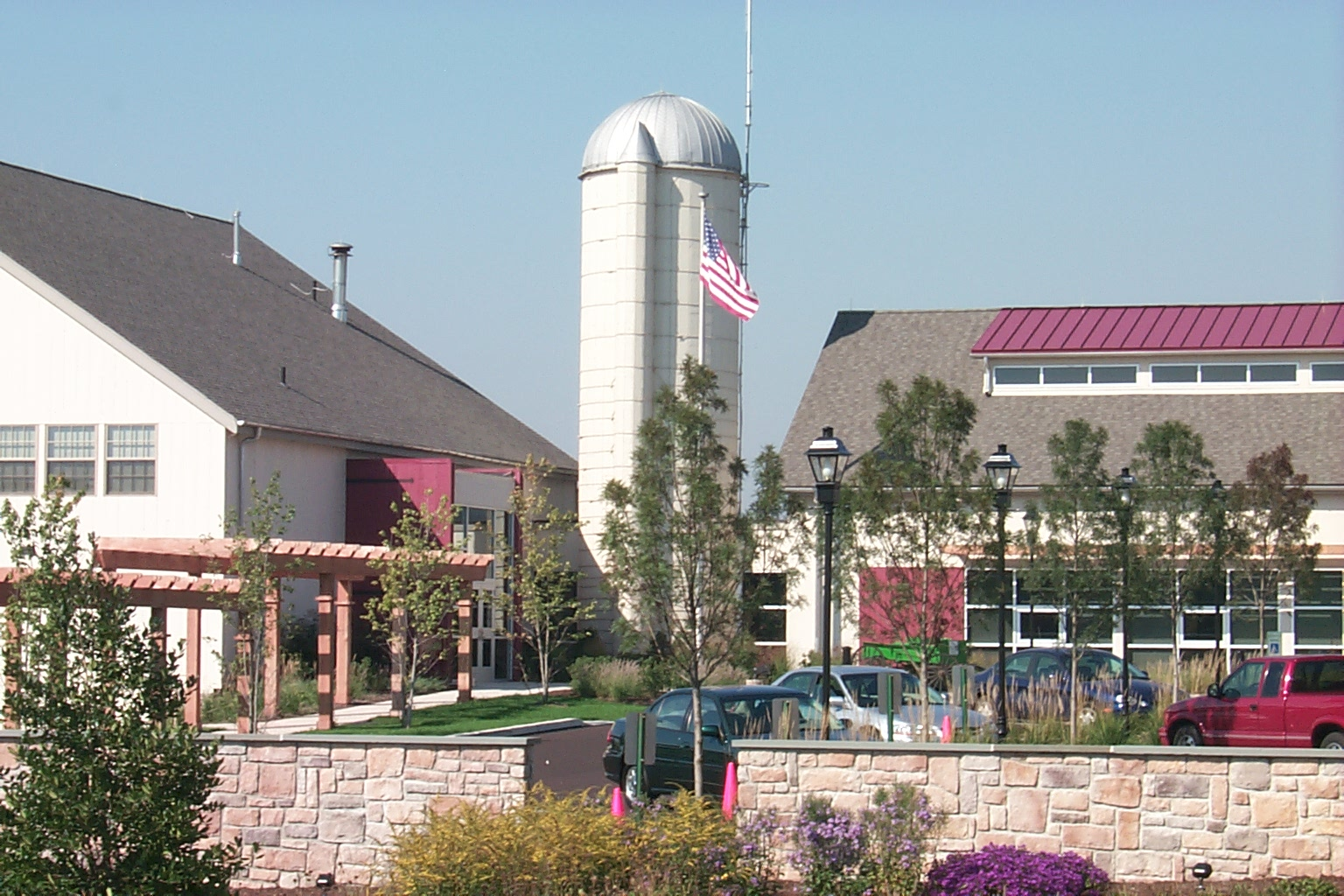
The Towamencin Township municipal building

Towamencin Township is classified as a second-class township by the Commonwealth of Pennsylvania. The township is governed by a five-member Board of Supervisors, who are elected on an at-large basis and serve a six-year term of office. Elections to the Board of Supervisors take place in odd-numbered years, with elections staggered such that two seats come up for election every two years, with the exception of the sixth year in the cycle, when only one seat comes up for election. Under Section 607 of the Second Class Township Code the Board of Supervisors is "charged with the general governance of the township and the execution of legislative, executive and administrative powers in order to ensure sound fiscal management and to secure the health, safety and welfare of the citizens of the township." The Board of Supervisors is further empowered to appoint the township manager, as well as the membership of various boards and commissions, including the Zoning Hearing Board and the township's Planning Commission. The Board meets twice monthly to review all issues before the township and provide policy direction to the appointed staff. During the months of October, November, and December public hearings are held for the purpose of reviewing the budget for the following year.

On January 24, 2025, former Vice Chairwoman Laura C. Smith was seen and recorded ending a public social media post with a Nazi salute, emulating the same gesture repeatedly made by Elon Musk during Donald Trump's presidential inauguration on January 20, 2025. On January 26, 2025, Smith resigned from the Towamencin Township Board of Supervisors. On May 14, 2025, Amer Barghouth was sworn in as the new township supervisor after being appointed by the county court of common pleas. Barghouth served the remainder of Smith's term through 2025.

As of January 2026, the Board of Supervisors consists of:

- Joyce F. Snyder, Chairperson
- Vanessa Gaynor, Vice Chair
- Kofi Osei, Secretary
- Kristin Warner, Treasurer
- Courtney Morgan, Assistant Secretary/Assistant Treasurer

=== Politics ===
Presidential election results
Year	Republican	Democratic
2024	42.0% 4,964	56.1% 6,625
2020	41.7% 4,835	57.4% 6,675
2016	43.5% 4,500	51.7% 5,353
2012	49.3% 4,735	49.5% 4,747
2008	45.9% 4,463	53.2% 5,166
2004	54.0% 5,150	45.5% 4,343
2000	54.2% 4,366	43.0% 3,458
1996	50.2% 3,436	39.6% 2,708
1992	44.3% 3,060	34.2% 2,364

Historically, Towamencin leaned Republican. Prior to the founding of the Republican Party, the township was known to favor the Federalist Party and the Whig Party. In the 1832 Pennsylvania gubernatorial election, Anti-Masonic candidate Joseph Ritner won 85% of the vote in Towamencin. Despite being a descendant of one of Towamencin's founding families, Jacksonian Democrat Jacob Fry Jr. won only 13 of Towamencin's votes in his 1836 campaign for Pennsylvania's 5th congressional district, compared to 77 votes for Whig candidate Daniel M. Mulvaney. In 1863, the township voted Republican by a margin of 186 to 79, and in the 1896 United States presidential election the township favored William McKinley by a margin of 245 to 36. In the 2001 municipal election, five Republicans ran for the Board of Supervisors compared to one Democrat, and between 1993 and 2021 all members of the Board of Supervisors were Republicans. Republicans also historically held a slight edge in voter registration. As of May 27, 2020, there were 12,876 registered voters in the township. Of those, 5,488 (42.62%) were registered Republicans, compared to 5,418 (42.07%) registered Democrats, with the remainder unaffiliated or members of third parties.

Despite these historic trends, however, as with the rest of Montgomery County, the Democratic Party has made gains in Towamencin in the twenty-first century. In 2008, Republicans accounted for 51% of registered voters in the township, compared to 46% in 2016 and 44% in 2019. Over the same period, the share of registered Democrats rose from 34.74% to 40.48%. By May 2022, the number of registered Democrats eclipsed the share of registered Republicans, with the Democratic Party holding a lead of 221 registered voters.

Electorally, Towamencin was also carried by the Democratic nominee for President of the United States in each election since 2008. Further, Towamencin voted for Democratic Governor Tom Wolf in 2014 and during the 2018 midterm elections the township also voted for the Democratic candidate for each office on the ballot. During the 2021 municipal elections, Democrat Joyce F. Snyder was also elected to the Board of Supervisors. Snyder's victory made her the first Democrat to hold a seat on the board since 1992, and was further accompanied by the victory of Democratic nominee Melissa Fusco to the position of township auditor.

As of 2020, the township is now part of:

- Pennsylvania's 24th State Senatorial district represented by Republican Tracy Pennycuick
- Pennsylvania's 61st State Representative district represented by Democrat Liz Hanbidge
- Pennsylvania's 4th congressional district represented by Democrat Madeleine Dean

== Transportation ==
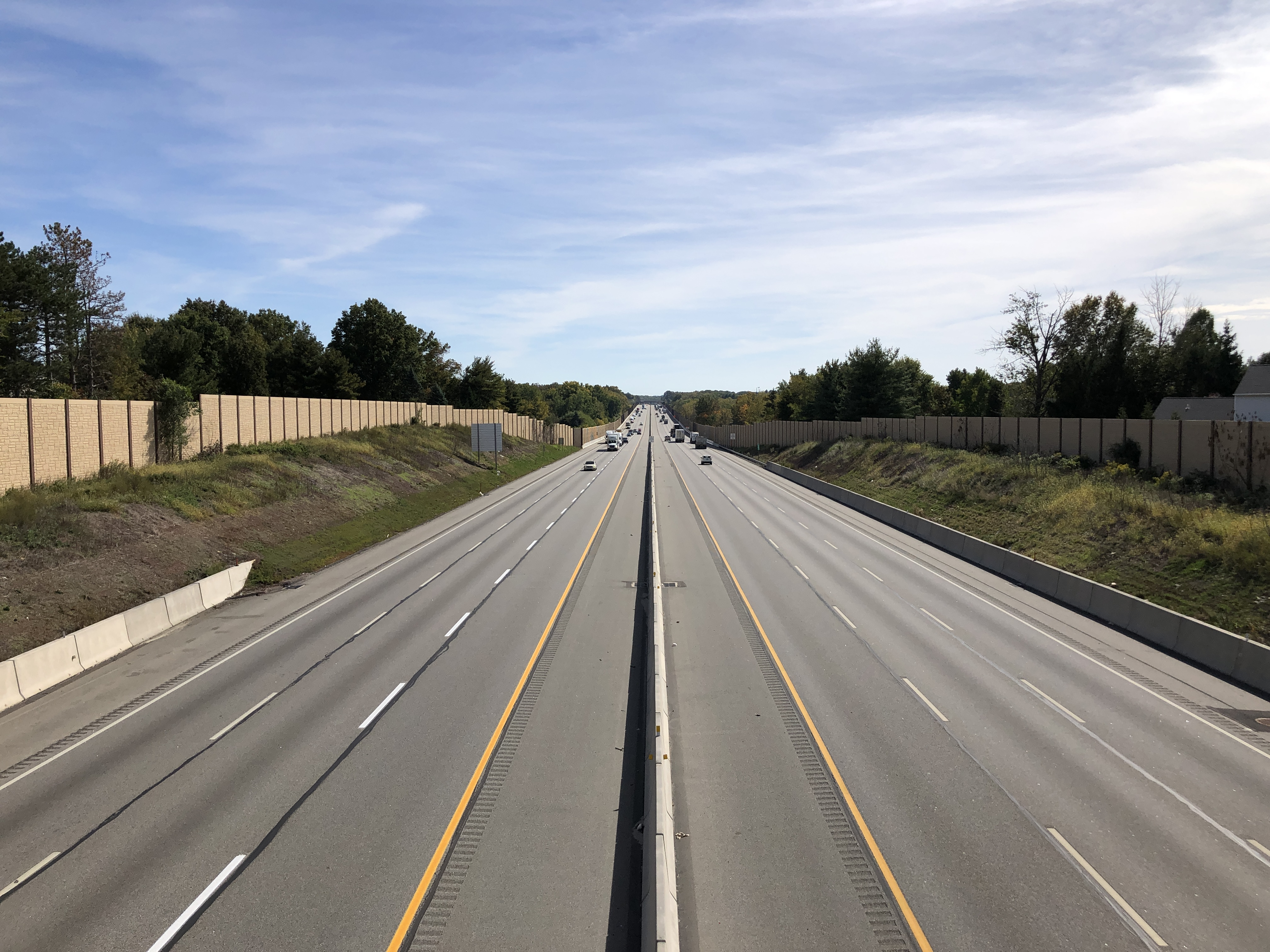
I-476/Pennsylvania Turnpike Northeast Extension southbound in Towamencin Township

As of 2016 there were 73.91 miles (118.95 km) of public roads in Towamencin Township, of which 3.20 miles (5.15 km) were maintained by the Pennsylvania Turnpike Commission (PTC), 12.98 miles (20.89 km) were maintained by the Pennsylvania Department of Transportation (PennDOT) and 57.73 miles (92.91 km) were maintained by the township.

The Pennsylvania Turnpike Northeast Extension (I-476) is the most prominent highway serving Towamencin Township. It follows a southeast–northwest alignment through the center of the township, interchanging with Pennsylvania Route 63. PA 63 follows an east–west alignment through the northern portions of the township by utilizing Sumneytown Pike, Forty Foot Road and Welsh Road. One additional numbered highway, Pennsylvania Route 363, follows the township's southeastern boundary.

SEPTA provides Suburban Bus service to the northeastern portion of Towamencin Township along Route 132, which runs between the Montgomery Mall and Telford. The Lansdale station along SEPTA Regional Rail's Lansdale/Doylestown Line is located in neighboring Lansdale.

== Education ==
The township is a member of the North Penn School District. North Penn High School is located within the township, as are General Nash, Walton Farm, and Inglewood elementary schools. Private schools within Towamencin include Dock Mennonite Academy and Calvary Baptist School.

Towamencin is also home to the North Montco Technical Career Center, a vocational school jointly operated by the North Penn, Souderton Area, Perkiomen Valley, Wissahickon, and Methacton school districts.

The Culinary Arts Institute of Montgomery County Community College is located in downtown Towamencin.

Sources: U.S. Census Bureau, 2000 Census	Towamencin		PA	US
	Number		Nbr	Nbr
Population 25 and older	12,085			
	Number	Pct	Pct	Pct
High school graduates (includes equivalency)	2,657	22.0	38.1	28.6
Some college, or associate degree	3,246	26.9	21.4	27.4
Bachelor's degree	3,246	26.9	14.0	15.5
Master's, professional or doctorate degree	1,957	16.2	8.4	8.9
SCHOOL ENROLLMENT	Number			
Population 3 years and over enrolled in school	4,527			
	Number	Pct	Pct	Pct
Preschool and kindergarten	638	14.1	11.6	11.9
Grades 1–12	2,904	64.1	66.0	65.3
College	985	21.8	22.4	22.8

== Parks and recreation ==
Arneth Entertainment Center

Local Artists Design Memory Wall Students from General Nash, Walton Farm, and Inglewood Elementary along with members of the North Penn High School Art Club created more than 75 original ceramic tiles depicting "Life in Fischer's Park". Mounted in a fieldstone masonry wall, it serves as a perfect gateway to the Arneth Entertainment Center.

Towamencin has more than 10 sites and 300 acres (1.2 km^{2}) of parklands and open spaces, ranging in size from neighborhood squares to sprawling meadows. There are natural resource areas as well as active recreation sites with varying amenities including tennis courts, play lots, jogging/exercise trails, picnic pavilions, playing fields, basketball courts and sand volleyball courts.

In 2006, the Board of Supervisors adopted an extensive Open Space Plan in accordance with the Montgomery County Green Fields/Green Towns Program that provides open space grants for acquisition, development and historic structure protection efforts.

- Fischer's Park is the Township's largest recreational facility. At 77 acres (310,000 m^{2}) the park boasts numerous wooded native species groves, multi-use open spaces, and over 3 miles (4.8 km) of soft surface nature trails just within its borders. The trails provide recreational areas, as well as access to wetlands, marshlands, riparian corridor restorations, a compost exposé, a butterfly garden, animal habitats, and a whole host of environs. Fischer's Park also has picnic and cookout facilities. Central to the park is the Arneth Entertainment Center (AEC). Overlooking the historic meadow in Fischer's Park, this venue provides opportunities for concerts, theater, outdoor movies, and art events of all types.
- Bustard Road Park is the Township's primary active athletic facility. It is home to 10 junior league baseball fields, 2 girls’ softball fields, and 3 soccer fields. The facility hosts a variety of youth sport leagues and camps.
- Grist Mill Park is home to a newly completed soccer field which is used by the local youth association as well as the School District. In 2009, two additional, one regulation, the other a practice field, was developed as well as moving mature trees from the Fischers Park Tree Farm to the site improved the overall nature of the Park. Grist Mill Park was the recipient of the 2009 Pennsylvania Horticultural Society Award. This 54-acre (220,000 m^{2}) natural preserve was set aside during the development of the Grist Mill Neighborhood and Jacob's Woods. The site houses the headwaters to the Towamencin Creek, providing neighborhood residents and visitors an unmatched opportunity to examine the waterway's diverse plant and animal habitats.
- Kibler Meadows is the newest addition to the Township's open space, received from the Estate of Virginia W. Kibler in 2005. This area includes approximately 35 acres (140,000 m^{2}) of land located between Kerr and Schlosser Roads in the "Panhandle" section of the Township.

Firehouse Park

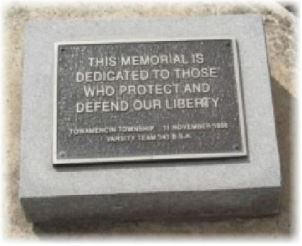
Veterans Memorial

- Firehouse Park is a great place to take a stroll along the tree lined pathway, during a spring or summer day. In November 1996, township resident Tony Di Domizio, as a member of Venture Team 141 in Hatfield Township, erected a plaque and placed a Nineteenth-Century mountain howitzer cannon in the park as his Eagle Scout project to honor veterans who, since 1728, and as early as the, Revolutionary War, have served and given their lives for our freedom. On March 28, 2007, by a unanimous vote, the Board of Supervisor's directed Vice Chairman Dr, Thomas M. Hollenbeck to develop a Veterans Memorial on the grounds of the park.

Towamencin Pool

- Township Pools offer four (4) different choices; a Competition Pool with 2 diving boards, a Baby pool with zero depth entry with mushroom, a Leisure pool with zero depth entry, water slide, spray fountains, tumbling water buckets and mushrooms. In addition to the 4,700-square-foot (440 m^{2}) Bathhouse with Pool Administration Offices, there is a concession stand and covered picnic pavilion. Swim lessons for children ages 5 and older and various pool "member only" events are available throughout the summer.
- The Township is in the process of creating a 33-mile (53 km) comprehensive trail system with access to neighborhoods, parks, historical sites and stores. This trail system is a dynamic project that will continue to expand for years to come, providing a safe alternative to automobiles when traveling throughout the township.

Recreation activities are planned and operated by the Parks and Recreation Department. Youth Sports Leagues are run by TYA.

Towamencin along with Lower Salford Township share the home to Mainland Golf Course located in the North Western section of the township spanning the border of both.

== Twin town ==
Towamencin is twinned with:

- Rawa, Iraq

== Notable people ==
- Gertrude Alderfer, women's baseball player.
- Jay Caufield, NHL right winger.
- Jon Striefsky, Arena Football League player.
